= Aristotle Lane =

Street in North Oxford, UK

Coordinates: 51.7673°N 1.2713°W

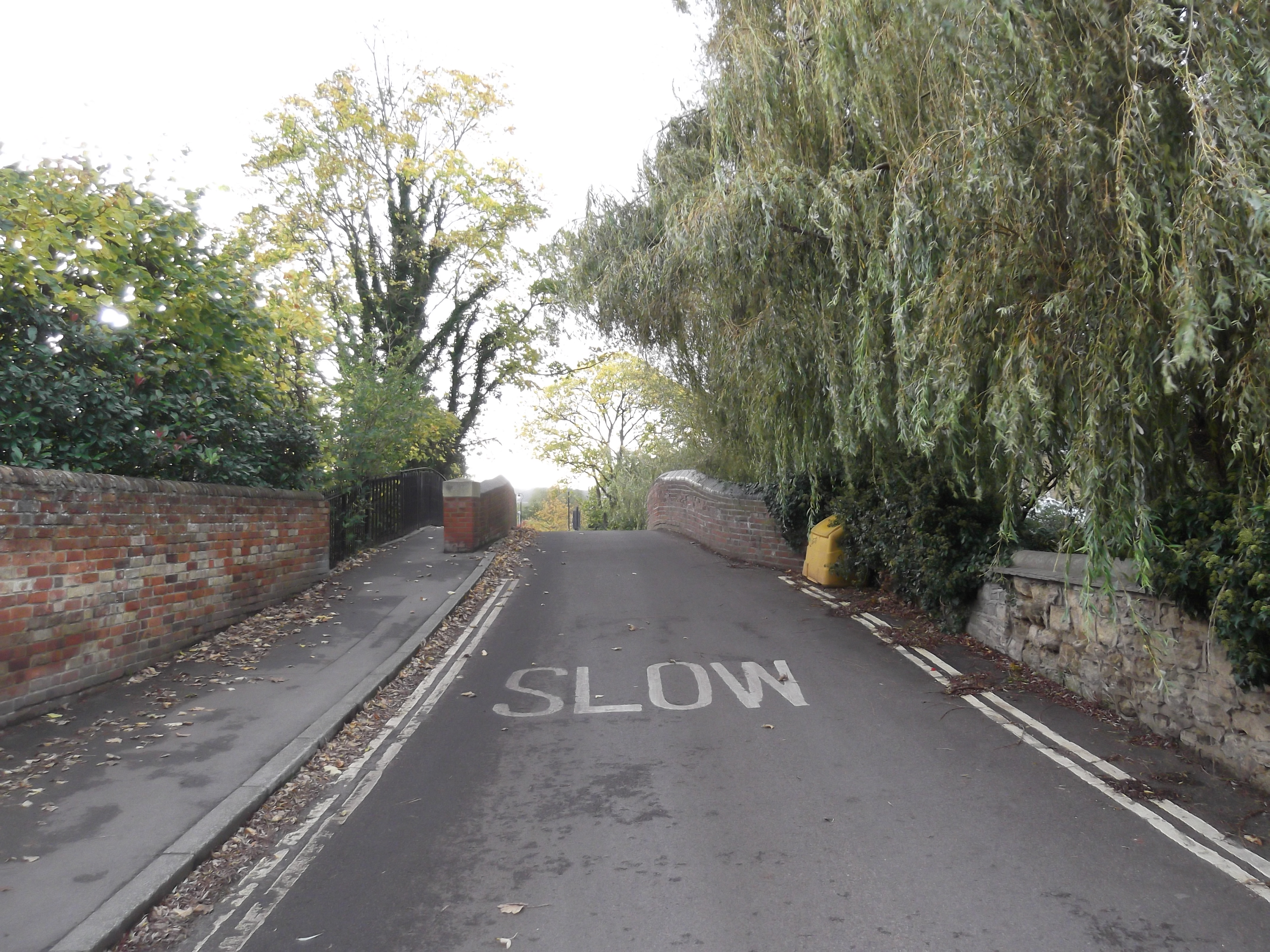
View west over Aristotle Bridge on Aristotle Lane from the junction with Kingston Road and Hayfield Road.

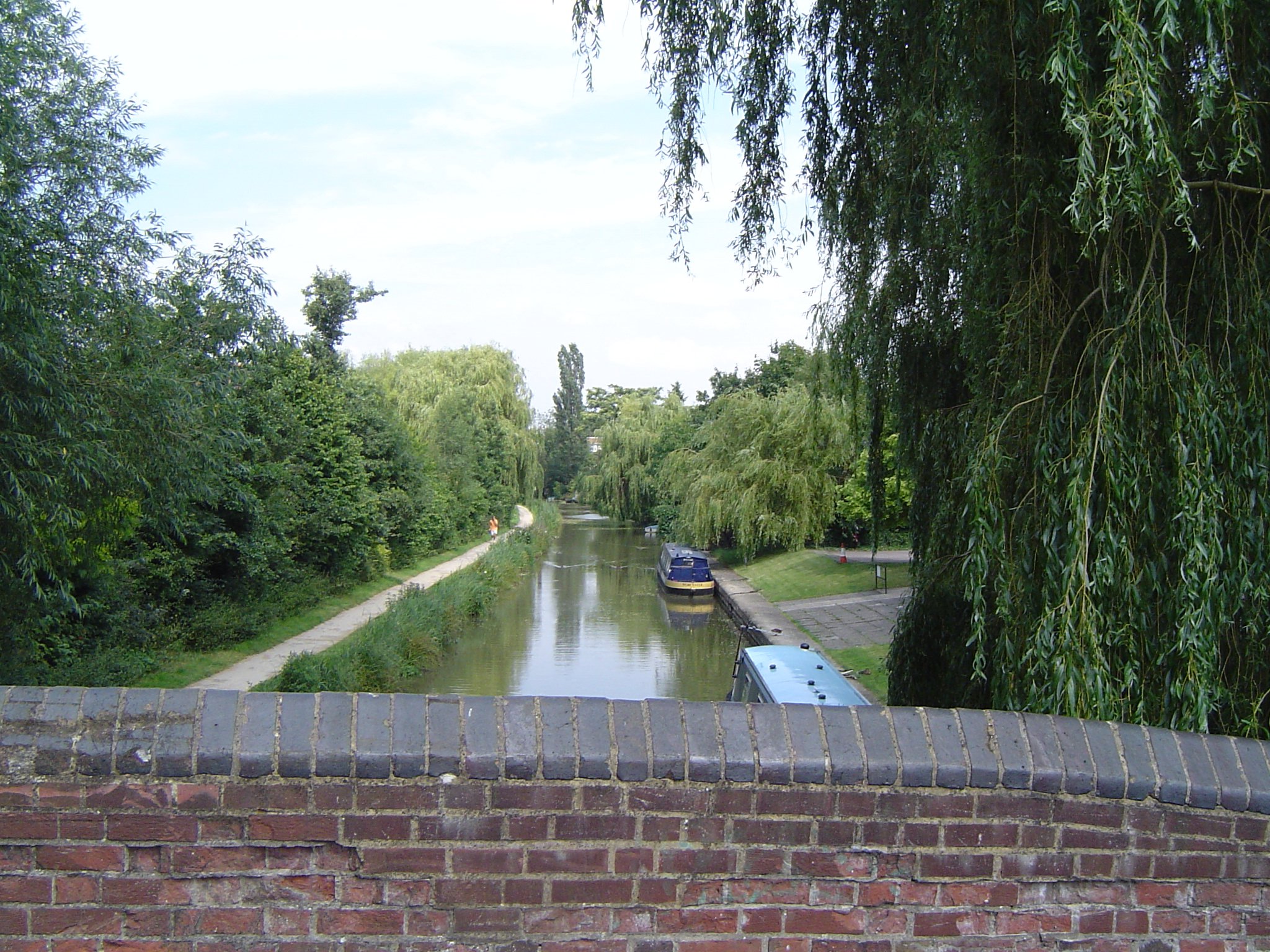
View looking north along the Oxford Canal from Aristotle Bridge on Aristotle Lane.

Aristotle Lane is a road in north Oxford, England.

The lane links North Oxford, leading from the junction of Kingston Road and Hayfield Road (close to the junction with Polstead Road), with Port Meadow to the west, via bridges over the Oxford Canal and railway. The other access to the meadow from North Oxford is via Walton Well Road to the south.

St Philip & St James Primary School is located north of Aristotle Lane, on Navigation Way, having previously been in Leckford Road to the south. The Trap Grounds, Artistol Lane Allotments are also located here, at the western end of Aristotle Lane next to Port Meadow. To the north of the allotments is the Burgess Field Nature Park, formerly a landfill site.

Immediately to the south is the Aristotle Lane Recreation Ground, a grass area of 3.2 acres, including a playground, also adjoining the Oxford Canal.

== History ==
There is evidence of Iron Age tracks from the location of Aristotle Lane across Port Meadow to Binsey Ford. The lane is named after Aristotle's Well in the vicinity, deriving from the name of the Ancient Greek philosopher Aristotle.

On 3 June 1644, King Charles I passed this way with around 5,000 men, strategically withdrawing from Oxford, his temporary capital during the Civil War, across Port Meadow and the Thames.

T. E. Lawrence (1888–1935, aka Lawrence of Arabia) used this route from his home, as a child in Polstead Road, on his way to Port Meadow to dig in the mounds there.

Port Meadow Halt railway station was located just north of Aristotle Lane on the Varsity Line. The London and North Western Railway opened the halt, originally called Summertown after the north Oxford district, on 20 August 1906. It was renamed to Port Meadow Halt in January 1907. The station temporarily closed during World War I, between 1 January 1917 and 5 May 1919. On 30 October 1926, London, Midland and Scottish Railway permanently closed the station.

The land south of Aristotle Lane was acquired from Lucy's by Berkeley Homes and developed during 1996–1999 into the Waterside estate.

== Aristotle Lane Wildlife Corridor ==
Aristotle Lane Wildlife Corridor, which is located within the residential development site of Burgess Mead, is a 0.25-hectare (0.62-acre) strip of land on either side of a minor drainage channel that runs for some 154 metres through the site. Included is a narrow strip of land at the northern site boundary, which buffers the site from the adjacent Trap Grounds. This is an area of reed and sedge beds enclosed by damp woodland dominated by willows. Its interests include breeding water rail, reed warbler, and reed bunting. It has a historical ornithological value due to a history of bird ringing at the site, as well as being the location of a television documentary about the cuckoo.

The pond/wetland created as part of the development has been successful and supports a dense central area of tall emergent vegetation typified by common reed and purple loosestrife, with other species at the margins, including water mint and marsh marigold. The grasslands within the wildlife corridor have their origins partly in wildflower seeding and partly due to turfing (a legacy of the developers' sales team). Seeds of guaranteed native local provenance were used to create species-rich grasslands. Mammal shelves of sand/concrete bags are installed alongside the stream channel beneath the new bridge, which is designed to permit terrestrial wildlife movement along the entire length of the watercourse.

== Gallery ==
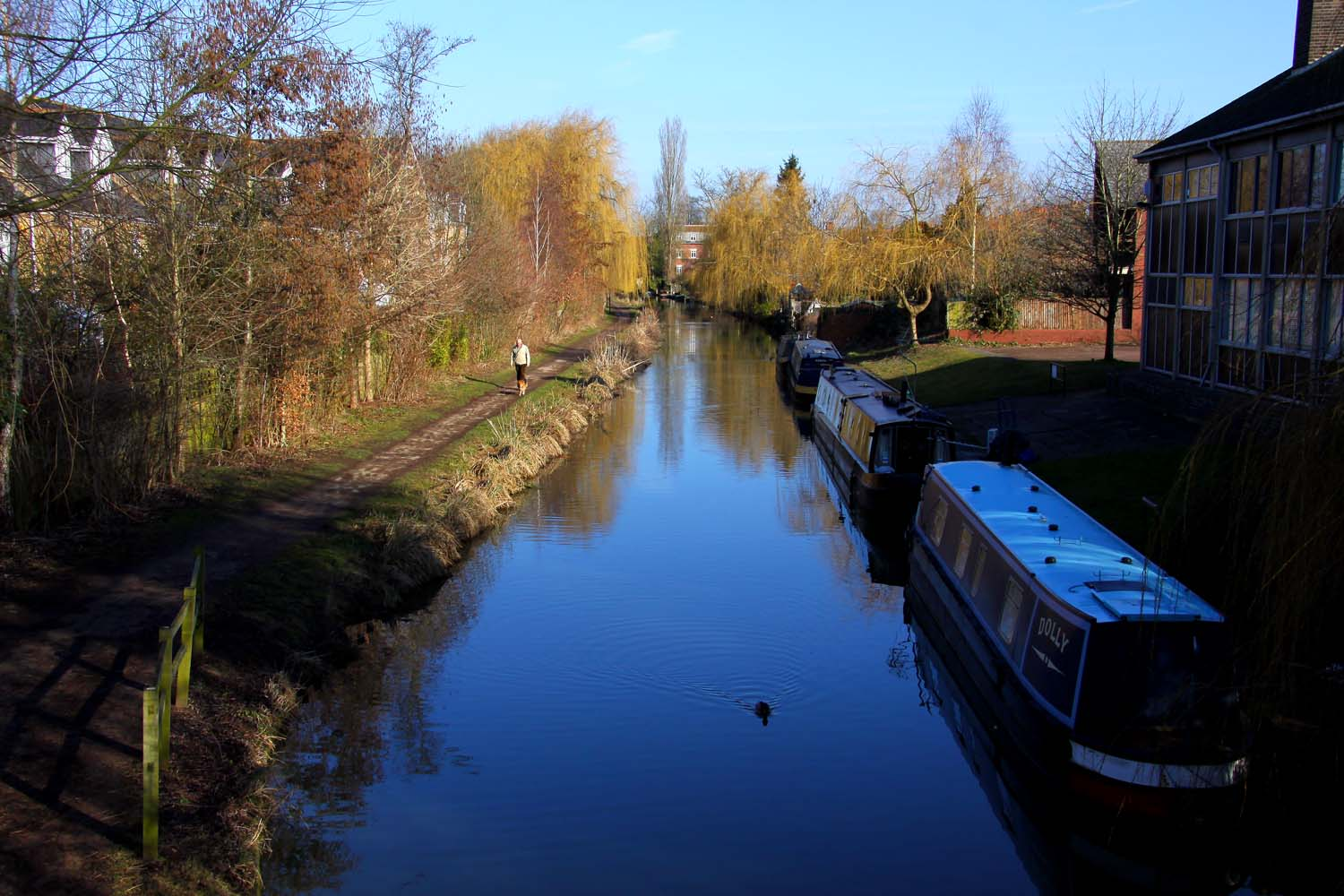
View north along the Oxford Canal from Aristotle Bridge.

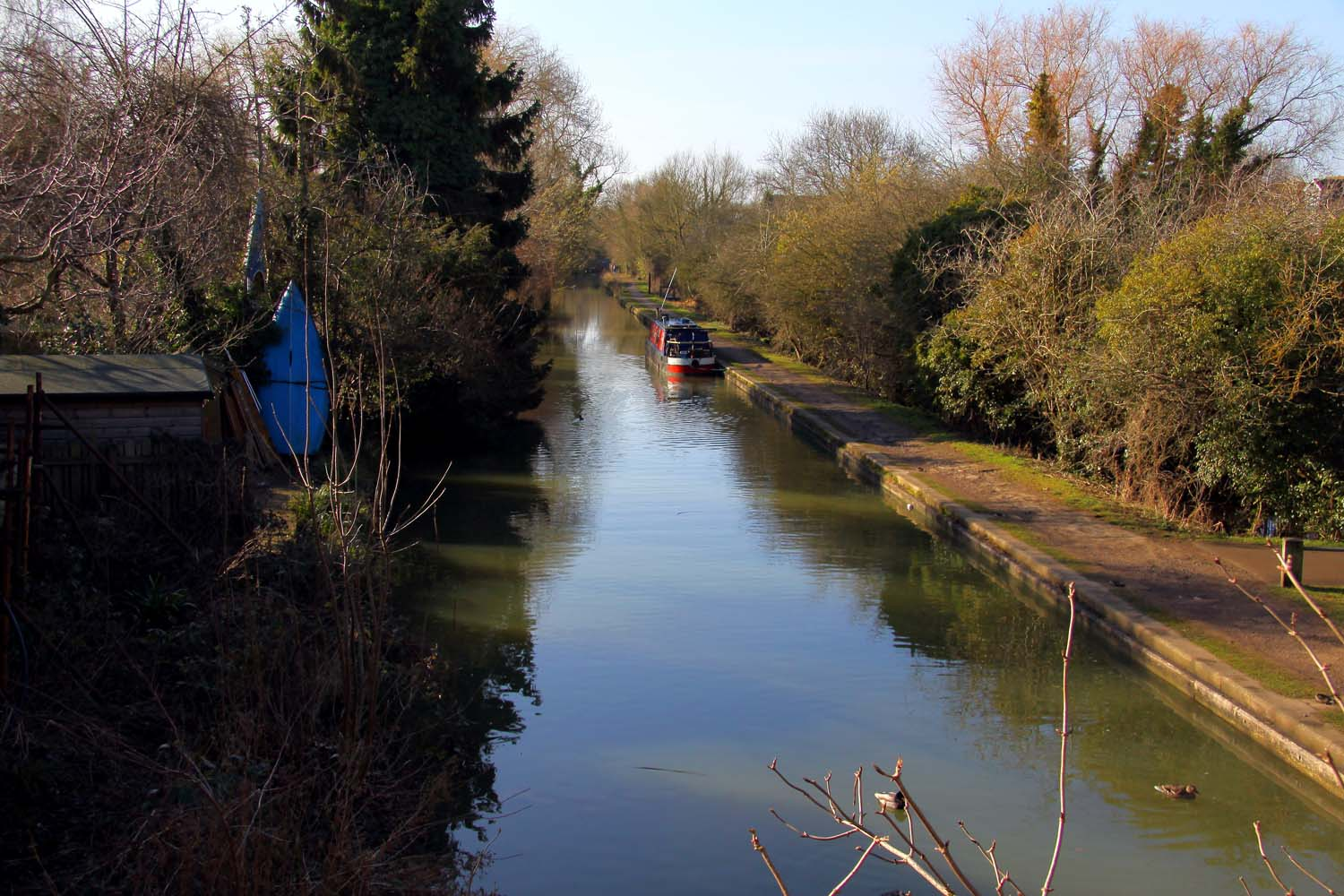
View south along the canal from Aristotle Bridge.

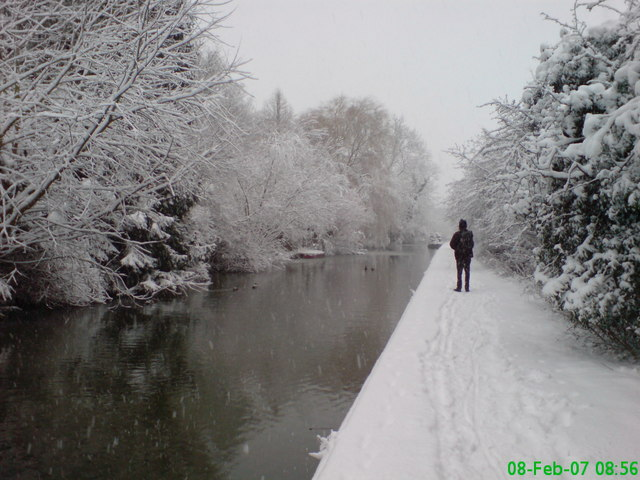
Oxford Canal in the snow south of Aristotle Bridge.

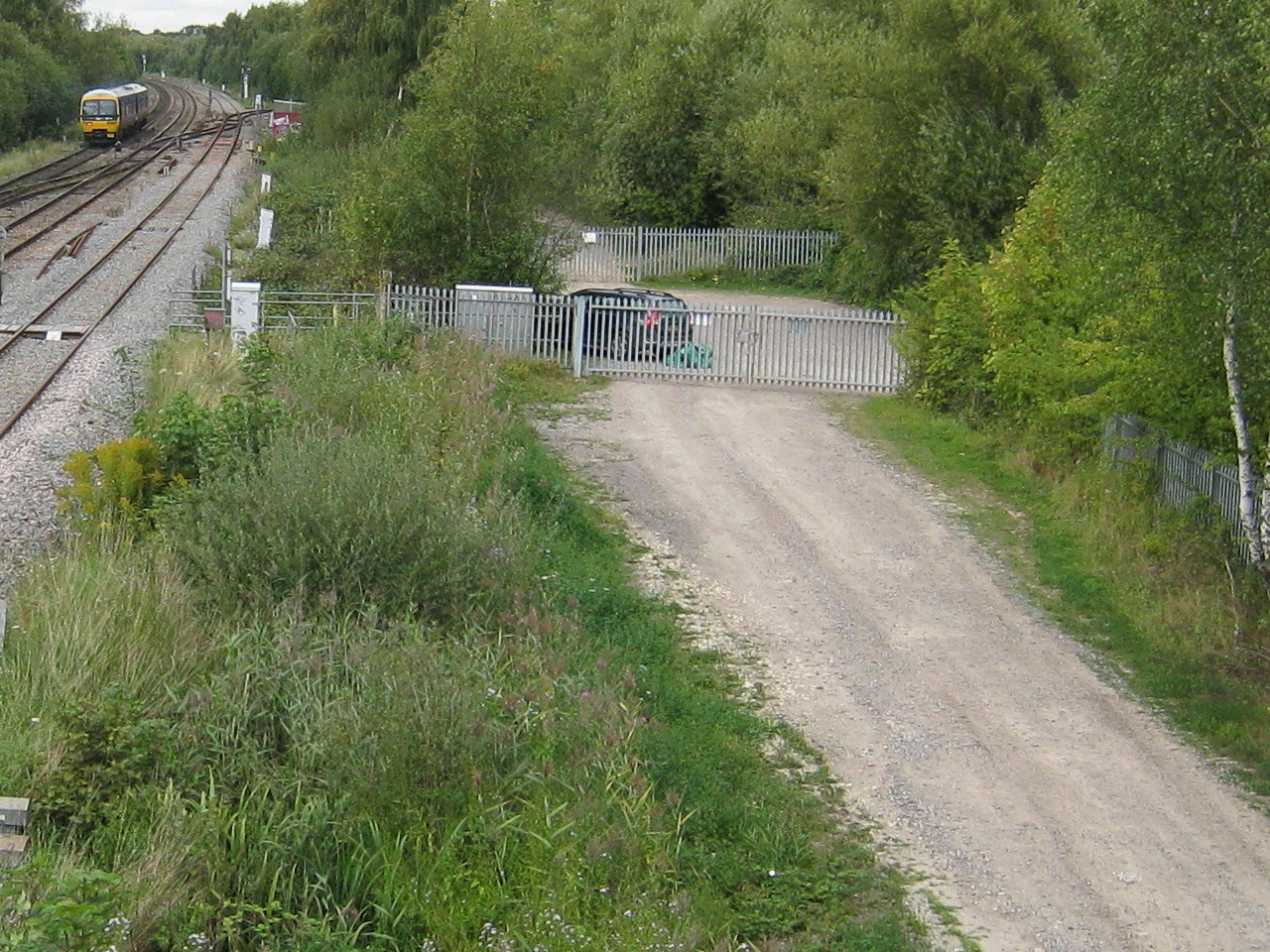
The site of the former Port Meadow Halt railway station, viewed from Aristotle Lane footbridge, looking north towards Wolvercote.
