= Frenchay (disambiguation) =

Frenchay is a place name in England and may refer to:

- Frenchay, Bristol:
  - Frenchay Campus, University of the West of England
  - Frenchay Hospital
- Frenchay Road, Oxford
