= Hayfield Road =

Road in Oxford

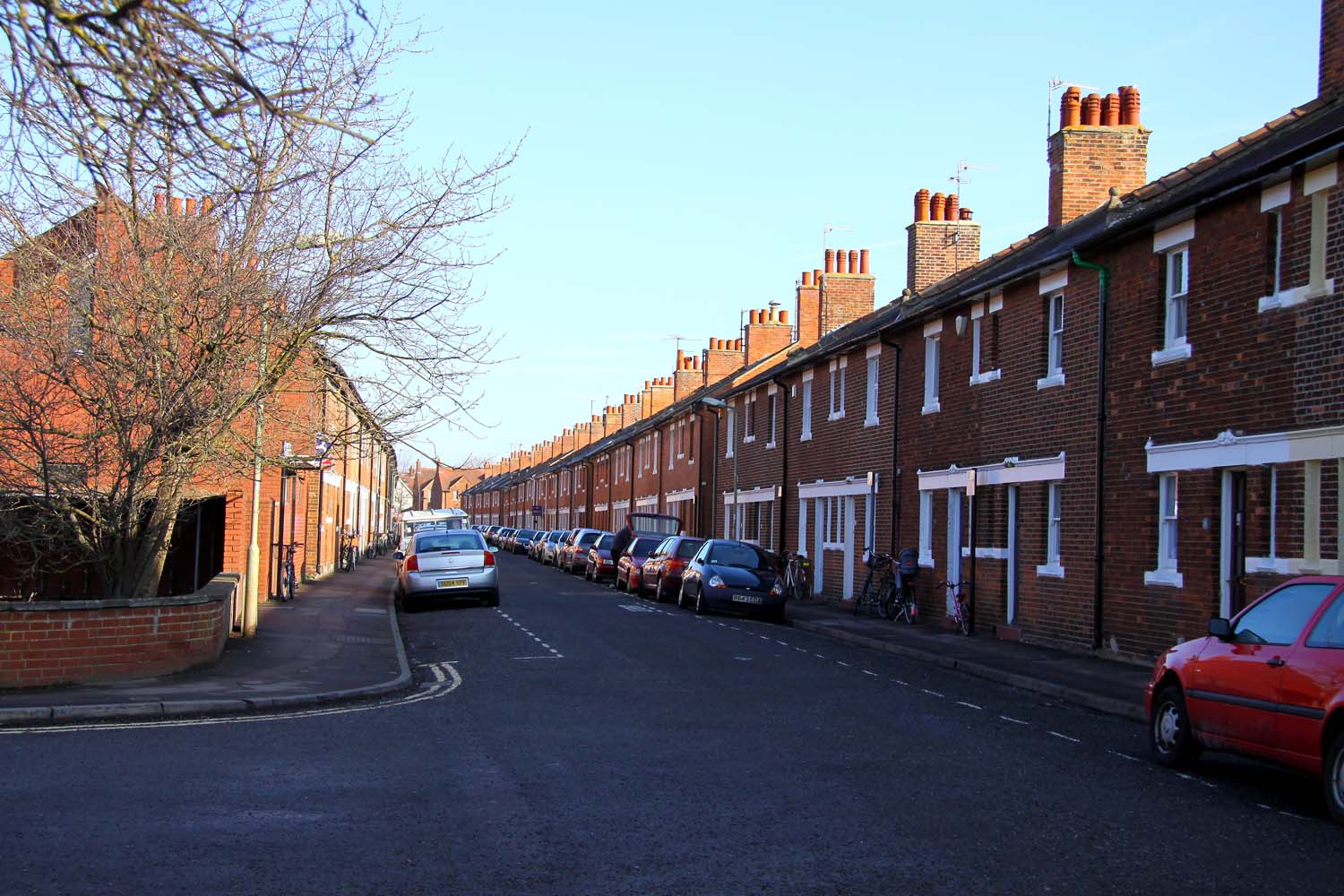
- View along Hayfield Road
- Length: 0.2 mi (0.32 km)
- Postal code: OX2 6
- Coordinates: 51.7690°N 1.2693°W
- south end: Kingston Road; Polstead Road
- north end: Bainton Road; Frenchay Road

Construction
- Construction start: 1886
- Completion: 1888

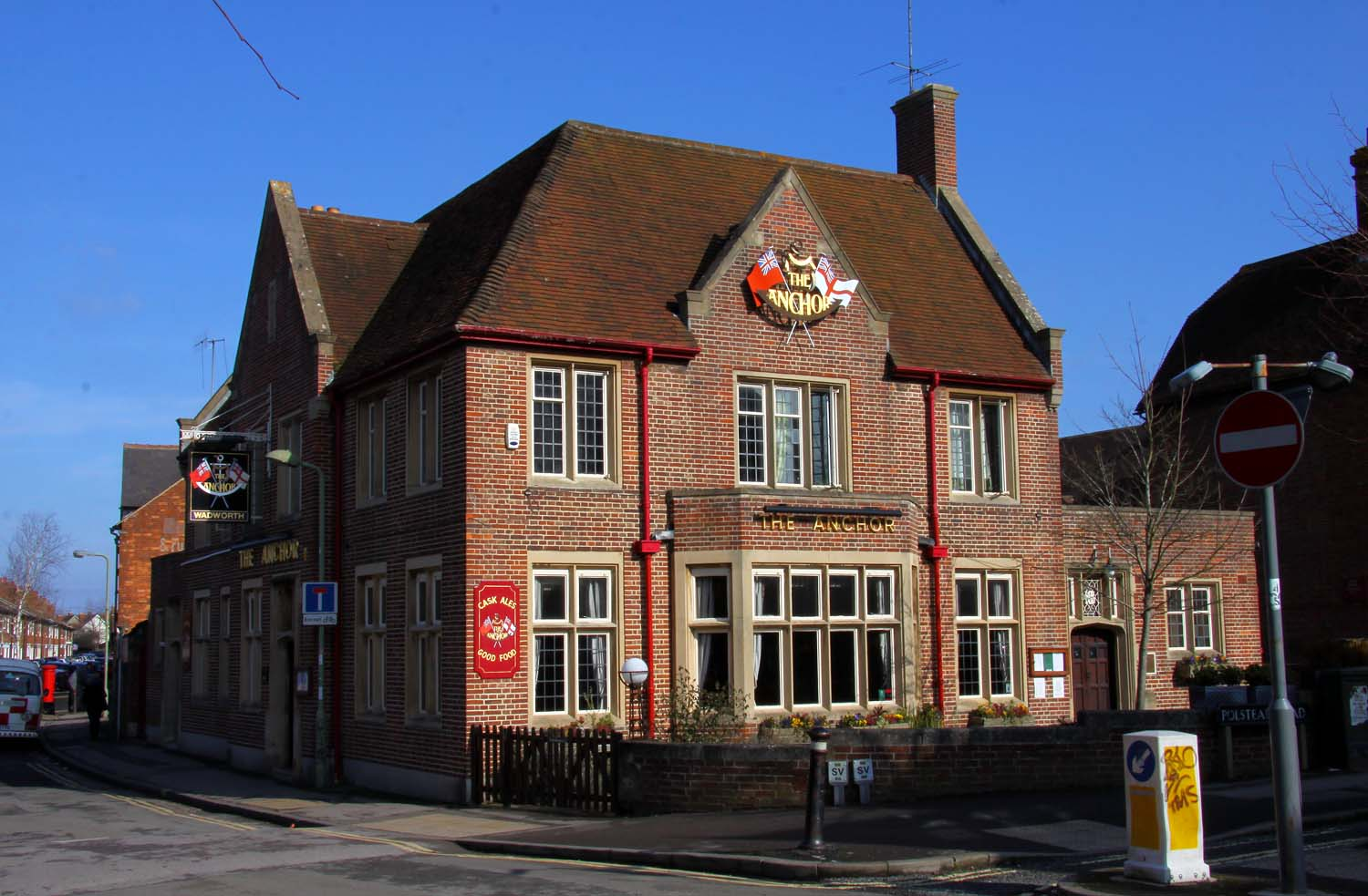
The Anchor public house on the corner of Hayfield Road and Polstead Road.

Hayfield Road is a residential road that runs north-south in Walton Manor, north Oxford, England.

== Location ==
To the south, the road continues as Kingston Road, although it is blocked to through traffic. Aristotle Lane leads off to the west over the Oxford Canal towards Port Meadow. Also to the west on the other side of the canal is the Trap Grounds nature reserve. Polstead Road leads to the east connecting with Chalfont Road and then Woodstock Road, which both run parallel with Hayfield Road. To the north the road continues as Bainton Road, and Frenchay Road crosses the road east-west.

== History ==
Heyfield's Hutt, kept by a Mr Heyfield who died in 1778, was located on a site at the southern end of Hayfield Road. This became known as Dolley’s Hut, after the landlord William Dolley. The Oxford Canal reached the outskirts of Oxford in 1789, when a coal wharf was opened at Heyfield Hutt. The Anchor inn was established in 1796 on the site of Heyfield's Hutt to serve the canal boat trade at what was then the end of the Oxford Canal.

Hayfield Road was developed as part of the North Oxford estate of St John's College. It was established during 1886–88. The terraced houses were deliberately designed to be smaller than other houses to the east on the estate. The houses in Hayfield Road were designed by Harry Wilkinson Moore and were all leased in 1887.

St Margaret's Institute Community Centre was the first building constructed on Polstead Road, close to Hayfield Road, following a subscription by parishioners of St Philip and St James Church in 1889 "for the building of a Working Men's Institute, 'to provide rational amusement and instruction for working men of any creed, sect, or opinions, who may thus be kept out of public houses'".

A celebratory centenary street party was held in 1985.

The Anchor public house featured in the Inspector Morse episode "Death is Now My Neighbour". It is at the corner of Hayfield Road and Polstead Road, opposite the junction with Aristotle Lane. Just to the north is the Aladdin Garage.

== Bibliography ==
- Robinson, Catherine; Wade, Liz (2010). A Corner of North Oxford: The Community at the Crossroads. Oxford: Graffiti Press. ISBN 978-0-9566333-1-6.
- Symonds, Ann Spokes (1998). The Changing Faces of North Oxford. Vol. Book Two. Witney: Robert Boyd Publications. ISBN 1-899536-33-7.
