= Waterways, Oxford =

Housing estate in Oxford, England

Coordinates: 51.772°N 1.273°W

Waterways
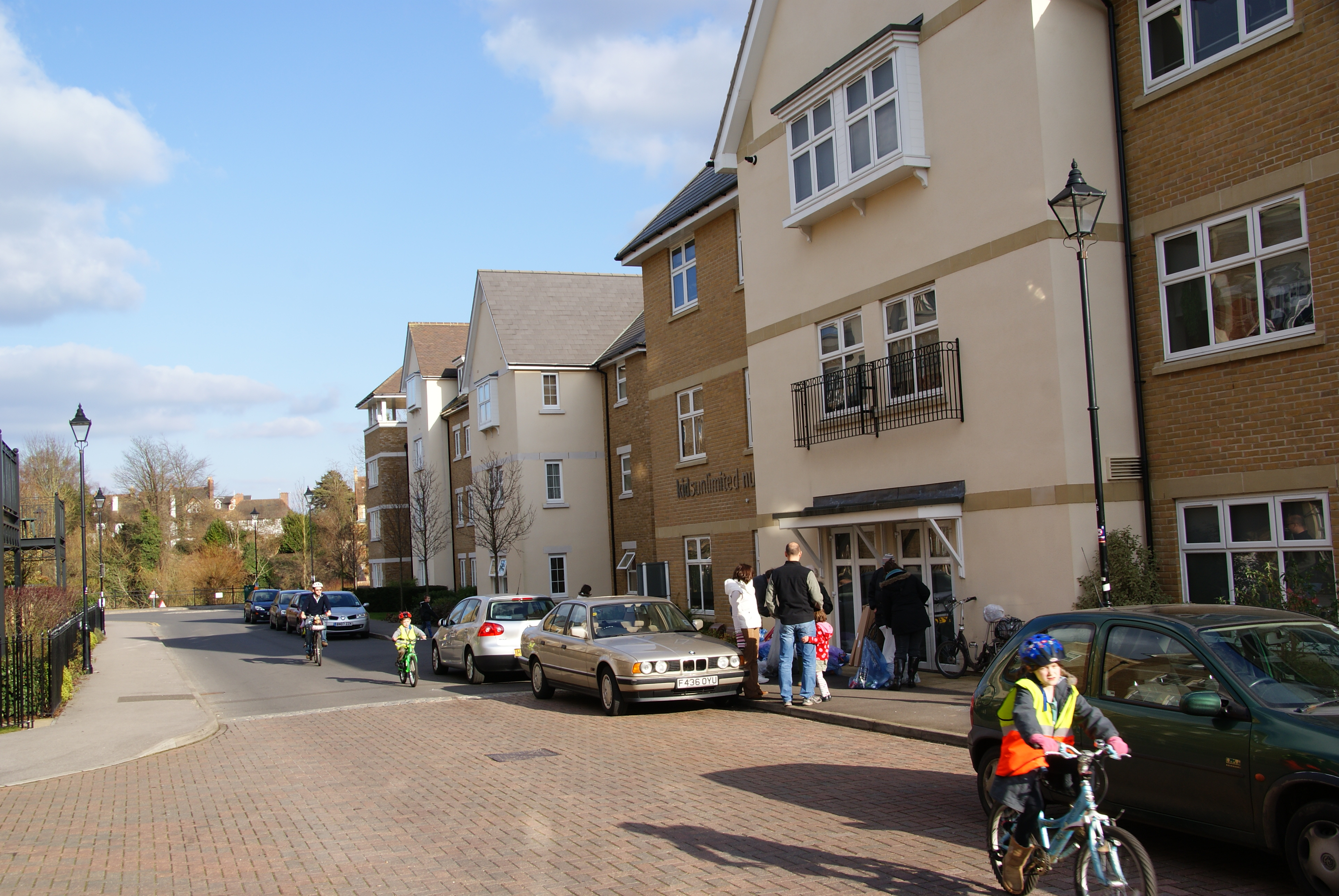
- Community litter-picking at Waterways.

- Location within Oxfordshire
- OS grid reference: SP502084
- Civil parish: unparished
- District: Oxford
- Shire county: Oxfordshire
- Region: South East
- Country: England
- Sovereign state: United Kingdom
- Post town: Oxford
- Postcode district: OX2
- Dialling code: 01865
- Police: Thames Valley
- Fire: Oxfordshire
- Ambulance: South Central
- UK Parliament: Oxford West and Abingdon
- Website: Waterways World

The Waterways is housing estate in North Oxford, England. The Oxford Canal runs through the centre of the estate and it is bounded on the east by the Cherwell Valley railway line. To the west beyond the railway line are Port Meadow and the River Thames. The estate begins in the south as a continuation of Frenchay Road, part of Victorian North Oxford, and as Elizabeth Jennings Way connects with the Woodstock Road (A4144) at the northern end of the estate.

South of the estate, a Town Green area called the Trap Grounds is a wetland and woodland nature reserve. The wetland is fed by the watercourse that runs through the estate from the 'lake' that was originally one of the North Oxford clay pits.

The estate was built between 2000 and 2006, on the site of the British Motor Corporation's former Osberton Radiator Factory. There is a Waterways Residents Association (WRA) which represents everyone living on the estate, The Waterways Management Company (WMC) manages most of the public areas and leasehold properties on the Estate and represents the interests of the property owners.

The two main roads on the development cross the canal via modern, red brick bridges on Frenchay Road and Elizabeth Jennings Way. These bridges were painted with a series of murals in 2016 showing local history and wildlife and featuring drawings by local children. The project was organised by local residents supported by The Canal and Riverside Trust (C&RT), Oxford City and County Councils, Thames Valley Police and the local boater community, with funding from Tesco 'Bags of Help'.
