= Hook Meadow and The Trap Grounds =

Site of Special Scientific Interest, Oxford, England

Coordinates: 51.777°N 1.278°W

- Site of Special Scientific Interest
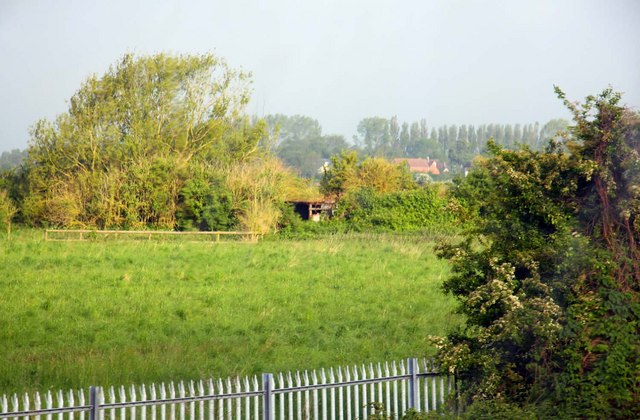
- Location of Hook Meadow and The Trap Grounds.
- Area of search: Oxfordshire
- Grid reference: SP 499 089
- Interest: Biological
- Area: 11.9 hectares (29 acres)
- Notification date: 1986
- Location map: Magic Map

Hook Meadow and The Trap Grounds is a 11.9-hectare (29-acre) biological Site of Special Scientific Interest on the northern outskirts of Oxford in Oxfordshire.

These unimproved meadows in the floodplain of the River Thames are poorly drained and they have calcareous clay soils. The southern field is the most waterlogged, and its flora includes wetland species such as sharp-flowered rush, marsh arrow grass, common spike-rush and early marsh orchid.

The site is private land with no public access.

== See also ==
- Burgess Field Nature Park
- Trap Grounds
