= Bainton Road =

Road in North Oxford, England

Coordinates: 51.7727°N 1.2691°W

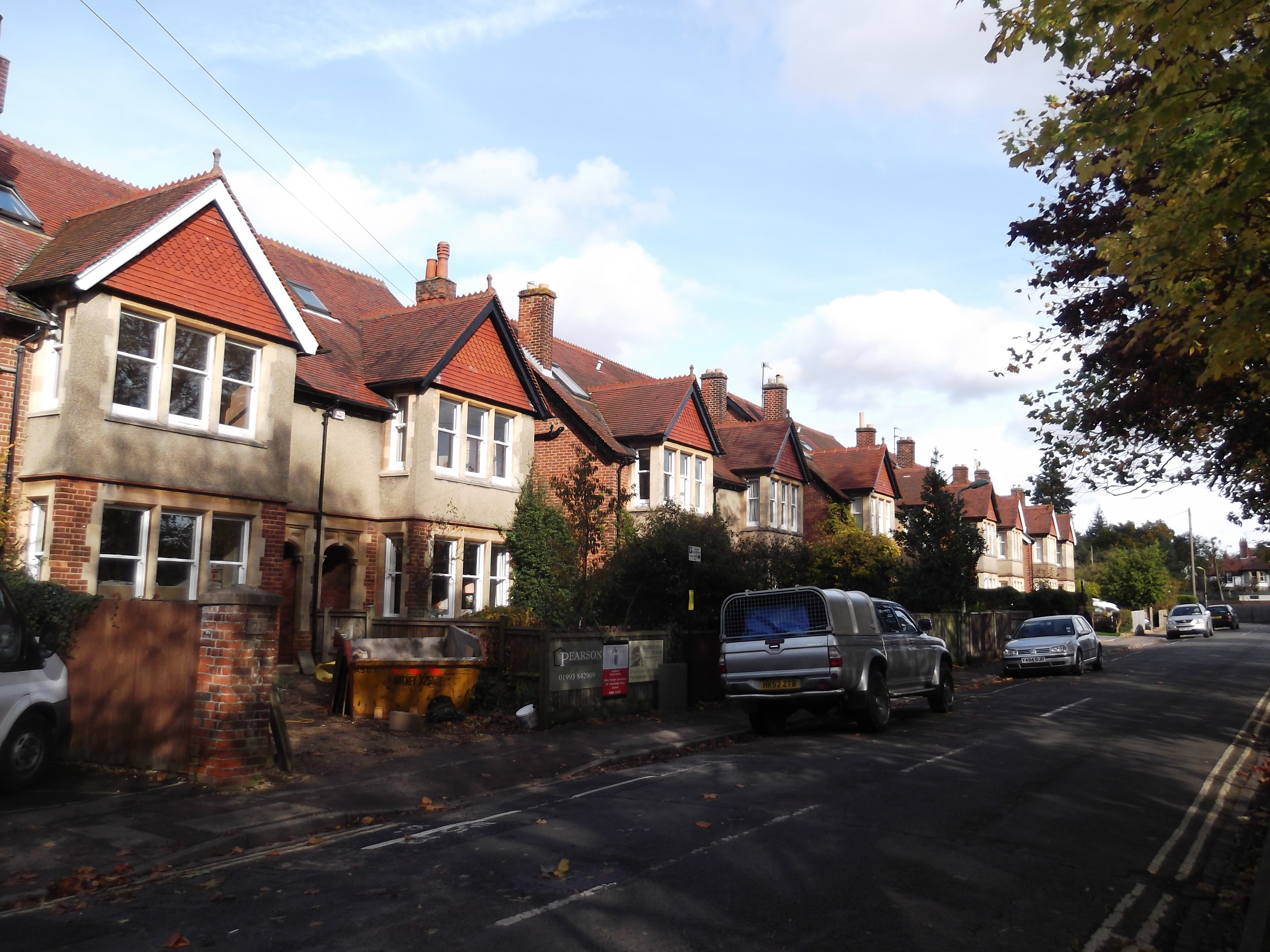
View east along the north part of Bainton Road

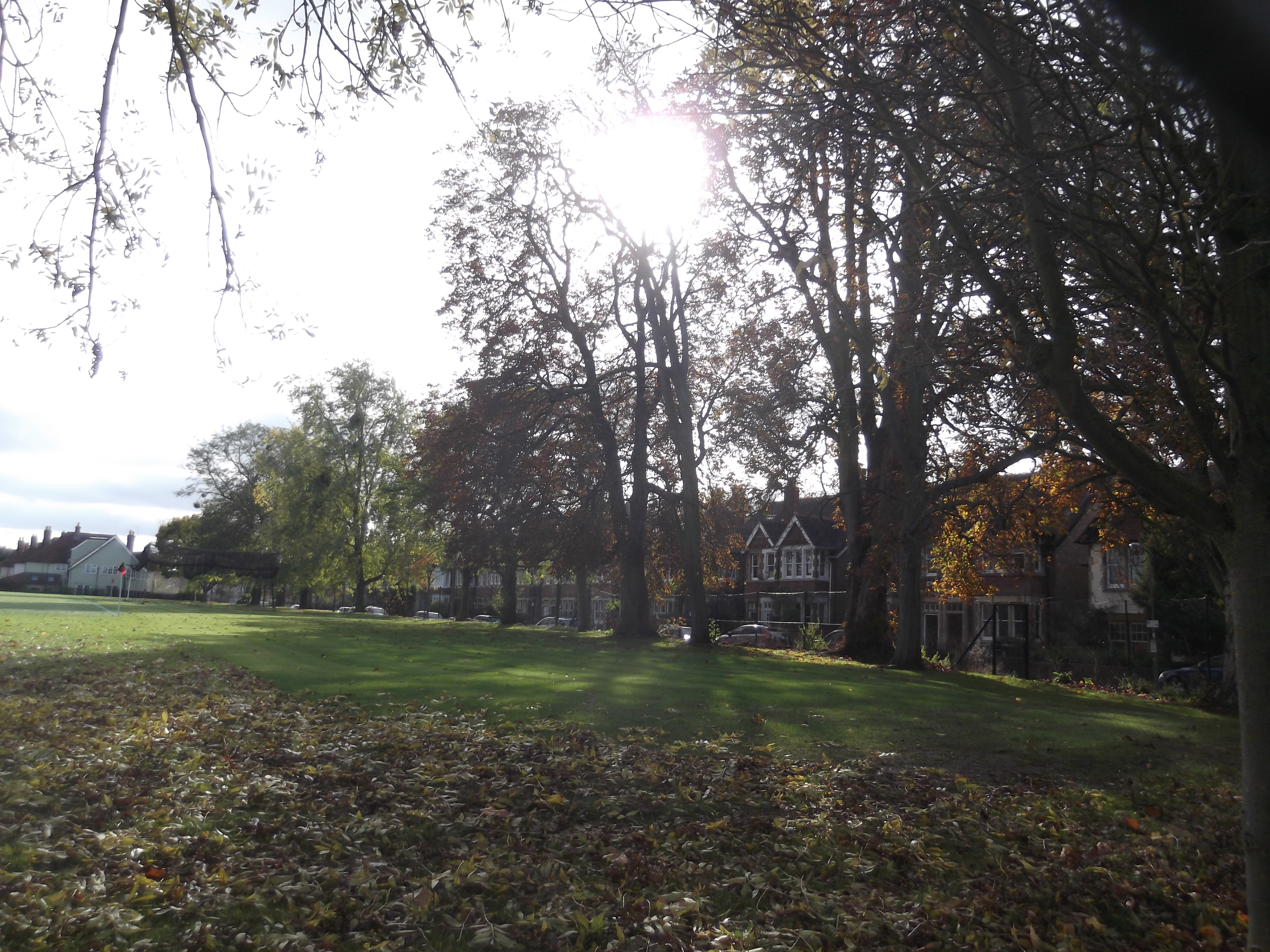
View across the northwest corner of St John's College playing field to the south part of Bainton Road

Bainton Road is a residential road in north Oxford, England.

== Route ==
The road runs south–north and then west–east, skirting around the west and north sides of the St John's College playing field. At the eastern end is a junction with Woodstock Road (A4144), a major arterial road out of Oxford to the north. At the southern end is a junction with Frenchay Road. The road continues south as Hayfield Road. To the west is the Oxford Canal.

== History ==
N. W. Harrison, surveyor to the North Oxford building estate, laid out the road around the west and north side of the cricket ground of St John's College. The houses in Bainton Road were first leased between 1906 and 1931.

Morris Motors made car radiators in a factory on Bainton Road.

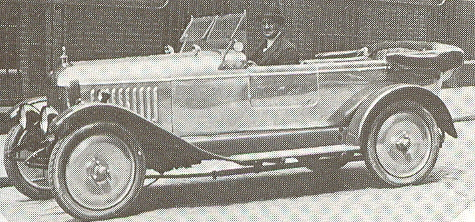
The MG 14/28 car, manufactured in Bainton Road from 1925 to 1927

In September 1925, the MG Cars factory moved from the cramped facilities at Alfred Lane (Pusey Lane off Pusey Street since around 1927) in central Oxford to join the Radiator Branch at Bainton Road, within a partitioned area of the premises. The MG 14/28 car was manufactured at both sites between 1924 and 1927.

The Holiday Caravan Company was also based in Bainton Road.

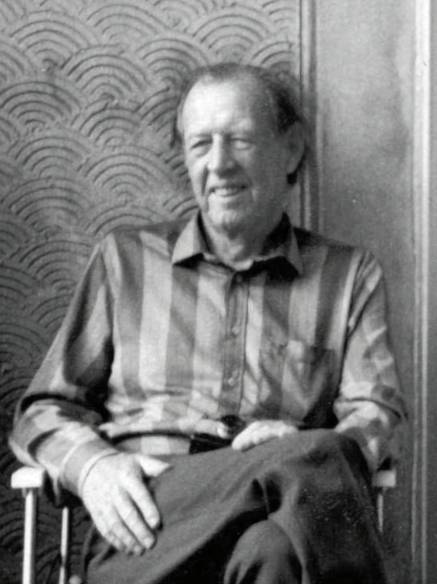
The academic and writer Raymond Williams, who lived at 47 Bainton Road

== Notable residents ==
The New Zealand writer, journalist, and editor John Mulgan (1911–1945) lived at 5 Bainton Road. The Welsh academic, novelist and critic Raymond Williams (1921–1988) bought 47 Bainton Road from a colleague in 1960. The physicist, philosopher and author Danah Zohar has lived at 57 Bainton Road.

== See also ==
- Bainton, Oxfordshire
