= Trap Grounds =

Nature reserve in Oxford, England

Coordinates: 51.7689939°N 1.2712437°W

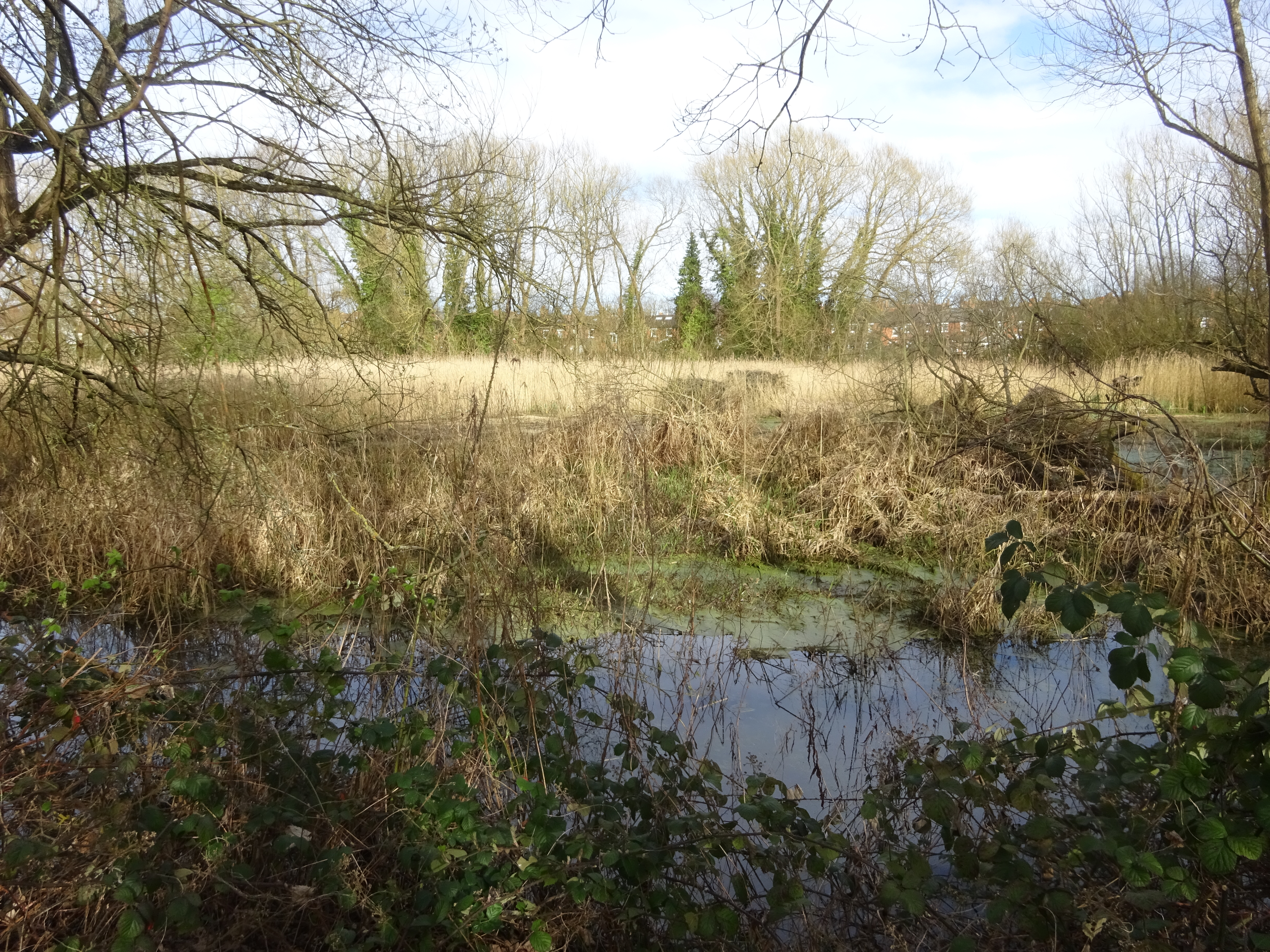
- View of the Trap Grounds

- Location within Oxfordshire
- OS grid reference: SP 503 081
- Civil parish: unparished
- District: Oxford
- Shire county: Oxfordshire
- Region: South East
- Country: England
- Sovereign state: United Kingdom
- Post town: Oxford
- Postcode district: OX2 6XW
- Dialling code: 01865
- Police: Thames Valley
- Fire: Oxfordshire
- Ambulance: South Central
- UK Parliament: Oxford West and Abingdon
- Website: trap-grounds.org.uk

The Trap Grounds (aka Trap Grounds Town Green) is a nature reserve in north Oxford, Oxfordshire, England, owned by Oxford City Council.

== Overview ==
The site is to the east of the railway line and the Burgess Field Nature Park, to the west of the Oxford Canal and Hayfield Road in North Oxford, south of Frenchay Road and the Waterways housing estate, and north of SS Philip and James' Church of England Primary School and Aristotle Lane. Further to the west are Port Meadow and the River Thames. Further to the north is a Site of Special Scientific Interest (SSSI), Hook Meadow, and the Trap Grounds. Also close by are the separately organized trap ground allotments. The original trap grounds were much more extensive, including Burgess Field, but the present site is now largely surrounded by built-up suburbs of Oxford.

The area is on a reclaimed trash dump site and is approximately 3.8 hectares (9.4 acres) in size. The site consists of woodland, reed beds, ponds, some grassy areas, and paths, including a boardwalk. There is a single point of entry to the site immediately to the south of Frenchay Road Bridge on the canal. Wildlife on the site includes slow worms.

== History ==
In 2002, there was a public inquiry about converting the Trap Grounds, which was owned by the city council of Oxford at the time, to a town green. This inquiry would have made the trap grounds open and accessible for public use. In 2003, a court considered another bid for the Trap Grounds to become a town green, this time as a preamble for a bid to develop the land into housing units. Later in 2005–06, a case involving Oxfordshire County Council and Oxford City Council to decide the future of the Trap Grounds was decided in the House of Lords. In 2007, Catherine Robinson of The Friends of the Trap Grounds was awarded the Campaign to Protect Rural England's top honor for protecting the Trap Grounds from development. In 2010, a new walkway was created on the site. In 2012, there was a discussion on how much access there should be to the site.

== The Friends of the Trap Grounds ==
The Friends of the Trap Grounds is a volunteer organization that helps to maintain the Trap Grounds.

== Panoramic view ==
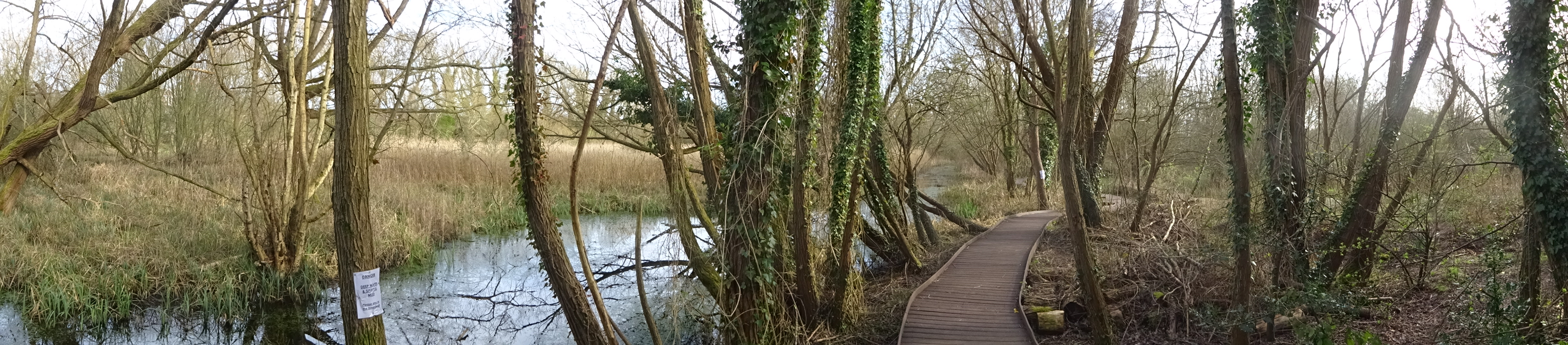
Panoramic view of the Trap Grounds, including the boardwalk

== Image gallery ==
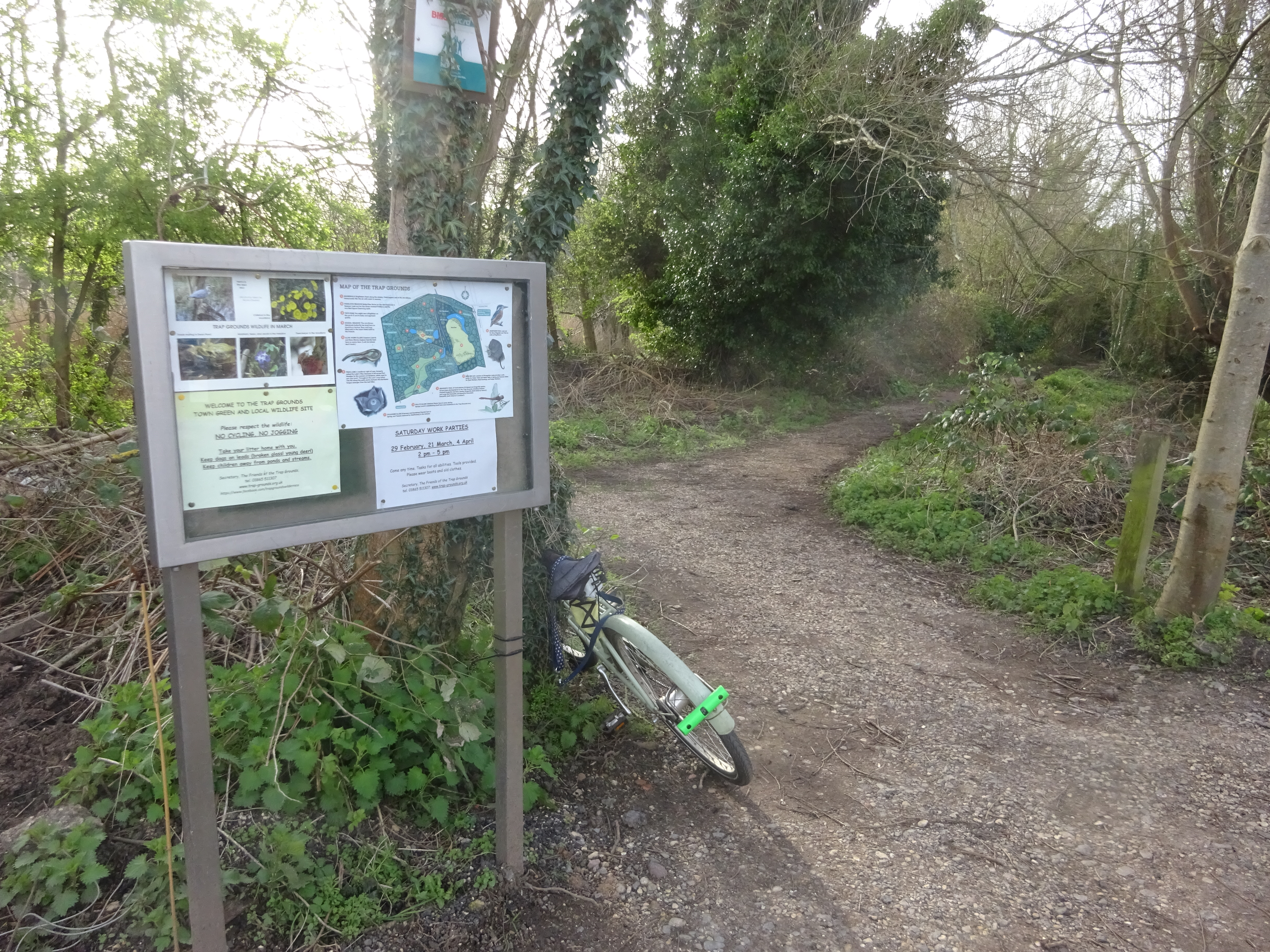
The entrance of the Trap Grounds.

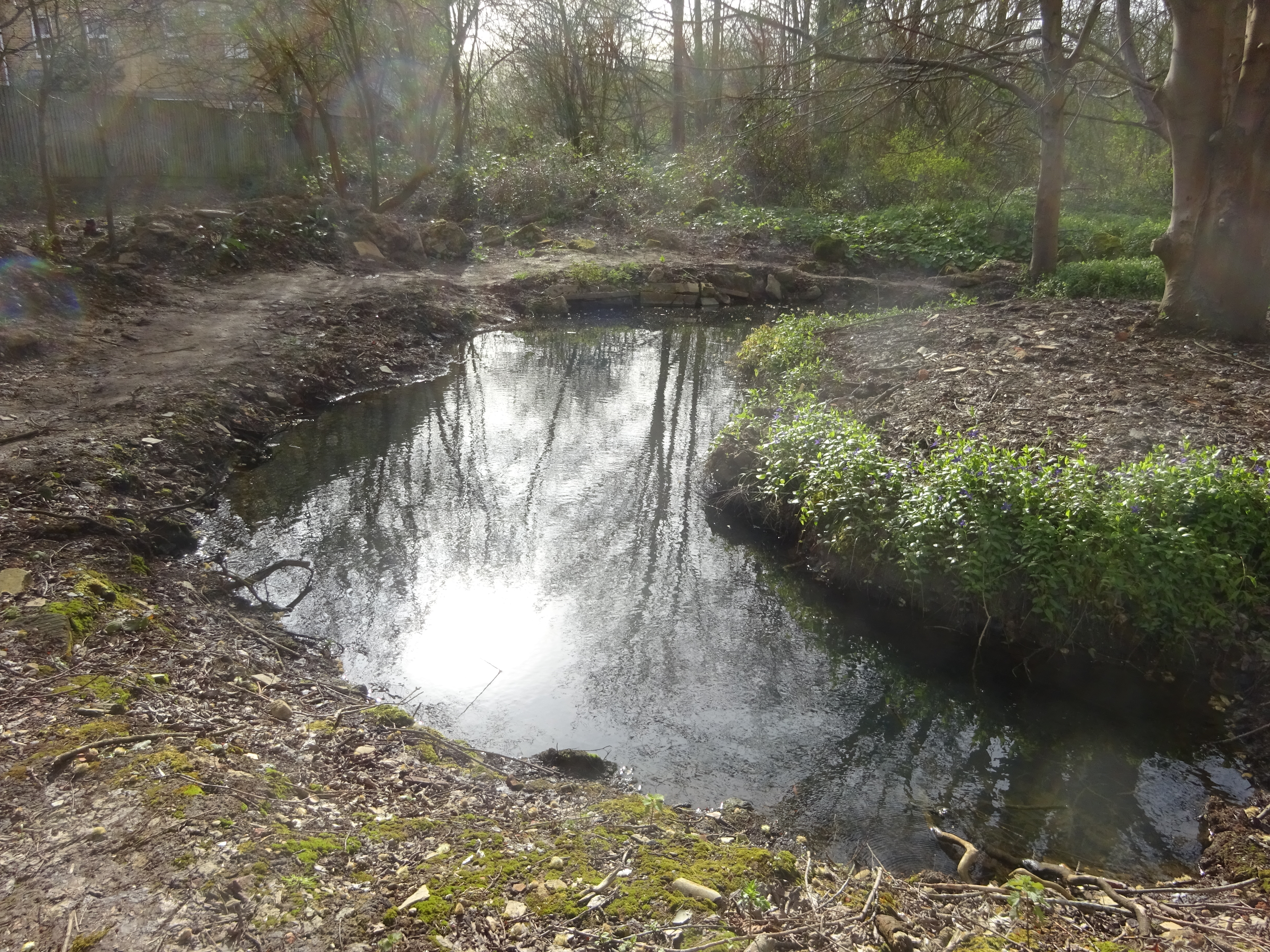
A pond at the Trap Grounds.

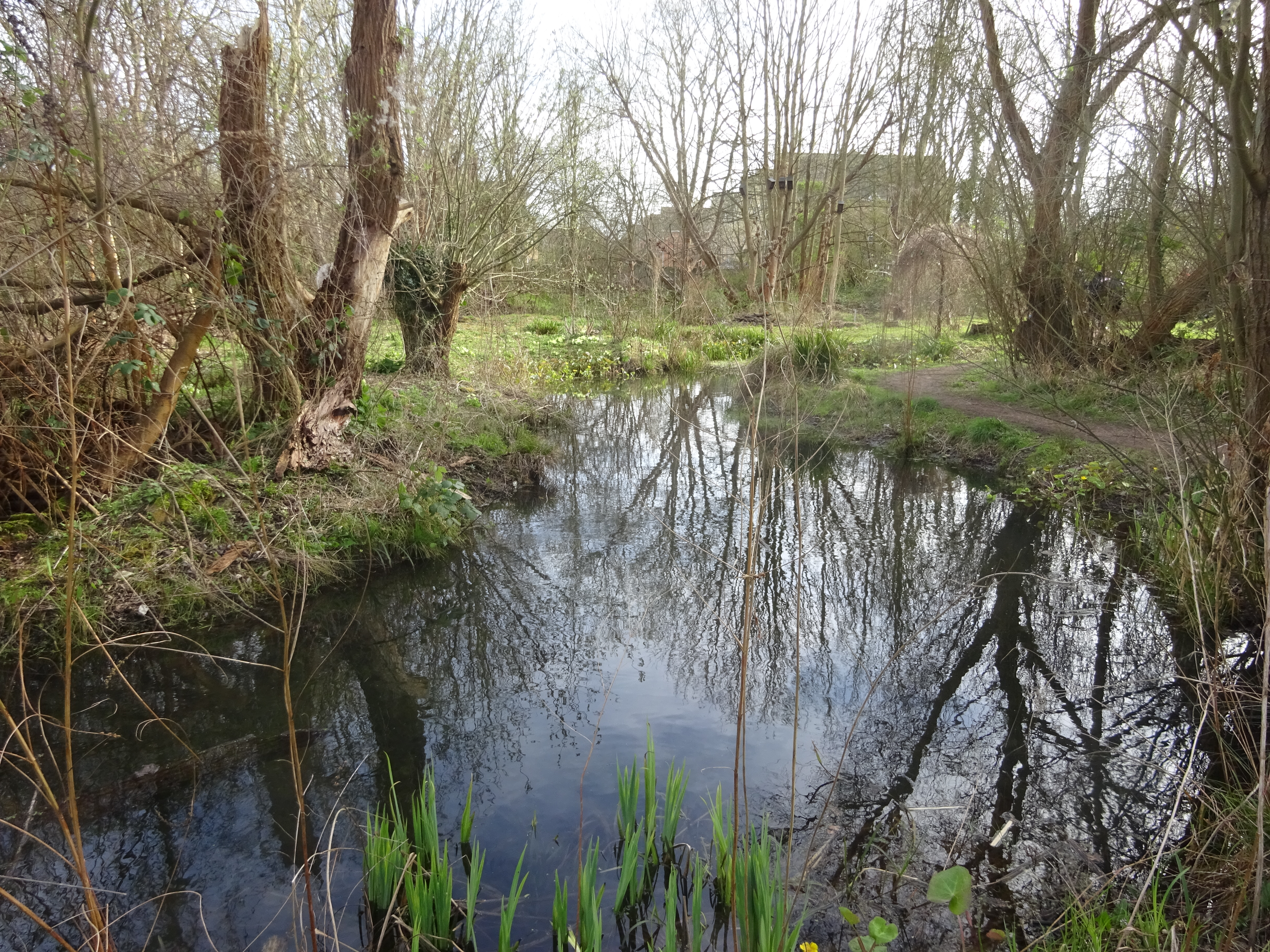
Waterway through the Trap Grounds.

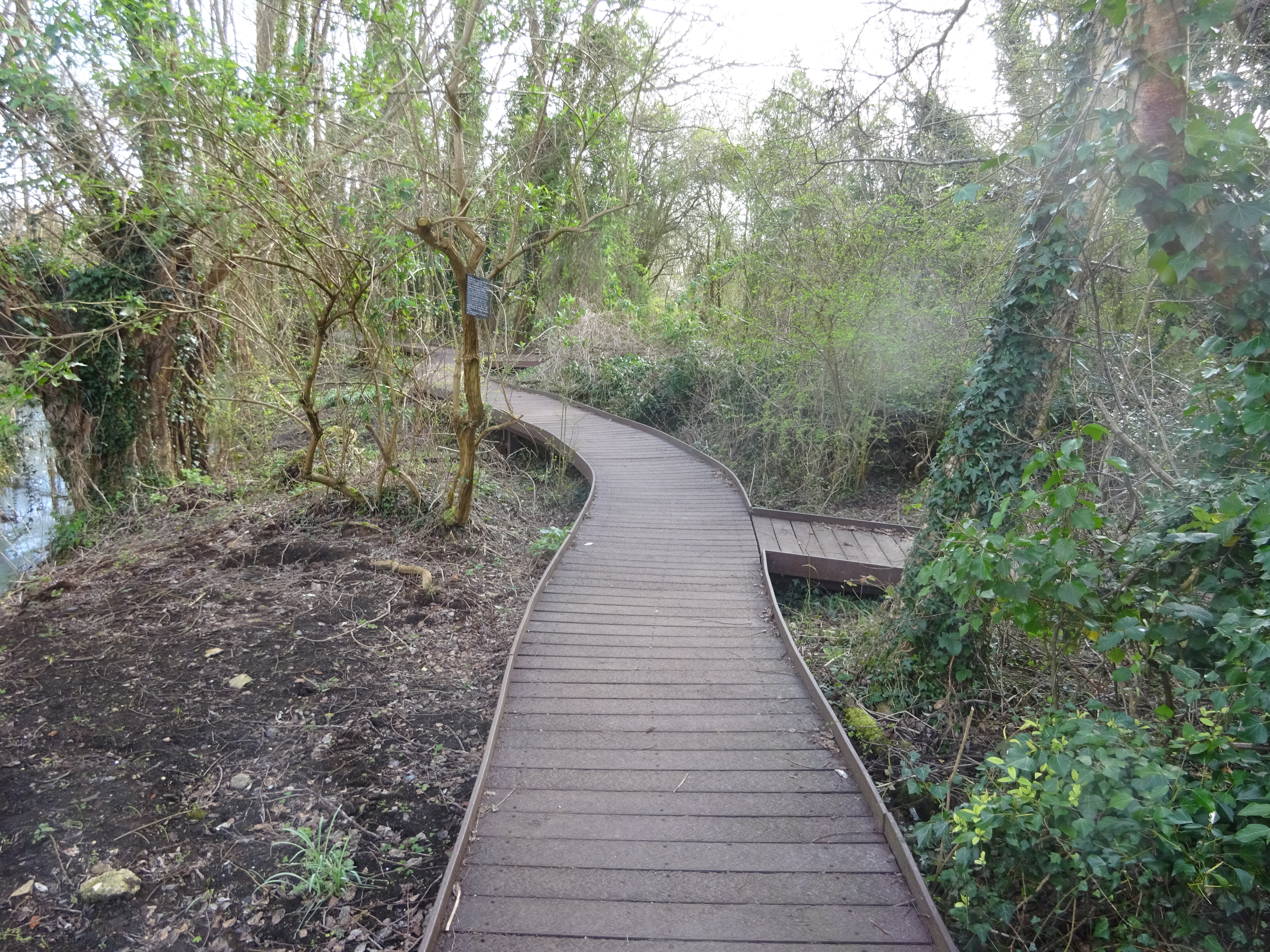
The boardwalk in the Trap Grounds.

== See also ==
- Burgess Field Nature Park
- Hook Meadow and The Trap Grounds
- Oxford Canal
- Port Meadow
