= Wolvercote Common =

Coordinates: 51.784°N 1.286°W

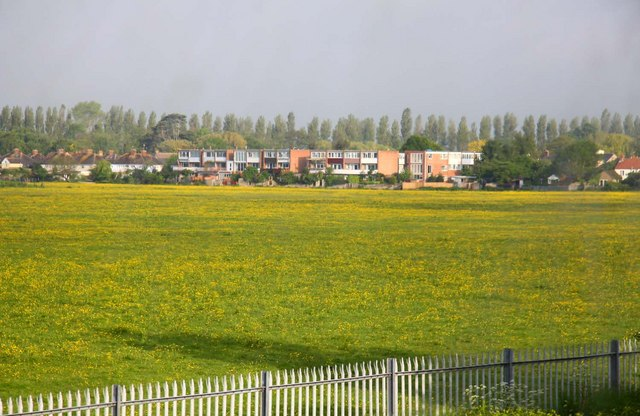
- Looking across Wolvercote Common towards the village

- Location within Oxfordshire
- Civil parish: Wolvercote
- District: Oxford
- Shire county: Oxfordshire
- Region: South East
- Country: England
- Sovereign state: United Kingdom
- Post town: Oxford
- Postcode district: OX2
- Dialling code: 01865
- Police: Thames Valley
- Fire: Oxfordshire
- Ambulance: South Central
- UK Parliament: Oxford West and Abingdon
- Website: Wolvercote Commoners' Committee

Wolvercote Common is an area of grassed common land north of Port Meadow in Oxford, England.

== Overview ==
Wolvercote is a village in the City of Oxford on the northern edge of Wolvercote Common. Wolvercote villagers have traditionally had rights on the common: horses and cattle are still grazed on Wolvercote Common and Port Meadow. The Common is part of the flood plain of the river Thames.

The common is separated from Wolvercote Green by the Cotswold Line railway (which forms the Common's eastern boundary) and the Oxford Canal. The Common's western boundary is the river Thames (or Isis). The Common is roughly 50 hectares in extent, although the boundary with Port Meadow to the south is imprecisely defined by the Shiplake Ditch.

== History ==
Grazing on the common was recorded in the Domesday Book of 1086. Villagers in Wolvercote have had the right to pasture cows, geese, and horses on Wolvercote Common for many centuries. The rights were first confirmed in 1279. There have been many disputes concerning commoners' rights in the past. For example, in 1552, George Owen, owner of Wolvercote Manor and the mill, and physician to King Henry VIII, petitioned the King to prevent the Mayor of Oxford from enclosing this area. Cripley Meadow to the south had previously been enclosed by the town. Enclosure would have prevented villagers from using the land for pasture. There were battles for commoners' rights in 1553, 1649, 1762, and 1843. In 1892, there was an attempt to reduce Wolvercote Common by a small amount on its southern boundary. This caused a violent incident that became known as the Battle of Wolvercote. A commemorative stone on the canal seems to be related.

The Wolvercote Commoners' Committee was established in 1929 to manage the common land and to preserve other amenities in the village.

Along with Port Meadow and Wolvercote Green, Wolvercote Common has been a Site of Special Scientific Interest (SSSI) since 1955.

The Commons Registration Act 1965 has affected villagers' rights to the land detrimentally. Only houses registered at the time of the Act now have grazing rights attached, even if there is a change of ownership. In 1993, the Wolvercote Commoners' Committee resisted an attempt by Oxford City Council to take the common into its ownership.

== Gallery ==
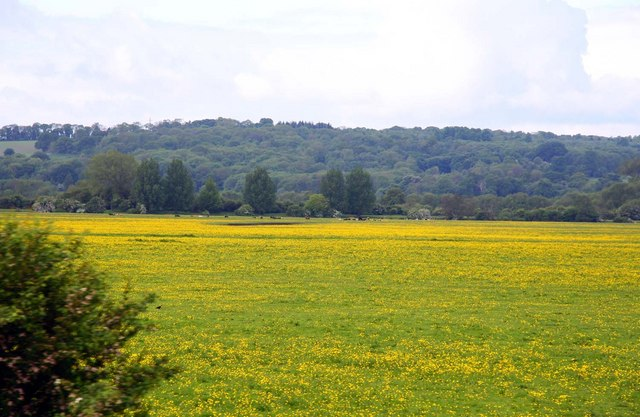
Wolvercote Common and Port Meadow

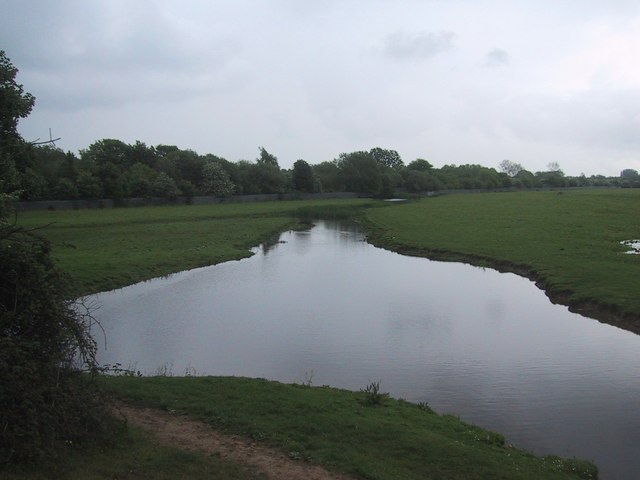
Water on Wolvercote Common

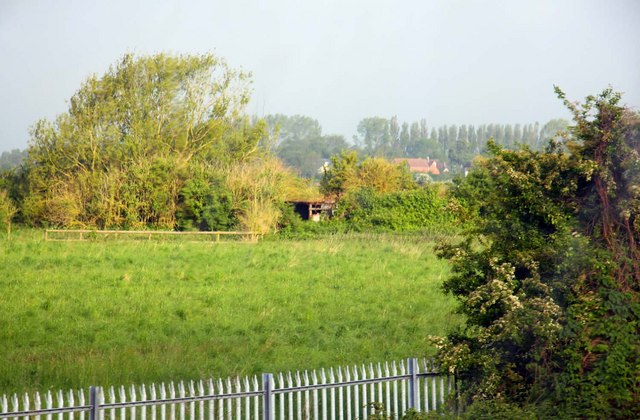
Shed in the hedgerow by Wolvercote Common

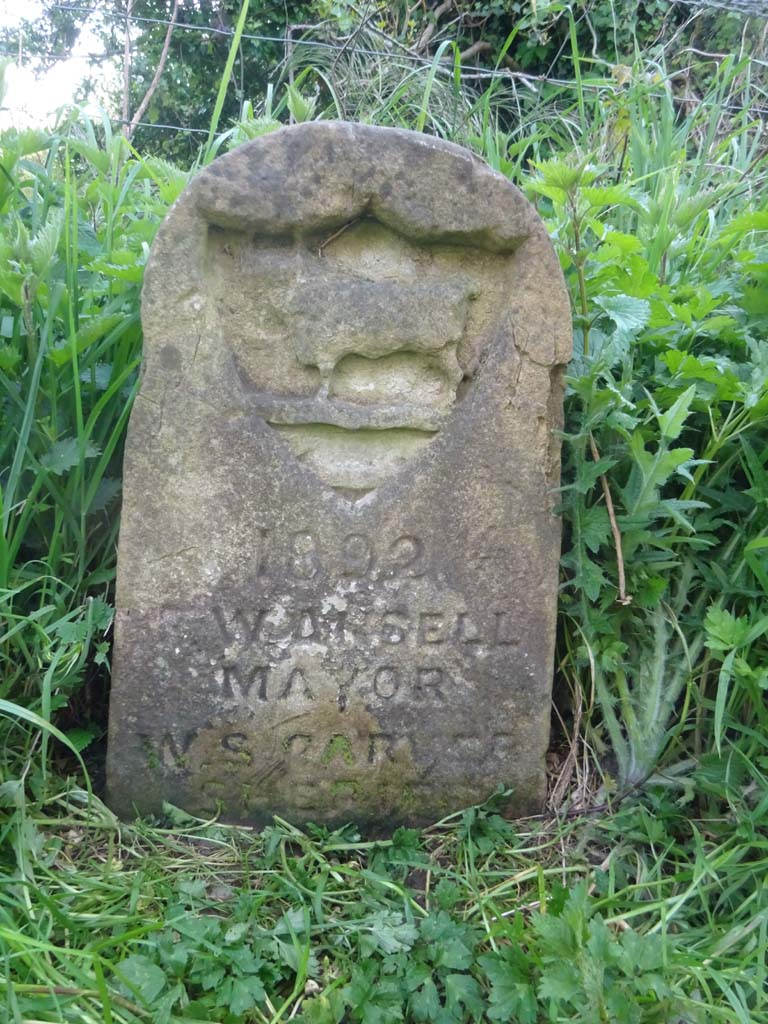
commemorative stone dated 1892, R Wansell mayor
