= Chalfont Road =

Road in North Oxford, England

Coordinates: 51.76923°N 1.26805°W

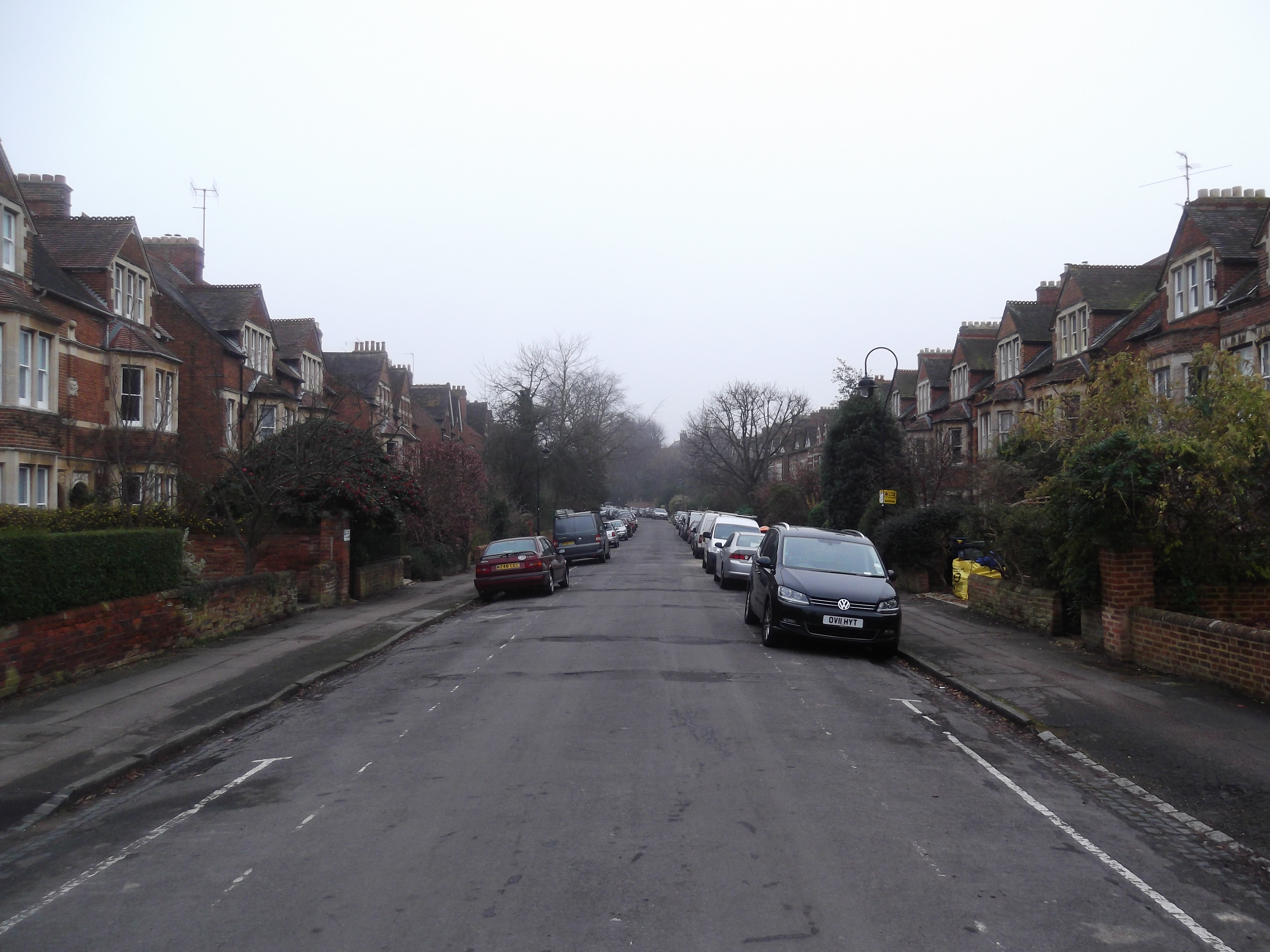
View from the north end of Chalfont Road looking south

Chalfont Road is a road in Walton Manor, North Oxford, England.

== Location ==
The road runs north–south between Frenchay Road to the north and Polstead Road to the south. To the west is Hayfield Road and to the east is Woodstock Road. The houses in Chalfont Road have been described as "small large house(s)" as opposed to the "large small house(s)" in the Southmoor Road area to the southwest.

== History ==
Houses in the road were originally leased between 1890 and 1904 as part of the North Oxford estate of St John's College. The houses were nearly all designed by Harry Wilkinson Moore. The provision of a tram service from the centre of Oxford to St Margaret's Road in 1882 made it possible to expand the building of the estate further north to Chalfont Road and Frenchay Road.

== Residents ==
The psychiatrist Anthony Storr (1920–2001), a Fellow of Green College, Oxford, lived in Chalfont Road. The computer scientists and mathematicians Sir Tony Hoare, Dana Scott, and Robin Wilson also lived in Chalfont Road.

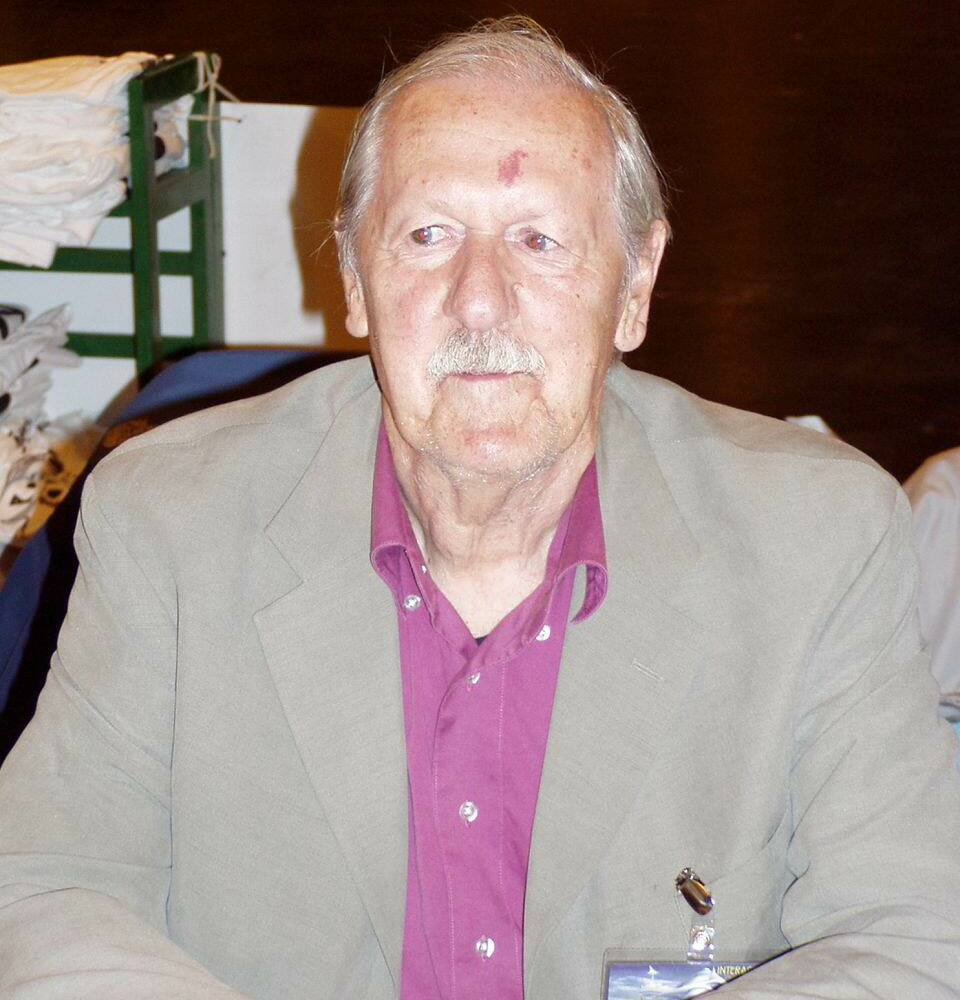
The author Brian Aldiss OBE (1925–2017)

== Literature ==
Chalfont Road is mentioned in the books Forgotten Life by Brian Aldiss and Lost and Found by Valerie Mendes (step-mother of the director Sam Mendes).
