= Port Meadow Halt railway station =

Former railway station in Oxfordshire, England

Coordinates: 51.7674°N 1.2734°W

Port Meadow Halt
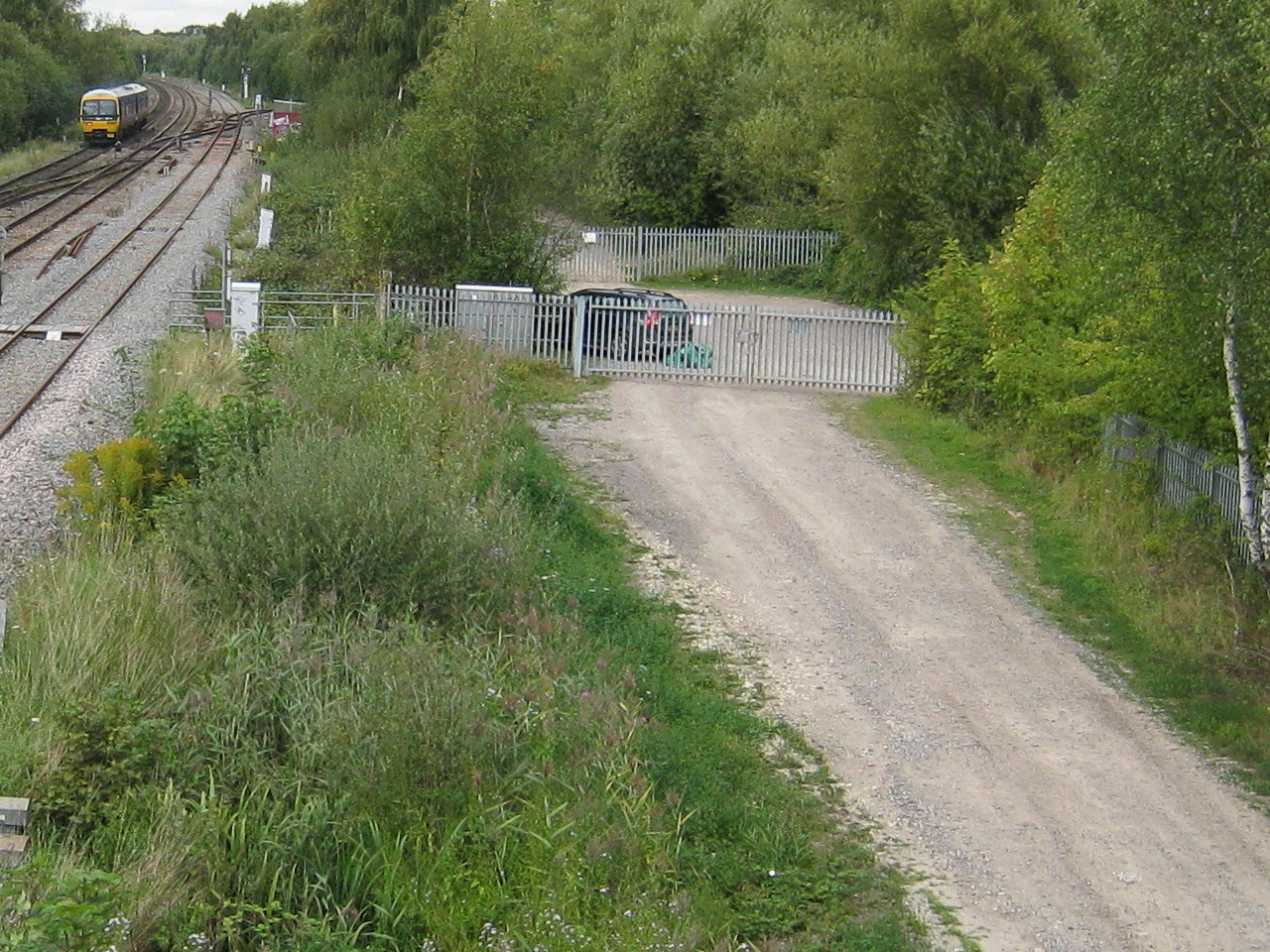
- Site of Port Meadow Halt railway station in September 2009. Station site in centre; train upper left is passing Oxford North Junction

General information
- Location: Oxford; England
- Grid reference: SP502079
- Platforms: 2

Other information
- Status: Demolished

History
- Original company: London & North Western Railway
- Post-grouping: London Midland & Scottish Railway

Key dates
- 20 August 1906: Opened as Summertown Halt
- January 1907: Renamed Port Meadow Halt
- 1 January 1917: Closed
- 5 May 1919: Re-opened
- 30 October 1926: Closed
Location

Port Meadow Halt was a railway station on the Varsity Line, between north Oxford and Port Meadow. The London & North Western Railway opened the halt as Summertown on 20 August 1906 and renamed it Port Meadow Halt in January 1907. It was closed between 1 January 1917 and 5 May 1919, and the London, Midland & Scottish Railway permanently closed it on 30 October 1926. It was located on the north side of a footbridge leading from the present-day Aristotle Lane into Port Meadow, close to an occupation crossing which also gave access to the up platform.

The opening of the station marked the inauguration of a rail motor car service between Oxford and Bicester. Journey time was 37 minutes and, other than Port Meadow and Bicester, the service called at Wolvercote Halt, Oxford Road Halt, Islip, Oddington Halt, Charlton Halt and Wendlebury Halt. On the opening day the rail motor ran hot at the end of a return trip from Bicester in the early part of the morning and a 2-4-2 locomotive hauling an 8-wheel corridor coach replaced it; a step-ladder had to be provided for passengers to alight as the halts were only constructed of sleepers laid at rail level. The rail motor service was withdrawn as a wartime economy measure in 1917 and restored in 1919. It was permanently withdrawn from 1926 due to the introduction of motorised bus services around Oxford.

== Route ==
Preceding station	Historical railways	Following station
Oxford Rewley Road; Line & station closed	London & North Western Railway; Varsity Line	Wolvercote Halt; Line open, station closed

== Sources ==
- Butt, R. V. J. (October 1995). The Directory of Railway Stations: details every public and private passenger station, halt, platform and stopping place, past and present (1st ed.). Sparkford: Patrick Stephens Ltd. ISBN 978-1-85260-508-7. OCLC 60251199. OL 11956311M.
- Little, E. (March 1930). "Portmeadow Halt, L.M.S.R.". The Why and the Wherefore. The Railway Magazine. Vol. 66, no. 393. Westminster: Railway Publishing Company Ltd. p. 223. ISSN 0033-8923.
- Mitchell, Vic; Smith, Keith (July 2005). Oxford to Bletchley. Country Railway Routes. Middleton Press. ISBN 1-904474-57-8.
- Waters, Laurence (1986). Oxford. Rail Centres. London: Ian Allan Publishing. ISBN 0-7110-1590-2.
