= Burgess Field Nature Park =

Nature reserve in Oxford, England

Coordinates: 51.774257°N 1.278283°W

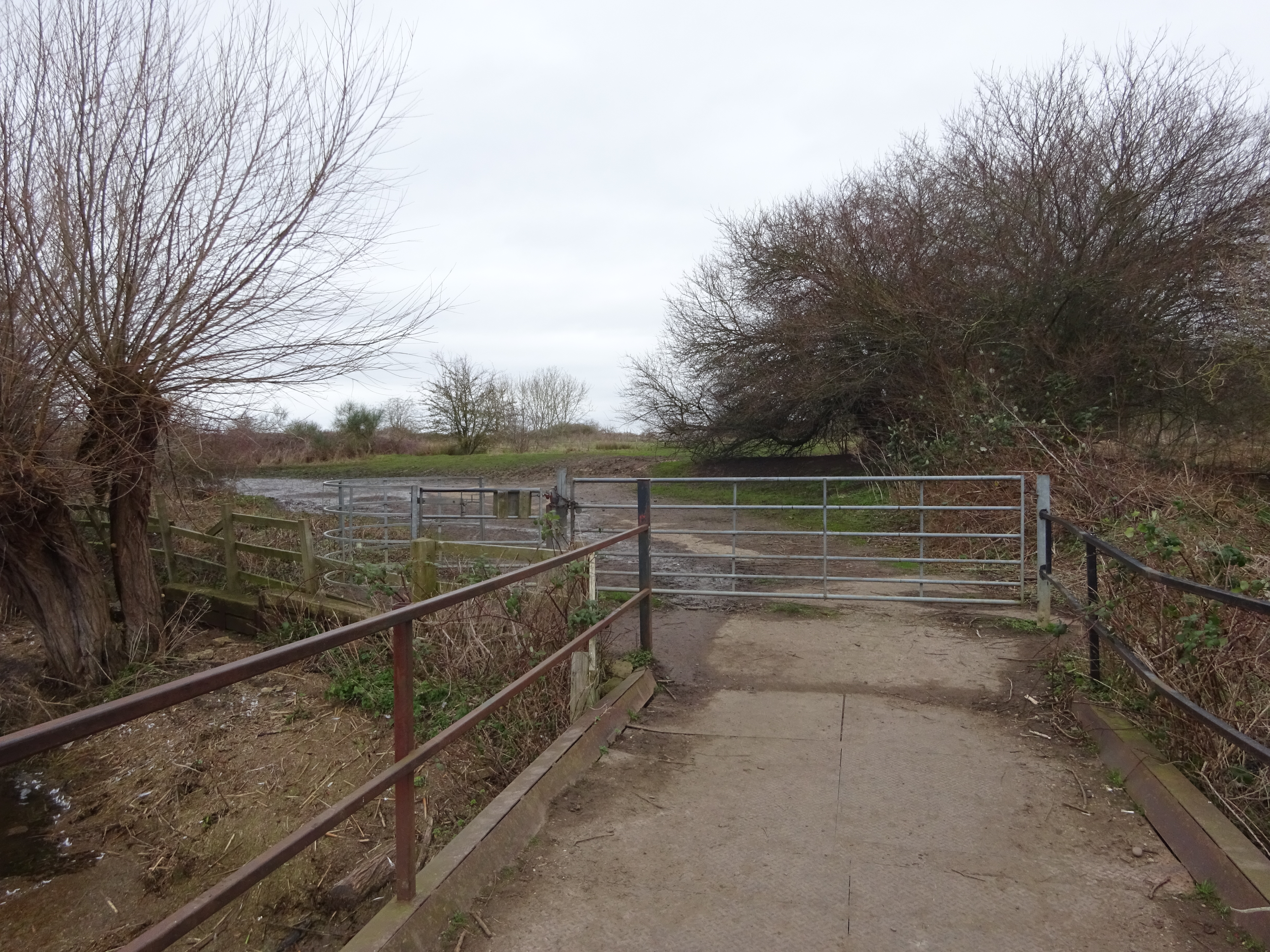
- The southern entrance of the nature reserve

- Location within Oxfordshire
- OS grid reference: SP 49725 07491
- Civil parish: unparished
- District: Oxford
- Shire county: Oxfordshire
- Region: South East
- Country: England
- Sovereign state: United Kingdom
- Post town: Oxford
- Postcode district: OX2 0NL
- Dialling code: 01865
- Police: Thames Valley
- Fire: Oxfordshire
- Ambulance: South Central
- UK Parliament: Oxford West and Abingdon
- Website: friendsofburgessfield.co.uk

Burgess Field Nature Park (also known as Burgess Field) is a nature reserve next to Port Meadow, Oxford, in Oxfordshire, England, managed by Oxford City Council.

== Overview ==
The site is between Port Meadow to the west and the railway line to the east, just north of the Aristotle Lane entrance to Port Meadow and the Trap Ground Allotments. The reserve is on a reclaimed landfill site and is approximately 30 hectares (74 acres) in area. There are open grass areas, some woodland, and a path around the edge of the site, as well as some paths crossing the site. Wildlife includes birds such as cuckoo, short-eared owl and jack snipe.

The site was used for landfill until the 1980s and is thus higher than Port Meadow, which regularly floods. The area was landscaped, with trees and hedge planting in the 1990s. The name may derive from the burgesses who endowed Godstow Nunnery with land.

== John Thompson ==
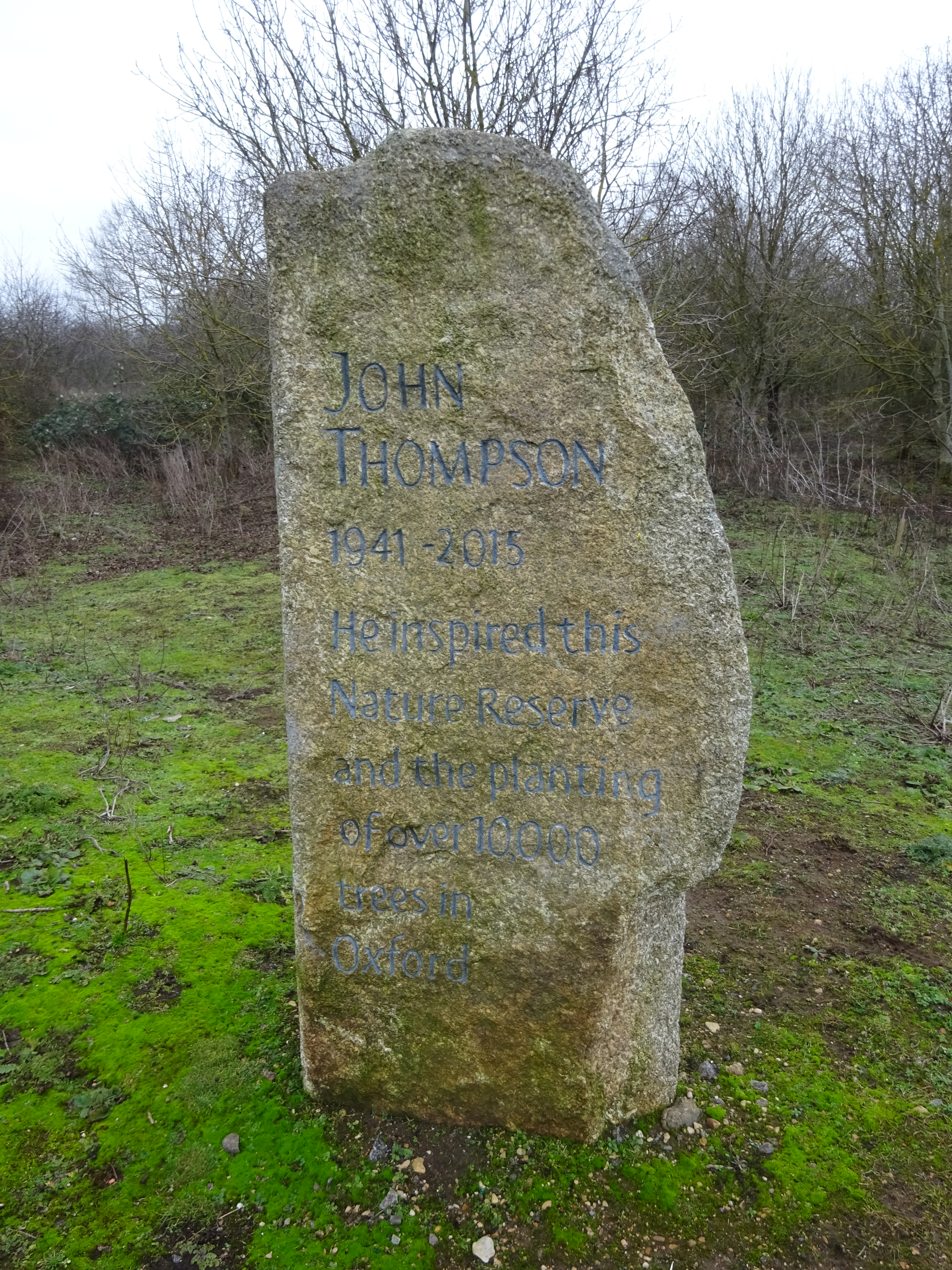
John Thompson memorial stone

The site includes a memorial stone to John Thompson (1941–2015), the city of Oxford's landscape architect, who inspired the nature reserve and planted over 10,000 trees in Oxford.

== Friends of Burgess Field ==
There is a Friends of Burgess Field organization, formed in 2018. Volunteers help to maintain the site.

== See also ==
- Hook Meadow and The Trap Grounds
- Trap Grounds
