= Polstead Road =

Road in North Oxford, England

Coordinates: 51°46′04″N 1°16′04″W

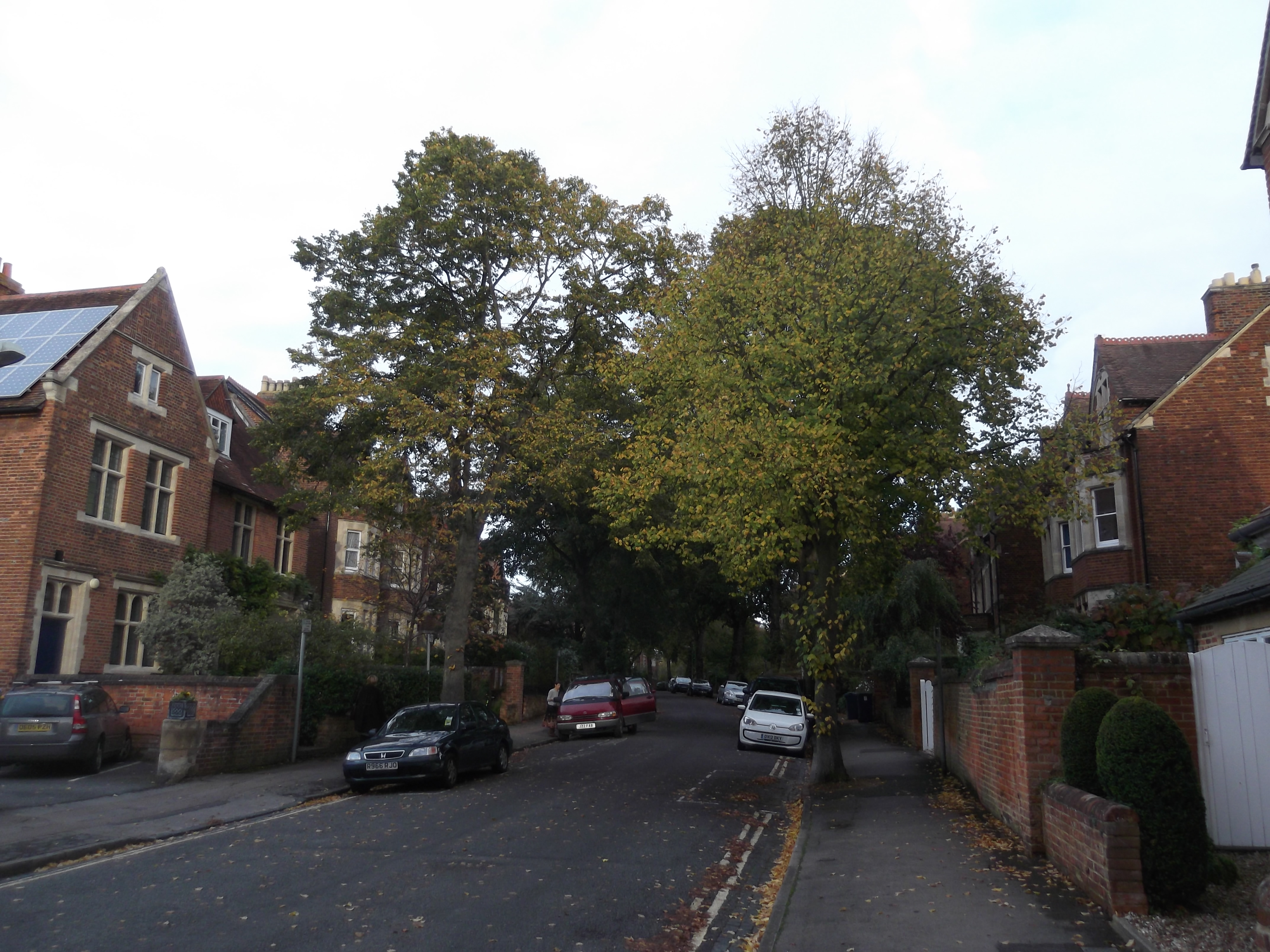
View east from the junction with Kingston Road and Hayfield Road

Polstead Road is a residential road that runs between Kingston Road and Hayfield Road to the west and the Woodstock Road to the east, in the suburb of North Oxford, England. Halfway along it forms the southern junction of Chalfont Road. The road is probably named after the village of Polstead in the county of Suffolk.

== Overview ==
The houses in Polstead Road were designed by Harry Wilkinson Moore and built between 1887 and 1894.

St Margaret's Institute Community Centre was the first building constructed on Polstead Road, following a subscription by parishioners of St Philip and St James Church in 1889 "for the building of a Working Men's Institute, 'to provide rational amusement and instruction for working men of any creed, sect, or opinions, who may thus be kept out of public houses'".

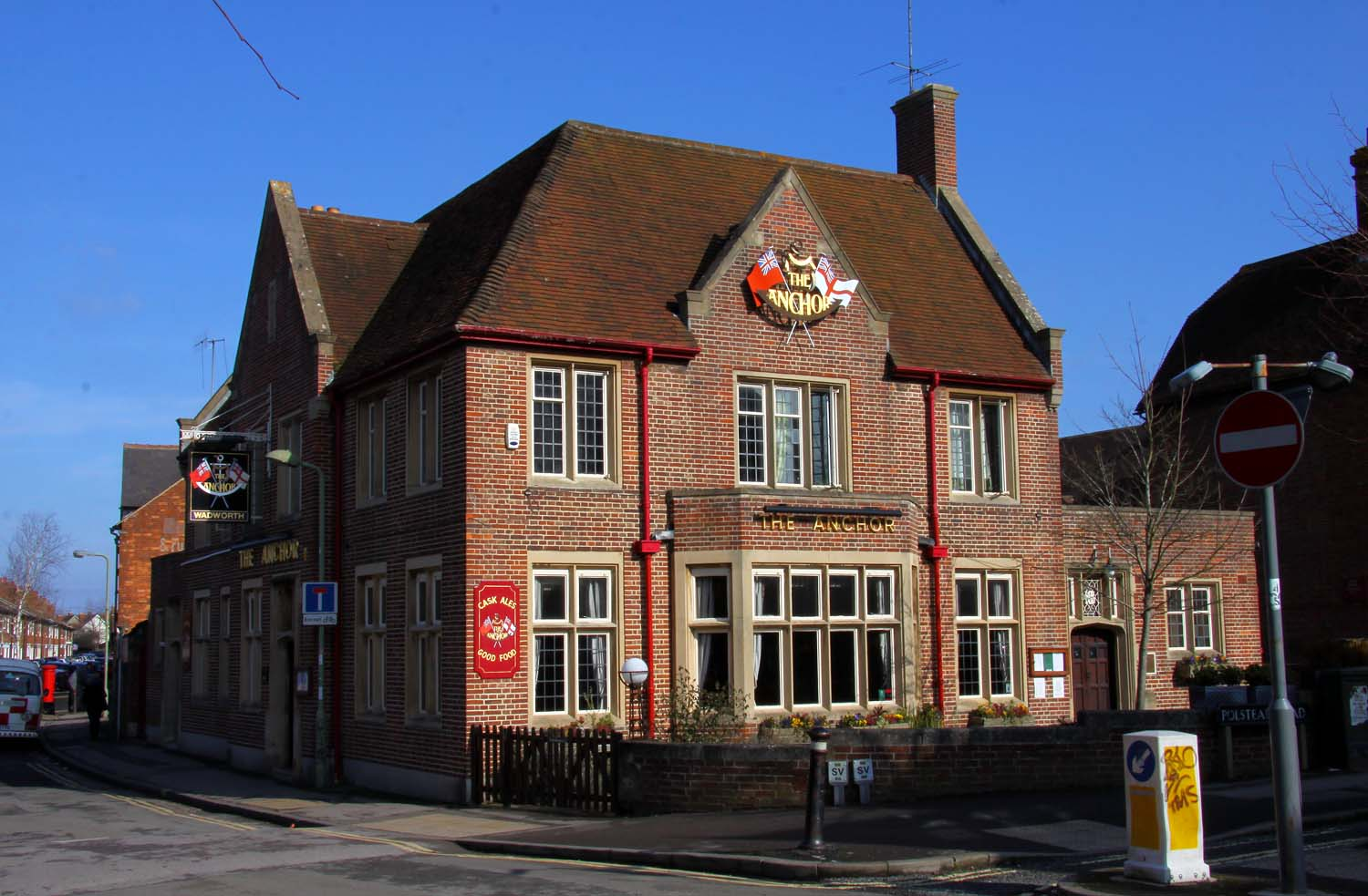
The Anchor public house on the corner of Polstead Road and Hayfield Road

The Anchor Inn is located at the corner of Hayfield Road and Polstead Road at the western end.

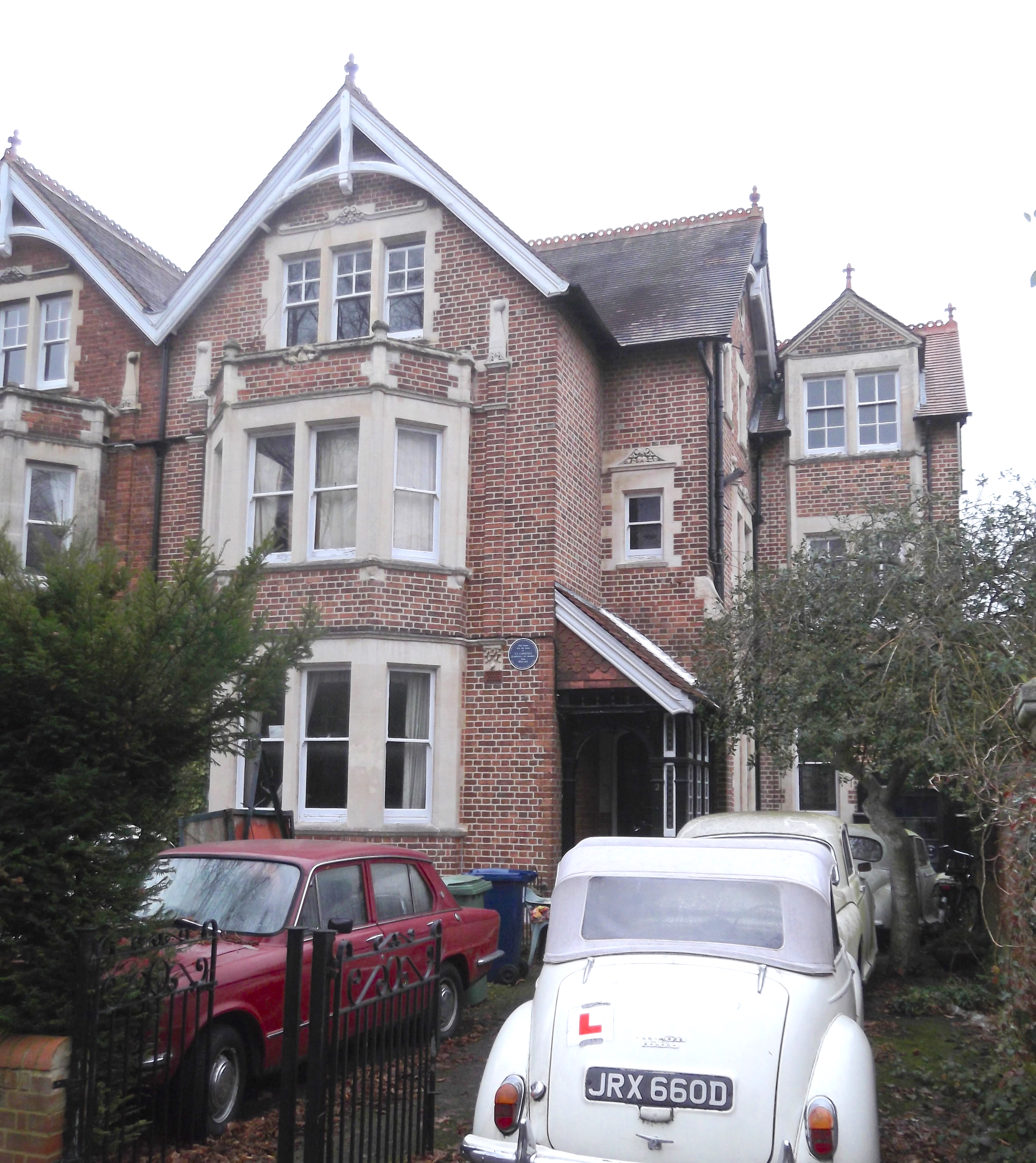
Lawrence of Arabia's childhood home from 1896 to 1921 at 2 Polstead Road

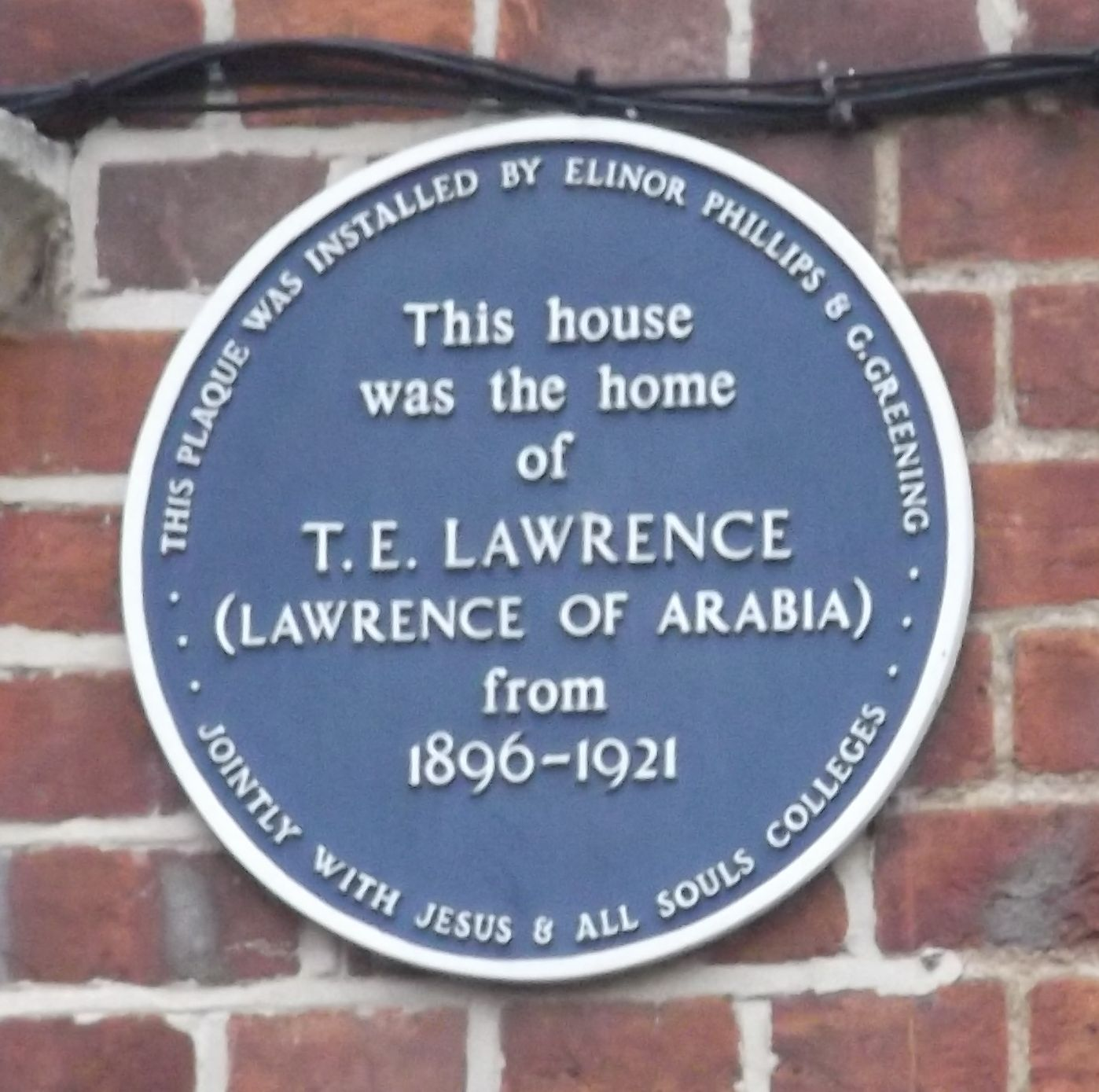
Blue plaque on Lawrence's former home

== Lawrence family ==
The most well-known resident was T. E. Lawrence (1888–1935), later known as 'Lawrence of Arabia'. The son of Thomas Chapman (1846-1919; who became, in 1914, Sir Thomas Chapman, 7th Baronet), an Anglo-Irish nobleman, he was brought up in a house (No. 2) on this road and a blue plaque records the fact. The future Sir Thomas Chapman, the 7th Baronet of Killua Castle in County Westmeath, Ireland, separated from his wife to live with his daughters' governess, Sarah Junner, also known as Sarah Lawrence. They had five sons and the couple lived under the names of Mr and Mrs Lawrence, moving to No. 2, Polstead Road in the summer of 1896 with the aim that the children could receive a good education for a reasonable cost. T. E. Lawrence attended the City of Oxford High School for Boys in central Oxford. Here also was born his youngest brother, A. W. Lawrence, who went on to become the Laurence Professor of Classical Archaeology at Cambridge University in the 1940s.

The house is a substantial semi-detached red-brick house that had been built approximately six years before the Lawrences moved there. They built a bungalow in the garden especially for Lawrence because the house was not large enough to accommodate the entire family. 2 Polstead Road remained the Lawrence family home until 1921. Lawrence was in residence when he departed for the First World War.

In January 2017, it was reported that Oxford City Council had failed to gain Grade II listed status for the Lawrence home, leaving its future in doubt.

The house was offered for sale in 2018 for £2.95 million.
