= Frenchay Road =

Road in North Oxford, England

Coordinates: 51.7704°N 1.2684°W

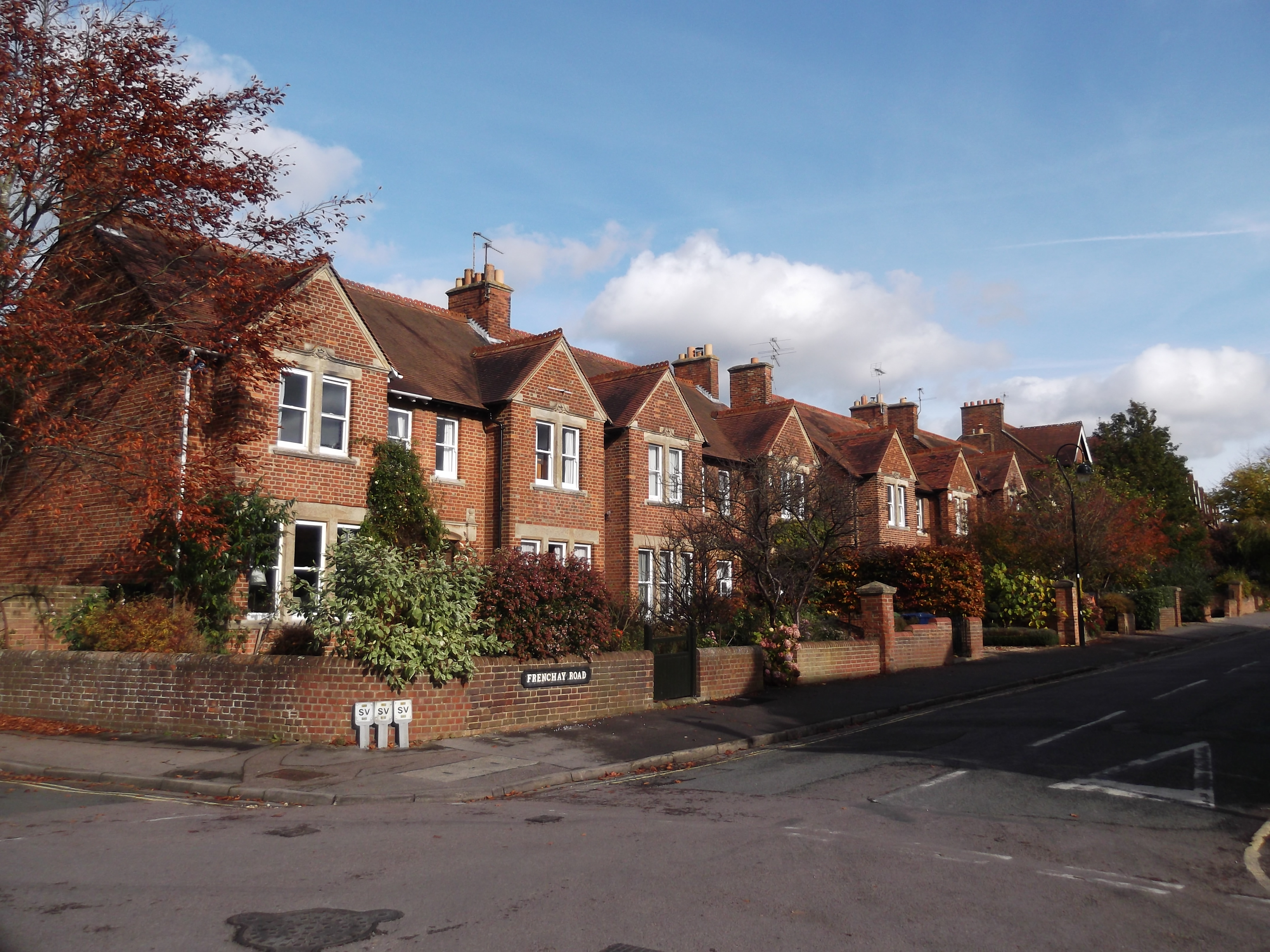
View east along Frenchay Road at the junction with Hayfield Road.

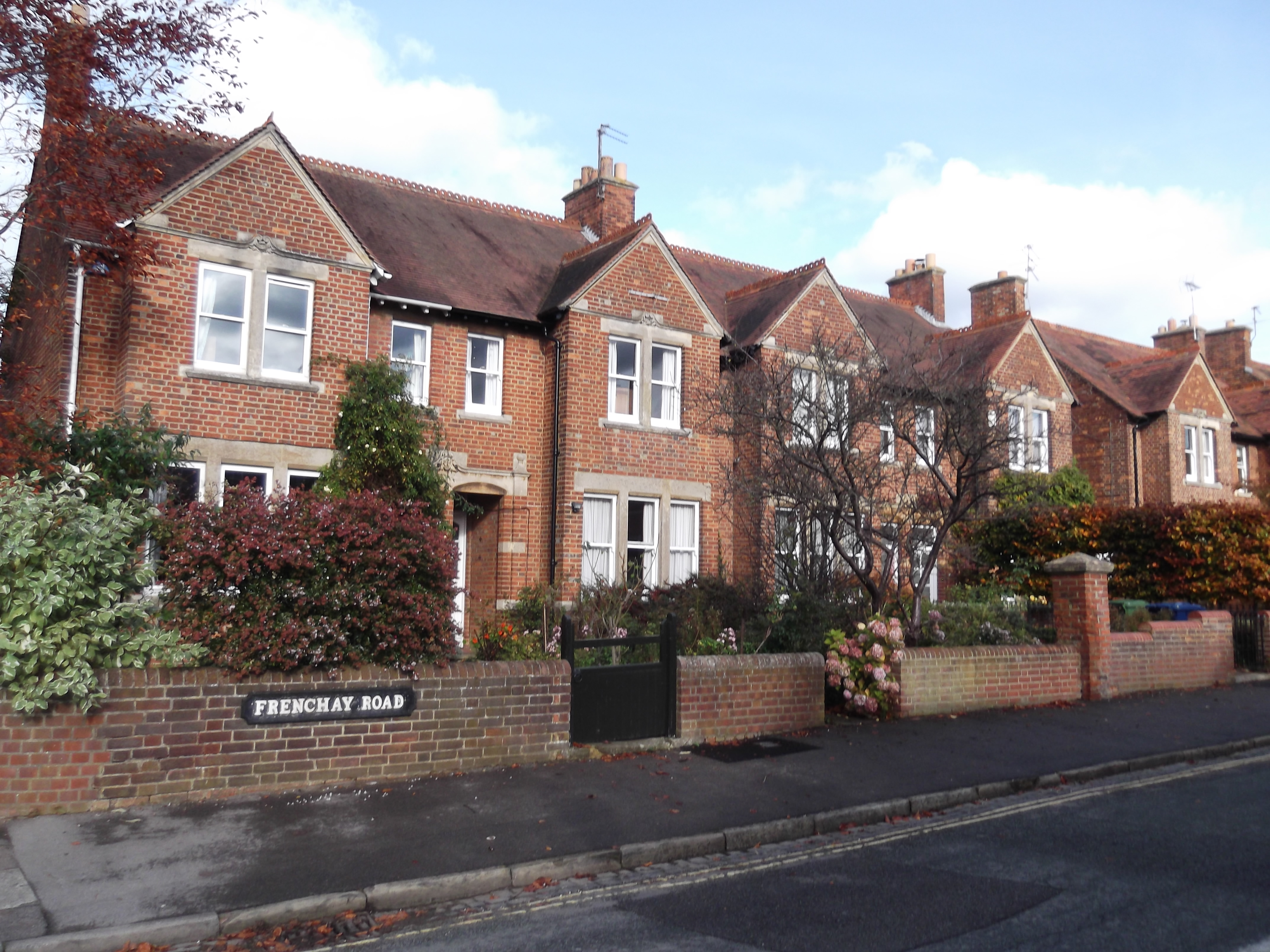
Houses on the north side of the old part of Frenchay Road.

Frenchay Road is a residential road in Walton Manor, North Oxford, England.

The oldest part of the road runs east–west. At the eastern end is a junction with Woodstock Road (A4144), a major arterial road out of Oxford to the north. Opposite and slightly to the south is Staverton Road. Chalfont Road leads south from halfway along the original part of the road. To the west is a junction with Bainton Road to the north and Hayfield Road to the south. The road continued over the Frenchay Road Bridge on the Oxford Canal, formerly to commercial premises by the railway line. More recently the road has been extended to the west of the canal with a bend to the north and newer residential development, The Waterways housing estate dating from 2000 to 2006, doubling the length of the road. Immediately to the southwest of Frenchay Road Bridge on the canal is the entrance to the Trap Grounds nature reserve.

All the original houses were designed by the leading North Oxford architect Harry Wilkinson Moore and were first leased between 1897 and 1906. Many were built by John Money. The road forms the approximate northern boundary of the original North Oxford development by St John's College, Oxford, along with Staverton Road and Marston Ferry Road to the east. The original houses were semi-detached residences. Newer homes are flats, maisonettes, and terraced houses.

The Scottish educational missionary to Calcutta and Orientalist John Nicol Farquhar (1861–1929) lived at 11 Frenchay Road. The road is mentioned in the book A Death in Oxford by Richard MacAndrew.
