= Port Meadow, Oxford =

Ancient English meadow near the River Thames

Coordinates: 51.770°N 1.284°W

Port Meadow
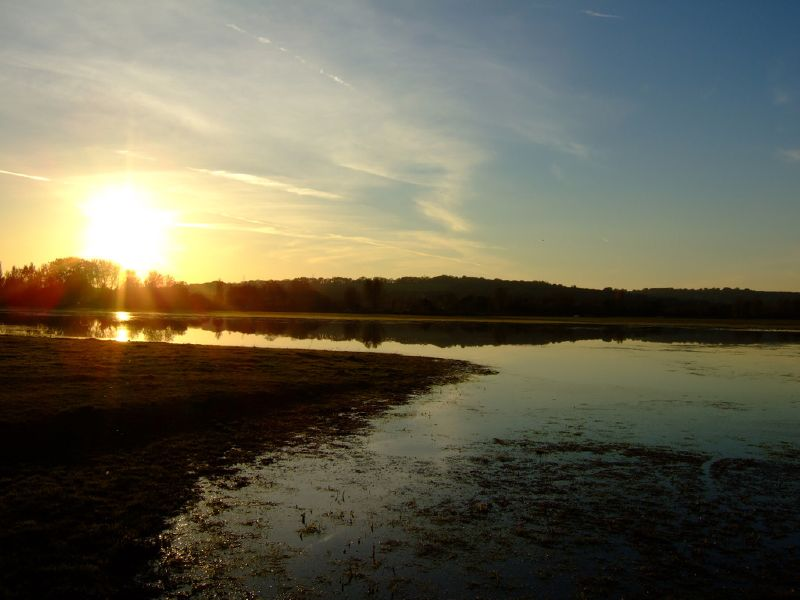
- Sunset over Port Meadow

- Location within Oxfordshire
- OS grid reference: SP495085
- Civil parish: unparished
- District: Oxford
- Shire county: Oxfordshire
- Region: South East
- Country: England
- Sovereign state: United Kingdom
- Post town: Oxford
- Postcode district: OX2
- Dialling code: 01865
- Police: Thames Valley
- Fire: Oxfordshire
- Ambulance: South Central
- UK Parliament: Oxford West and Abingdon
- Website: Oxford City Council

Port Meadow is a large meadow of open common land beside the River Thames to the north and west of Oxford, England.

== Overview ==
The meadow is an ancient area of grazing land, still used for horses and cattle, and according to legend has never been ploughed, at least for around 4,000 years. It is said that in return for helping to defend the kingdom against the marauding Danes, the Freemen of Oxford were given the 300 acres (120 ha) of pasture next to the River Thames by Alfred the Great who, legend has it, founded the city in the 10th century (although Alfred actually died in the 9th century). The Freemen's collective right to graze their animals free of charge is recorded in the Domesday Book of 1086 and has been exercised ever since. The name may come from Portman, an earlier term for Freeman.

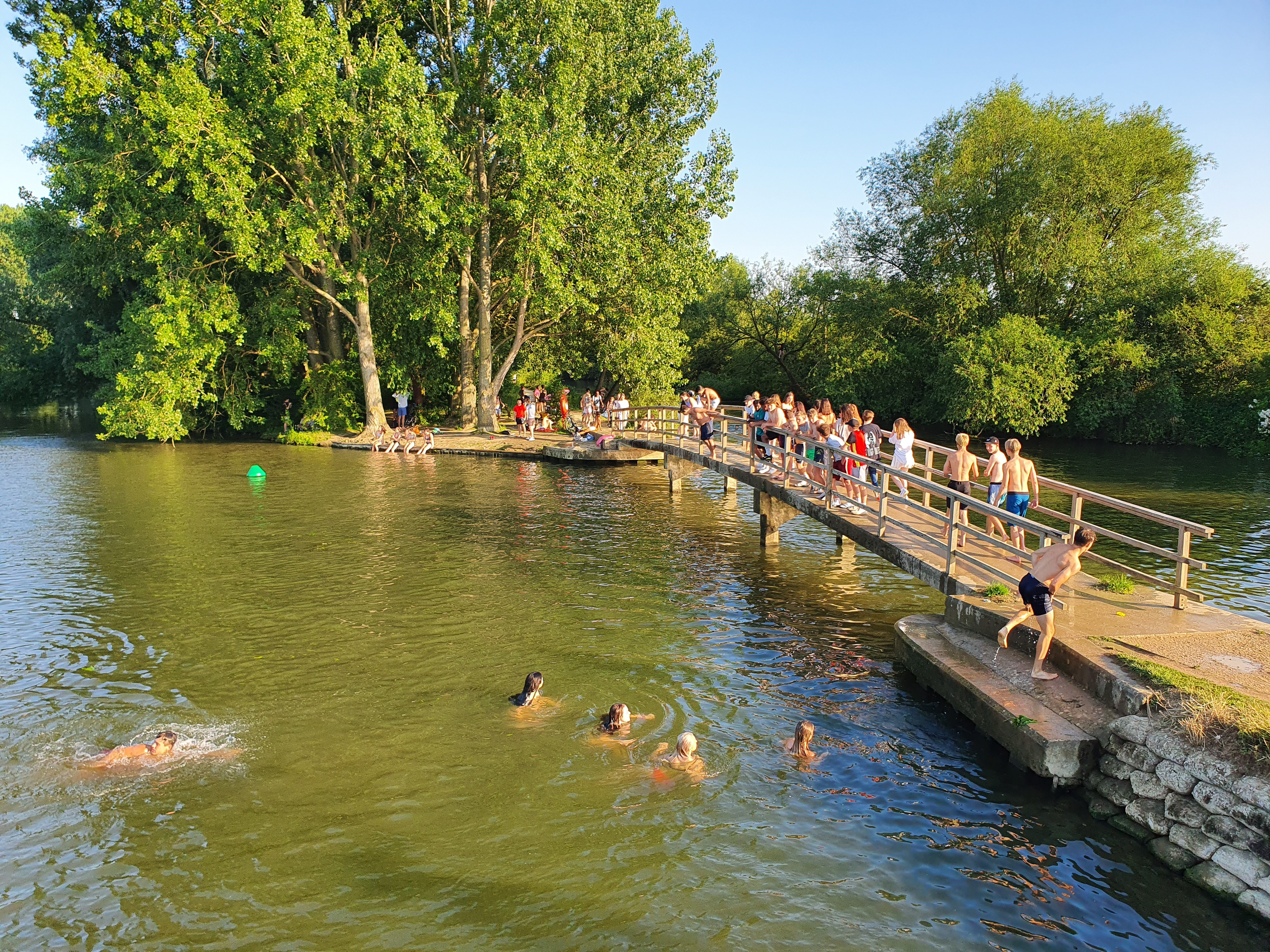
Swimmers at Port Meadow, bathing at the confluence of the River Thames and the Castle Mill Stream.

The meadow runs from Jericho to Wolvercote (where north of the Shiplake Ditch it becomes Wolvercote Common) along the east (left) bank of the River Thames, with the Cotswold Line railway, the Oxford Canal and the suburb of North Oxford further to the east, and the village of Binsey to the west. Access to Port Meadow is via Walton Well Road or Aristotle Lane in the south (or from the south via Roger Dudman Way or the Thames Path) or from Godstow Road, Wolvercote via Wolvercote Common in the north.

It is a typical English flood-meadow and is a favourite area for walking, with easy access from the city of Oxford. It is also a Site of Special Scientific Interest. As it has not been ploughed, the flora contains undomesticated, rare and archaic plants and seeds, which are the subject of enquiry by environmentalists and scientists and various ongoing research projects at the University of Oxford as of 2025. At the southern end of the meadow is Fiddler's Island in the River Thames. In the winter the meadow sometimes floods; if frozen it forms a huge and relatively safe area for skating. In late spring vast areas are carpeted with buttercups. Horses, cattle and geese graze the meadow and many birds can often be seen.

At the eastern edge of Port Meadow, just north of the entrance from Aristotle Lane, is Burgess Field, a reclaimed landfill site and home to a nature reserve, managed by Oxford City Council. It covers an area of about 35 hectares (86 acres); a circular path around the edge passes through some small copses.

Port Meadow is one of the most popular locations in Oxford for recreation activities such as walking, running, cycling and swimming in the adjacent River Thames. During days of fair weather the banks of the River Thames in the Meadow are often lined with people enjoying the natural environs. The meadow is also popular with photographers and bird-watchers.

== History ==
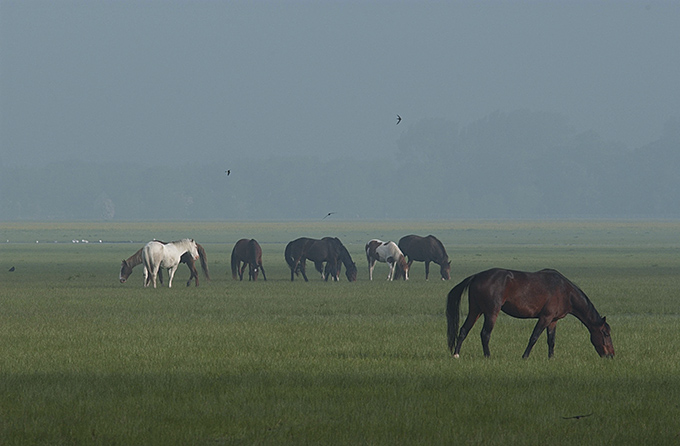
Horses in the mist on Port Meadow

The River Thames (known as the Isis in this area) flows past this large grazing meadow. This is where the Reverend Charles Lutwidge Dodgson (Lewis Carroll) and the Reverend Robinson Duckworth rowed up the river on 4 July 1862 with three young girls — Lorina, Alice, and Edith Liddell. While journeying slowly from Folly Bridge to near Godstow, Dodgson began at their request to make up a story that later was expanded into Alice's Adventures in Wonderland.

Because the meadow appears never to have been ploughed, it contains well-preserved archaeological remains, some of which survive as residual earthworks. Of particular note are several Bronze Age round barrows, an area of Iron Age settlement, the walls of a medieval monastic foundation for nuns which was confiscated and made into a royal private residence after the Church of England parted ways with Catholicism under Henry VIII, and the foundations of 17th-century fortifications from the Parliamentary siege of Oxford during the English Civil War.

In the 17th and 18th centuries, the meadow was used for horse racing, and low stone bridges laid over washes and ditches for this purpose still survive.

During the First World War part of Port Meadow was used to train the Royal Flying Corps and turned into a military aerodrome. Fifteen air crew and pilots were killed flying from Port Meadow or close by. In 1940, during the Second World War, a camp was set up on the meadow for military personnel evacuated from Dunkirk.

In the 1980s and 1990s, the meadow was known as a location for free festivals and raves.

Just across the Thames is Bossoms Boatyard, with a small marina and Medley Footbridge across the Thames. The Medley Sailing Club, the furthest upstream sailing club on the River Thames, is on the western bank. To the south is the start of the Castle Mill Stream and Cripley Meadow, largely consisting of allotments.

== Development ==
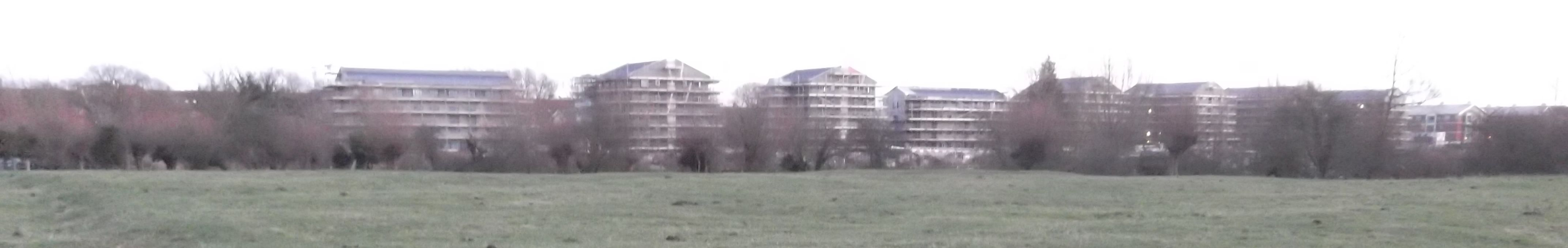
Panoramic view looking south from Port Meadow of new Oxford University Castle Mill graduate housing

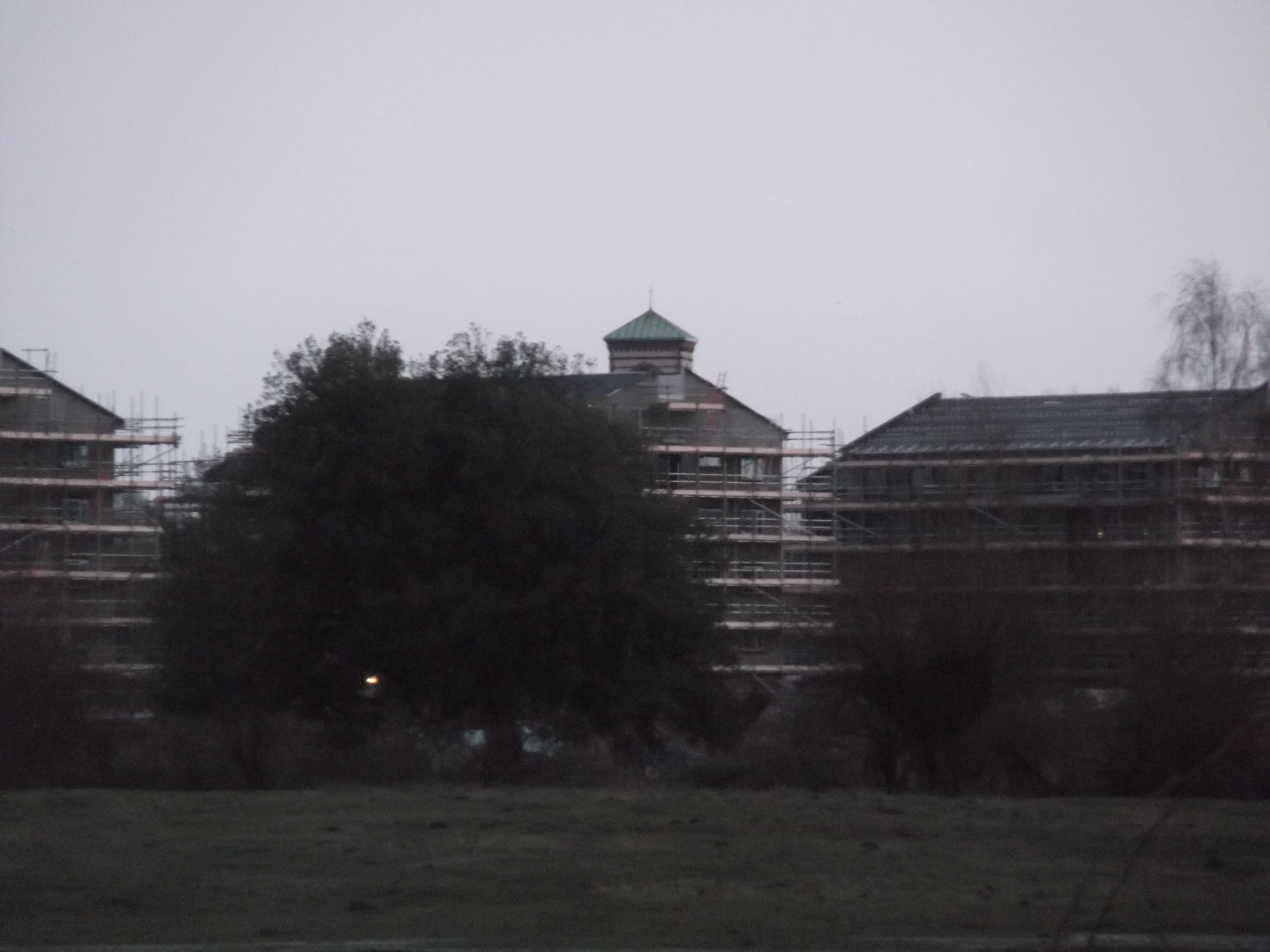
St Barnabas Church campanile obscured by new Oxford University Castle Mill graduate accommodation buildings, at the southern end of Port Meadow

From 2012, the Oxford University Estates Directorate, with the help of Longcross, have been developing the 2½ acre (one-hectare) Castle Mill site between the Cripley Meadow Allotments and the railway tracks, close to the southern end of Port Meadow, as extensive student accommodation.

The development was controversial, since the four to five storey blocks overlook Port Meadow. Campaigners warned of damage to views of Oxford. There was an online petition and a "Save Port Meadow" campaign was established in December 2012.

Concerns were raised by the Oxford Preservation Trust and the Green Party. The Oxford Times reported that "senior university members" were angry about the development, and that the impact had taken time to be realised. The development was likened to building a "skyscraper beside Stonehenge". In February 2013, Oxford City Council entered negotiations with Oxford University to reduce the height of the buildings by two storeys. On 7 May 2013, the Campaign to Protect Rural England applied to the High Court for judicial review of the decision to grant planning permission on the grounds that requirements for a full Environmental Impact Assessment (EIA) were not met.

In 2016, Oxford University proposed an array of mitigating techniques, including cladding and horizontal beams to "break up the vertical façade". Later, changes were made to the buildings in an attempt to reduce their visual impact.

== Popular culture ==
Theo Faron, the main character in P. D. James's 1992 dystopian novel The Children of Men walks across Port Meadow to reach the village of Binsey. Port Meadow figures as the site of a disputed housing development in the episode A Generation of Vipers of the Lewis TV detective series.

== See also ==
- Port Meadow Halt, a former railway station on the Varsity Line
- Burgess Field Nature Park, to the east
- Cripley Meadow, to the south
- Trap Ground Allotments, to the east
- Wolvercote Common, to the north
- Binsey Poplars, an 1879 poem by Gerard Manley Hopkins (1844–1889), written after the felling of a row of poplar trees on the River Thames overlooking Port Meadow
