= Curthoys =

Curthoys, Curthose, or Curthoise is an English surname. The surname is derived from the Old French curthose meaning "short stockings".

The name may have been popularised as the epithet of Robert Curthose (c. 1051–1134), who succeeded his father, William the Conqueror, as Duke of Normandy.

The surname is found recorded as Curtehose in 1210-11 and Curthose in 1287–8. Modern variants of the surname include Curthose and Curthoise.

Analysis of the 1881 Census in the United Kingdom shows that the surname was then mostly distributed in what is now the Bristol postal code area.

Some notable individuals with this surname include:

- Barbara Curthoys (1924–2000), Australian feminist, communist activist, and mother of:
  - Ann Curthoys (b. 1945), Australian historian
  - Jean Curthoys (b. 1947), Australian feminist philosopher

== See also ==
- Curtis
