= Dudman =

Dudman may refer to:

- Dudman, Iran (disambiguation)
- Graham Dudman (born 1963), British newspaper editor
- Leonard Dudman (1933–2004), Scottish international cricketer
- Nick Dudman, British make-up effects and creature designer for films
- Richard Dudman (1918–2017), American journalist
- Roger Dudman (died 1990), English Labour Party Mayor of Oxford
- Vic Dudman (1935–2009), Australian logician and teacher of logic
