= Oxford Down Carriage Sidings =

Train stabling point in Oxford, Oxfordshire

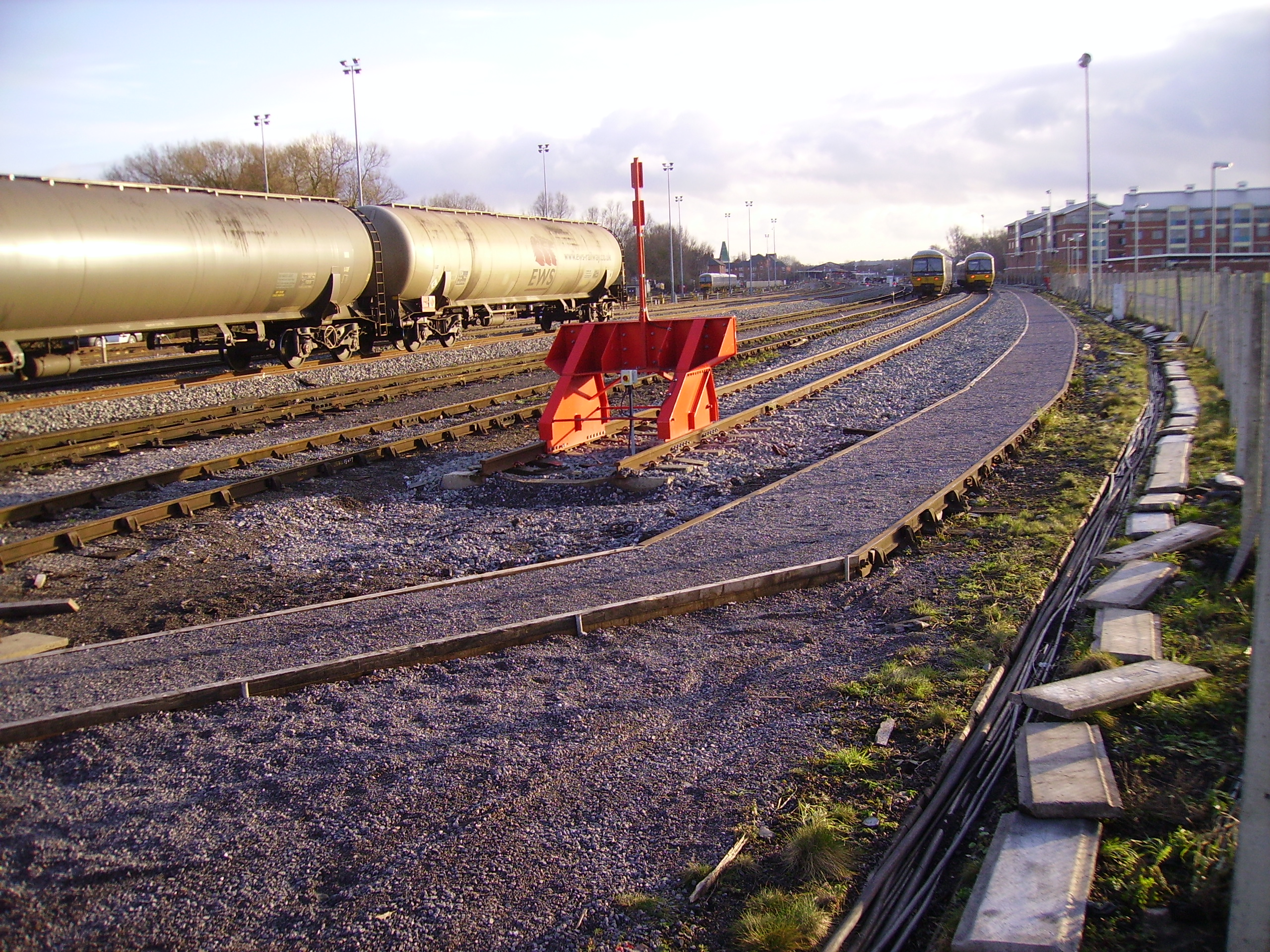
- View of the sidings from Roger Dudman Way

Location
- Location: Oxford, Oxfordshire
- Coordinates: 51.7587°N 1.2723°W

Characteristics
- Owner: Network Rail
- Type: DMU, Diesel

Oxford Down Carriage Sidings are located in Oxford, Oxfordshire, England, just north of Oxford station.

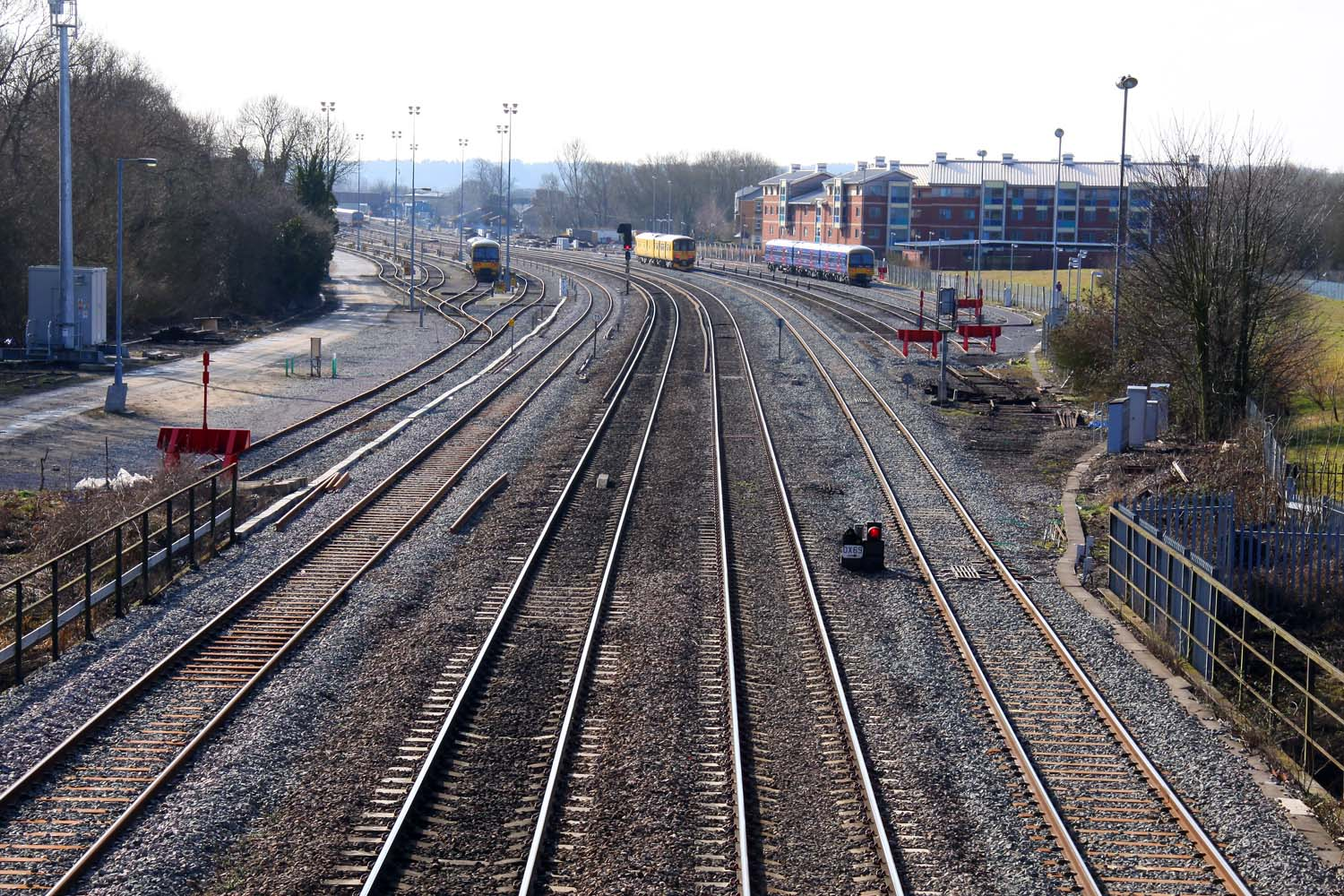
View from Walton Well Road Bridge in 2010: Down sidings on the right, Up sidings on the left

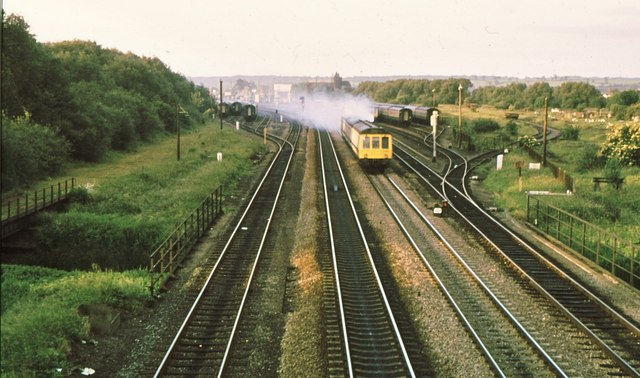
Similar view in 1980 with Cripley Meadow on the right

== Location ==
The sidings are located next to the Castle Mill blocks immediately to the west, graduate student accommodation provided by Oxford University. Beyond that is Cripley Meadow, now allotments.

On the other side of the main line to the east are the Oxford Up Carriage Sidings.

== Use ==
The sidings provide stabling for Great Western Railway's Class 165/166 Turbos, as well as Class 800 and Class 802 Intercity Express Trains (IETs). The sidings are also used in the reversal moves required to get units used on services between Didcot Parkway and Oxford from platform four to platform three at Oxford station.
