= Dowdeman =

Dowdeman or Dudman or Doodman (Persian: دودمان) may refer to:

- Dowdeman, Darab
- Dudman, Shiraz
