= Henry of Normandy =

Henry of Normandy may refer to:

- Henry I of England (died 1135), also Henry I, Duke of Normandy
- Henry II of England, (died 1189), also Henry II, Duke of Normandy
- Henry, spurious son of Robert Curthose, Duke of Normandy (died 1134)
