= Longcross (company) =

Former British construction company

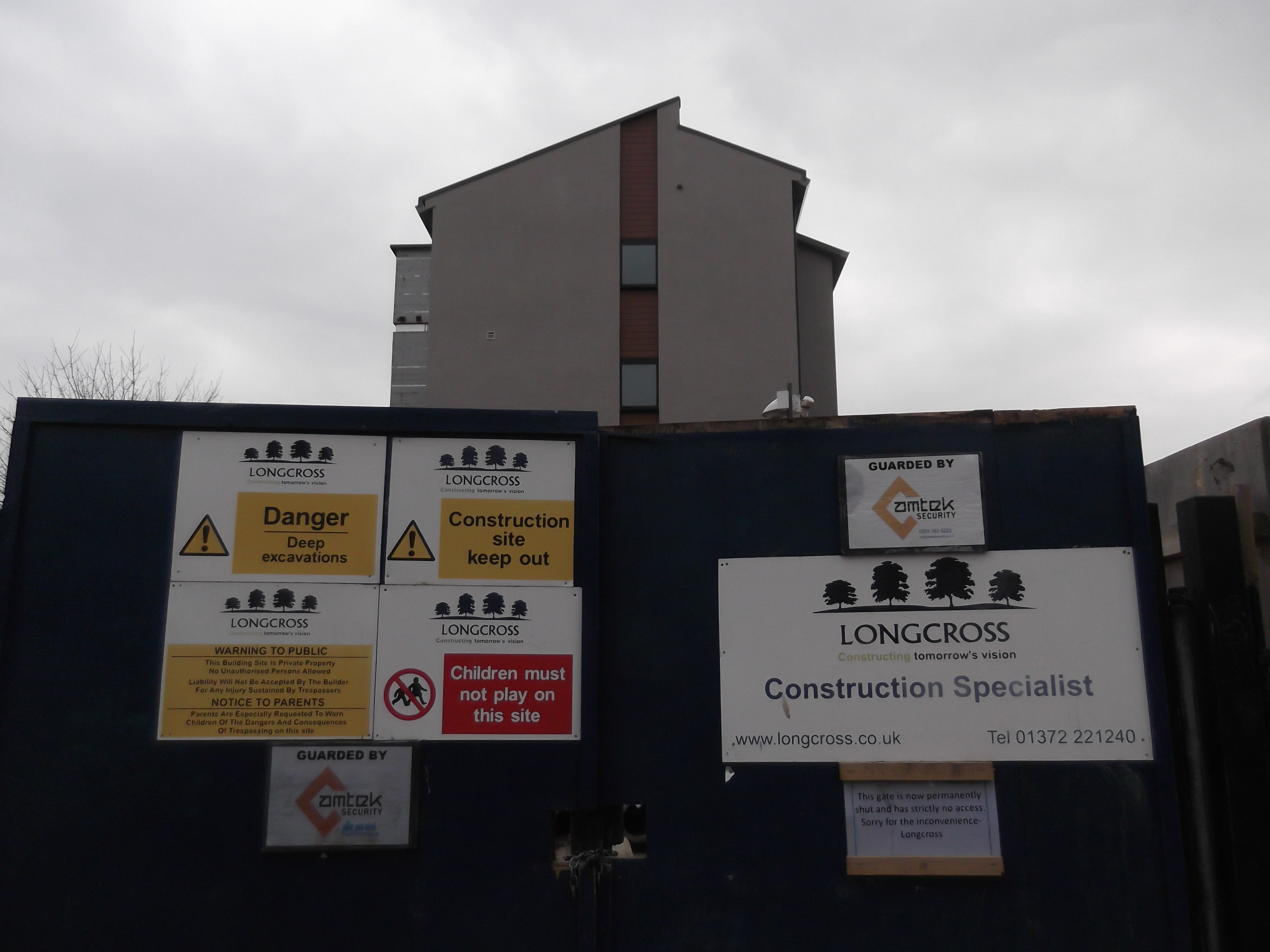
Longcross signs and gate at the north end of the Castle Mill construction site in Oxford, England.

Longcross was a British construction company which entered into administration in June 2015. The head office was based in Ashtead, Surrey, England.

The company undertook a number of projects for the University of Oxford, including at the Clarendon Laboratory, Denys Wilkinson Building, Mathematical Institute, Merton College, Queen Elizabeth House, Osler House, and a number of other departments. In June 2012, the New Radcliffe House on Walton Street, the new location of the Jericho Health Centre, on the Radcliffe Observatory Quarter development site, was completed by Longcross.

The main page of Longcross's website formerly stated: "We are known for our non-adversarial approach". In 2015, the company went into administration.

== Controversial development ==
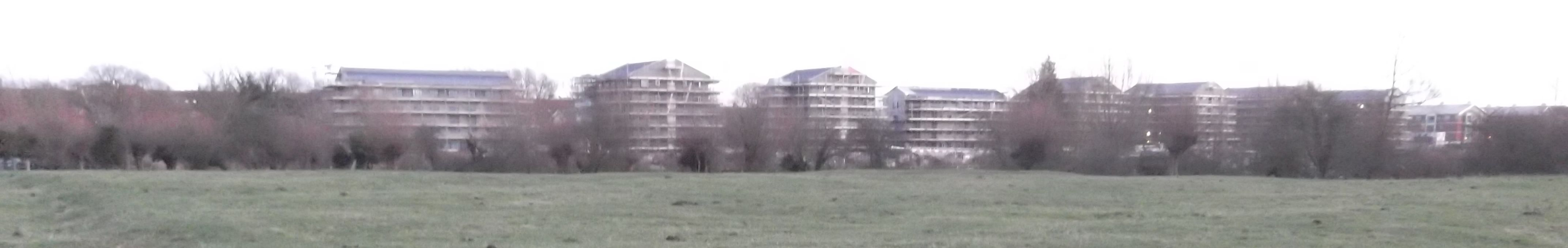
Panoramic view of Oxford University's new Castle Mill graduate housing built 2012–3 by Longcross on what was Cripley Meadow, looking south from Port Meadow, Oxford.

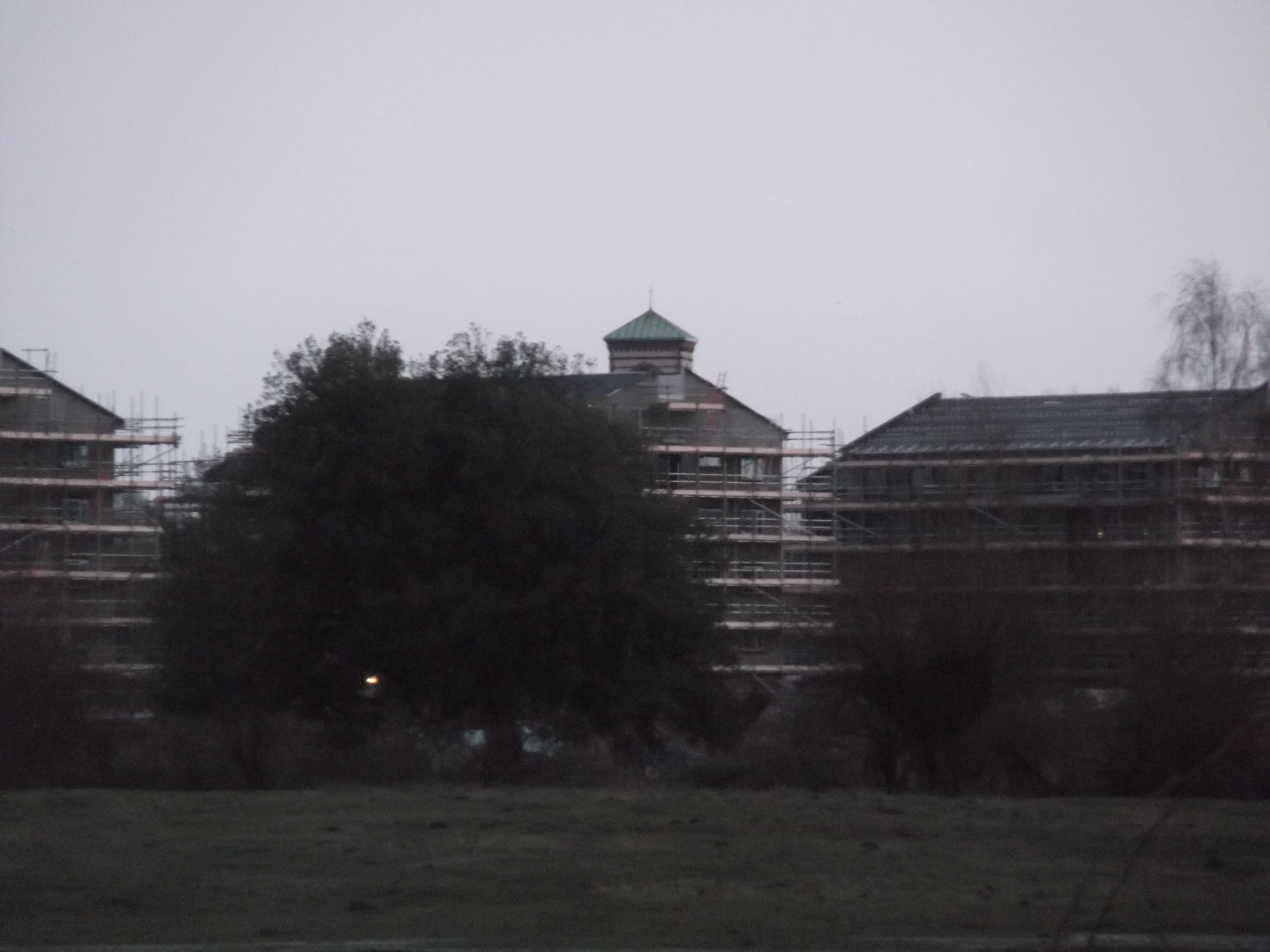
St Barnabas Church campanile obscured by new Oxford University Castle Mill graduate accommodation buildings constructed by Longcross, viewed from the southern end of Port Meadow.

From 2012, the Castle Mill site (400m × 25m) between the Cripley Meadow Allotments to the west and the railway tracks by the Castle Mill Stream to the east, north of Oxford railway station on Roger Dudman Way, was developed as extensive student accommodation for the Oxford University Estates Directorate (OUED) by Longcross. The development was controversial due to its visibility from Port Meadow, an historic area of undeveloped land to the north. Among other environmental issues, there are badgers on the site.

Anger was caused even among members of Oxford University. The development was likened to building a "skyscraper beside Stonehenge". In February 2013, Oxford City Council entered negotiations with Oxford University to reduce the height of the buildings by two storeys. Longcross states that "Engaging with the local community is vital to Longcross’ work as a considerate constructor and Castle Mill is no exception". and claims that the company is "known for [its] non-adversarial approach".

In a 'Considerate Constructor Scheme' (CCS) audit on the Castle Mill site, the auditor made remarks about:

- the site team that took part in a one-day event, organised by the public, to help clean the River Thames;
- the work with National Rail to ensure the long term safety of the Badger's, and the construction of a Badger run down one side of the site;
- rigorous environmental management controls in place and a clear focus on sustainable construction.

However, in May 2013, it emerged that pollution at Castle Mill had not been checked before work begin, as was required in the planning permission.

Longcross received the highest CCS score to date 48 out of 50, on the second audit at Castle Mill. Longcross was runner up in the Considerate Constructor Scheme in 2014.

In June 2013, Castle Mill was nominated for the 2013 Carbuncle Cup, an annual award by Building Design for "the ugliest building in the United Kingdom completed in the last 12 months." It is described as "A deeply unimaginative and impoverished design which would lower the spirits whatever its setting, but on the edge of one of central England’s most important and ancient landscapes, it is an outrage."
