= Castle Mill =

Housing complex of the University of Oxford

Coordinates: 51.76035°N 1.273191°W

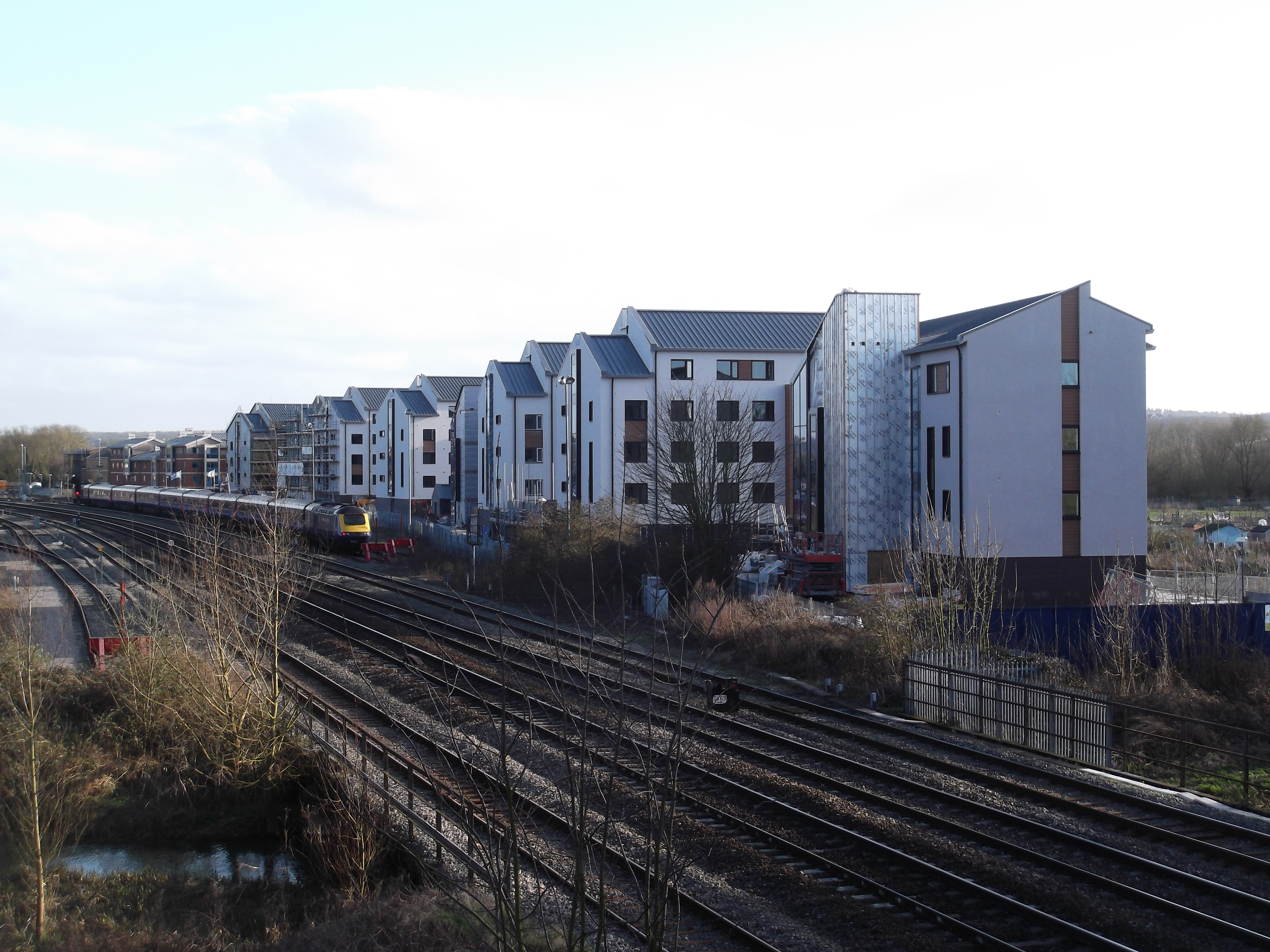
View from Walton Well Road railway bridge to the north, April 2013

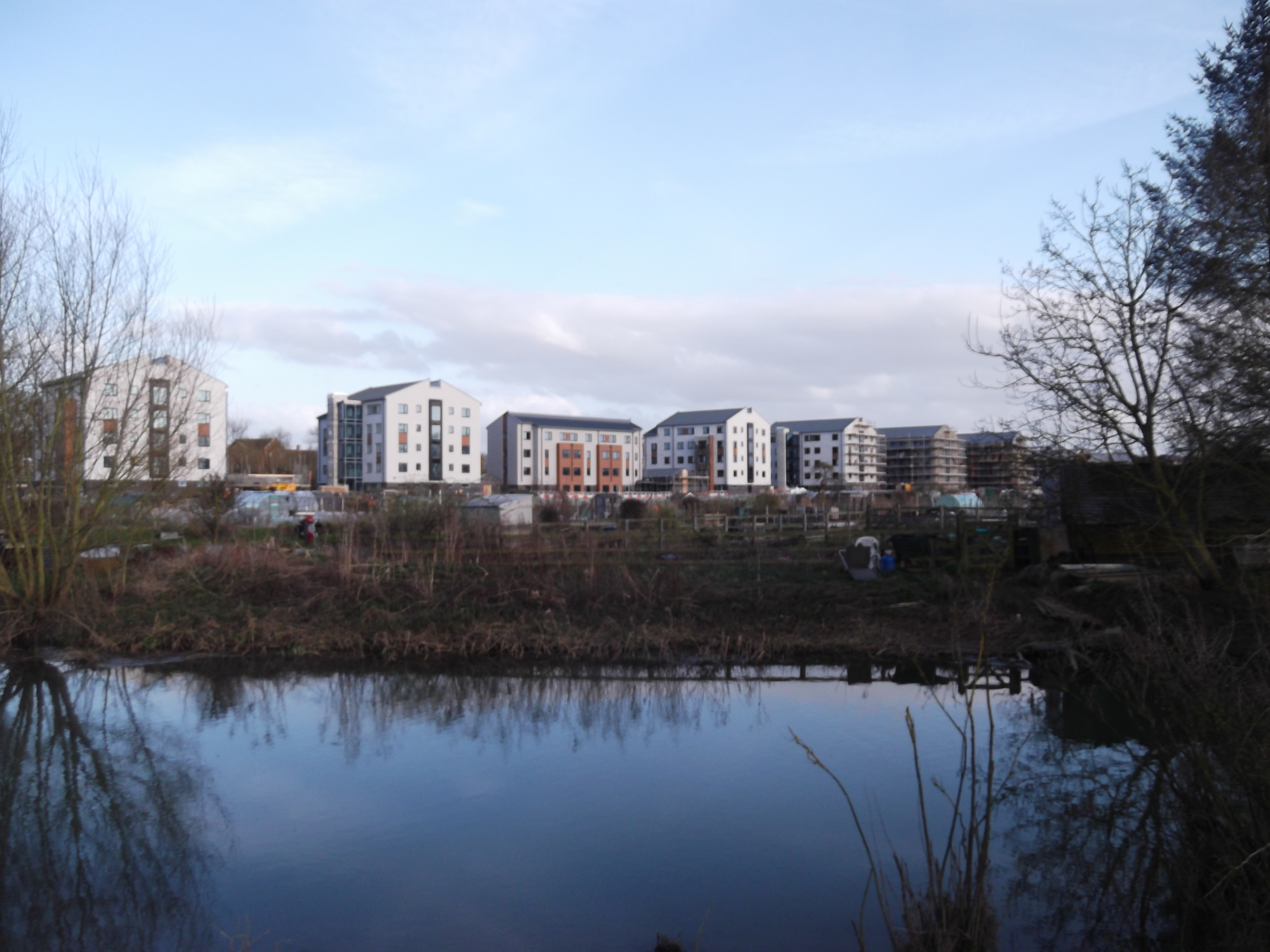
View from the Castle Mill Stream at the southern end of Port Meadow, across the Cripley Meadow allotments.

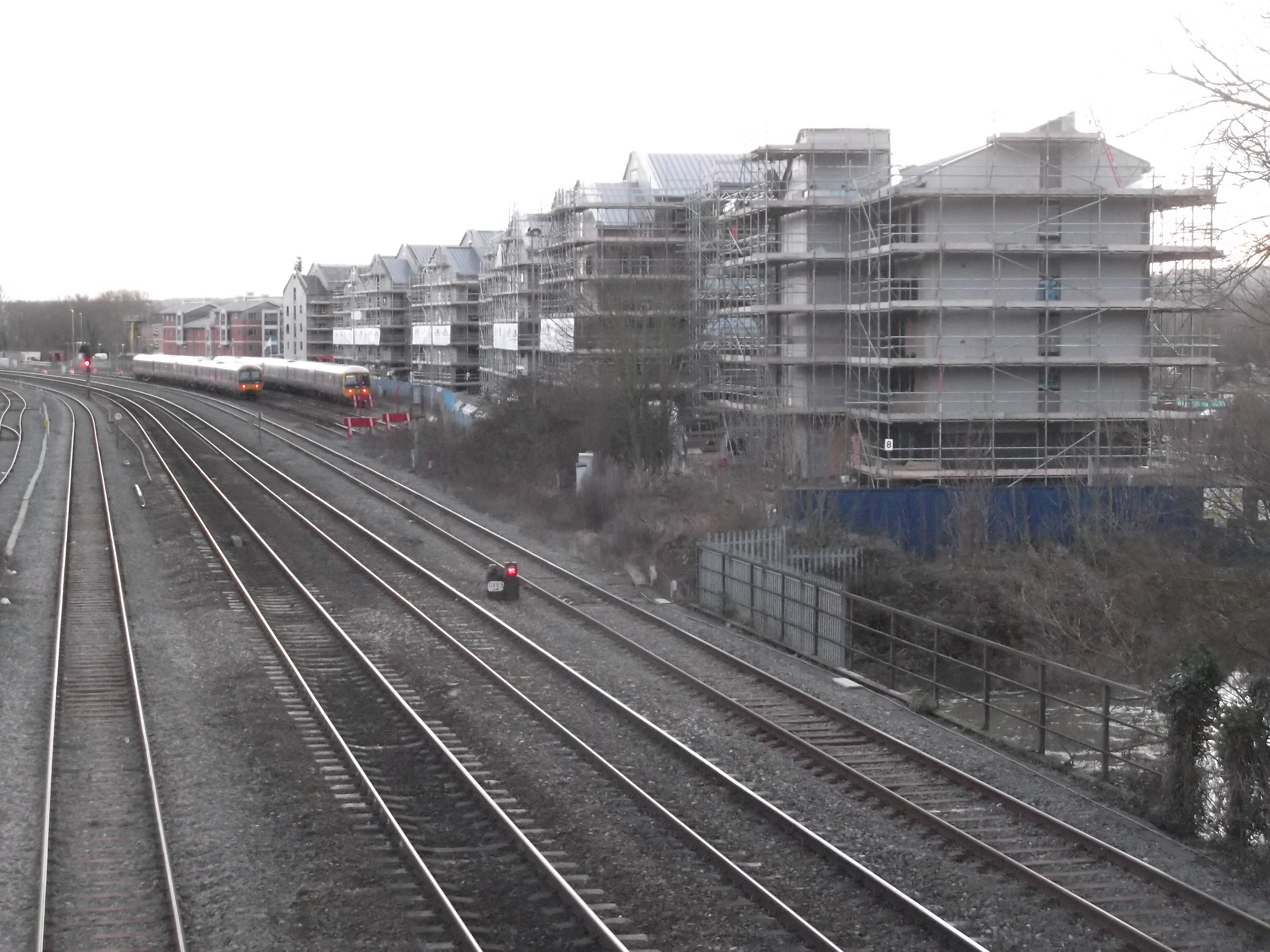
Castle Mill Oxford University graduate housing under construction, from the Walton Well Road railway bridge, January 2013.

Castle Mill is a graduate housing complex of the University of Oxford in Oxford, England.

== Overview ==
Castle Mill is located north of Oxford railway station along Roger Dudman Way, just to the west of the railway tracks and the Oxford Down Carriage Sidings, on what was formerly Cripley Meadow, south of Port Meadow. The initial buildings at the southern end of the site were completed in 2004. Accommodation is available for single people, couples, and families. Graduate students with children benefit from priority access to lower-cost accommodation, alleviating the over-stretched housing market in Central Oxford.

Facilities at Castle Mill include a common room, launderettes, bicycle racks and an outside barbecue area. The complex is supported by caretakers who live on site. The proximity of the railway causes a noise issue.

The Castle Mill Stream, a branch of the River Thames, runs to the east of the site beyond the railway tracks, hence the name. From Castle Mill there are views of the railway lines to the East, and allotments and Port Meadow to the West.

== Development and controversy ==
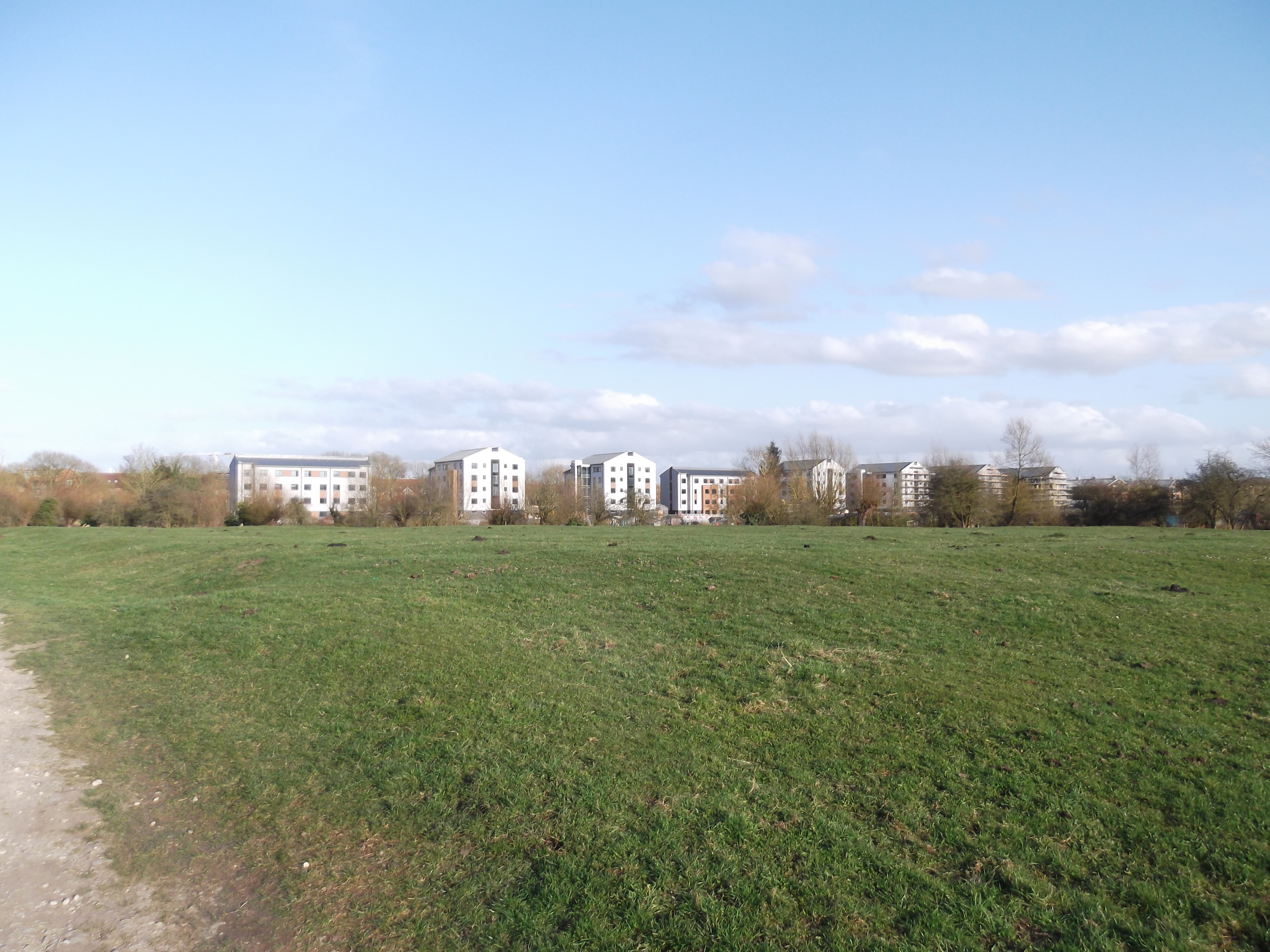
View from Port Meadow.

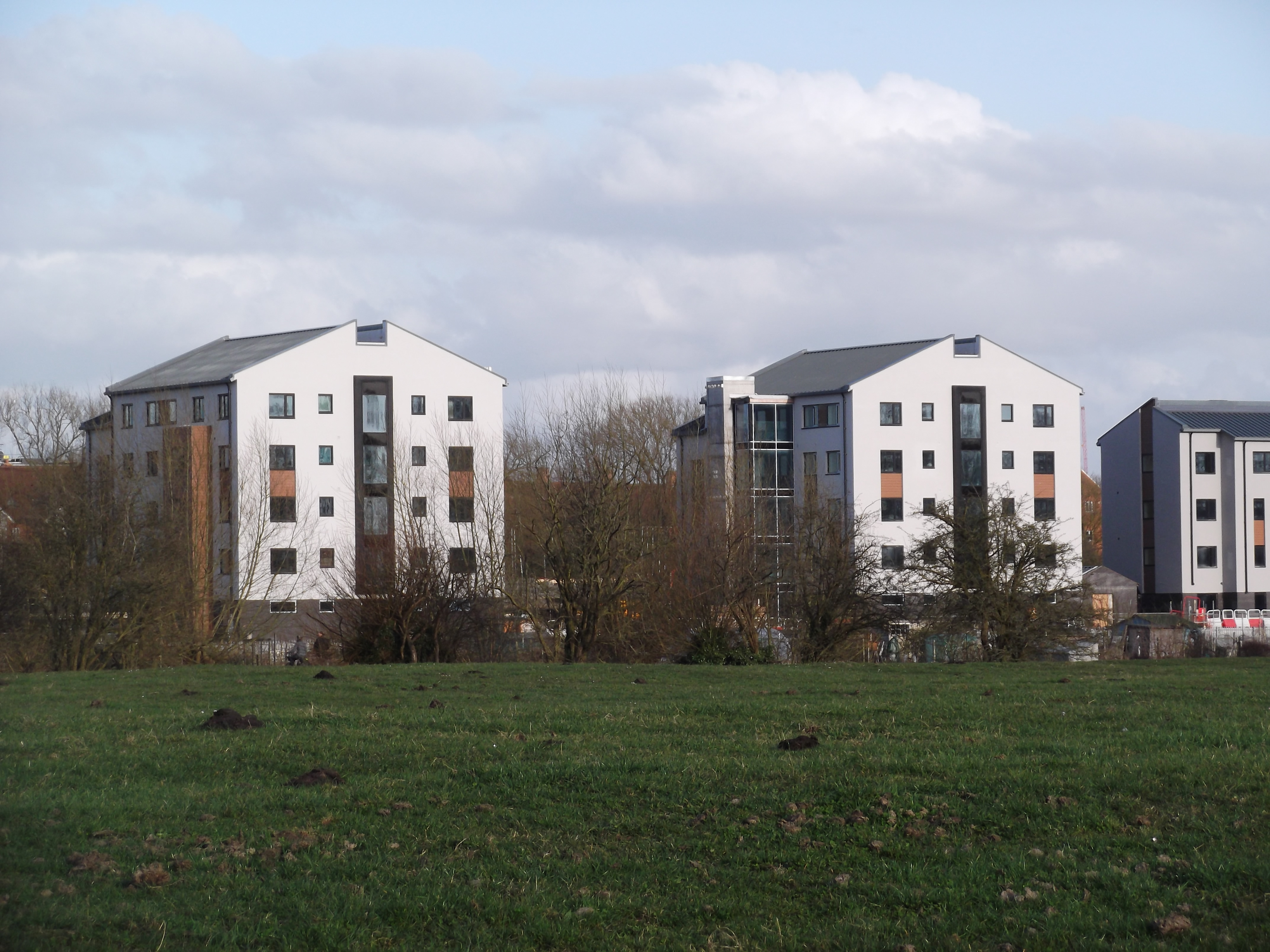
Close-up of 5-storey blocks from Port Meadow, showing the reduced-height apex in the roof line, undertaken to make the buildings more acceptable with respect to blocking the view.

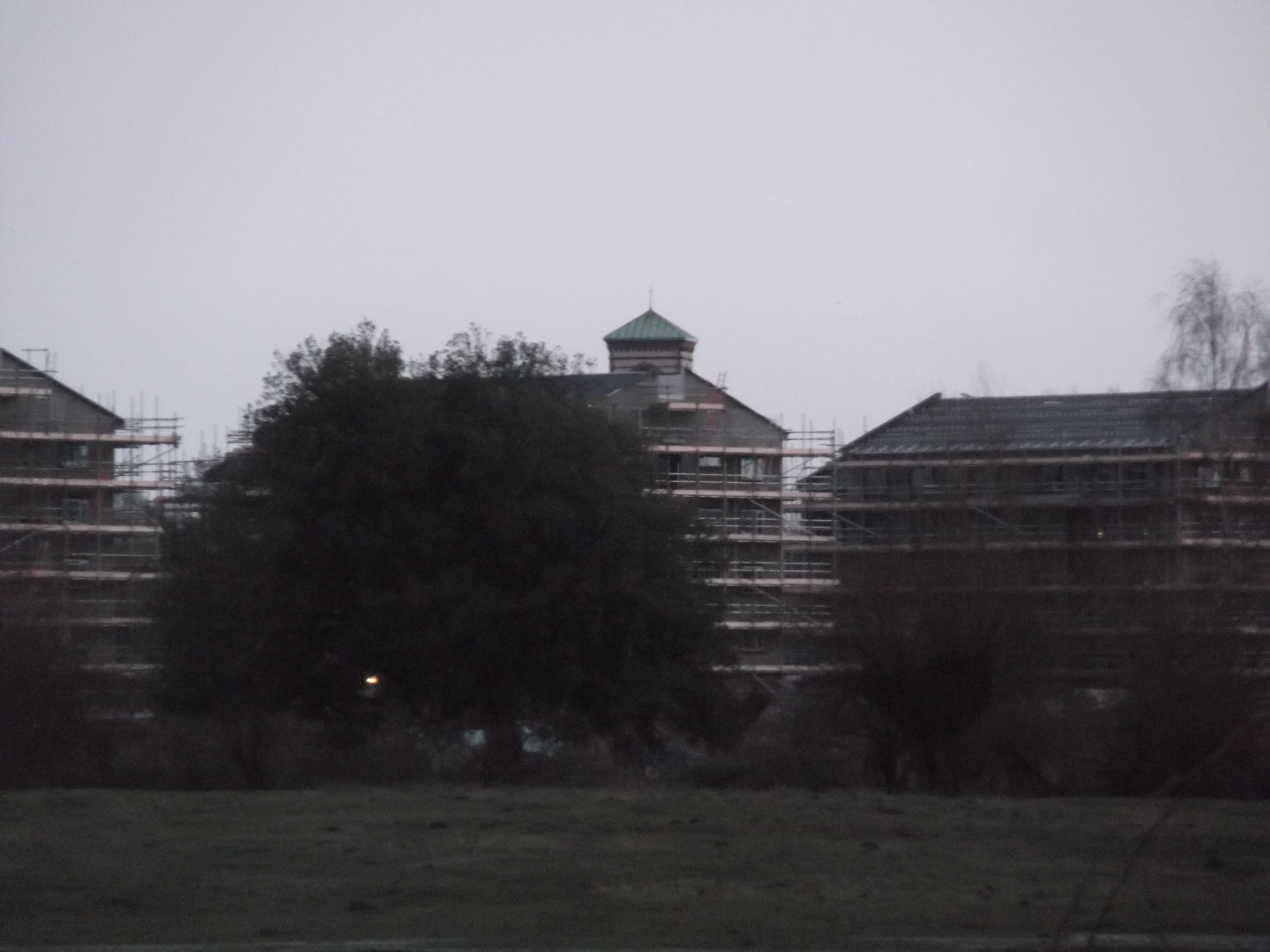
St Barnabas Church campanile obscured by new Oxford University Castle Mill graduate accommodation buildings, at the southern end of Port Meadow.

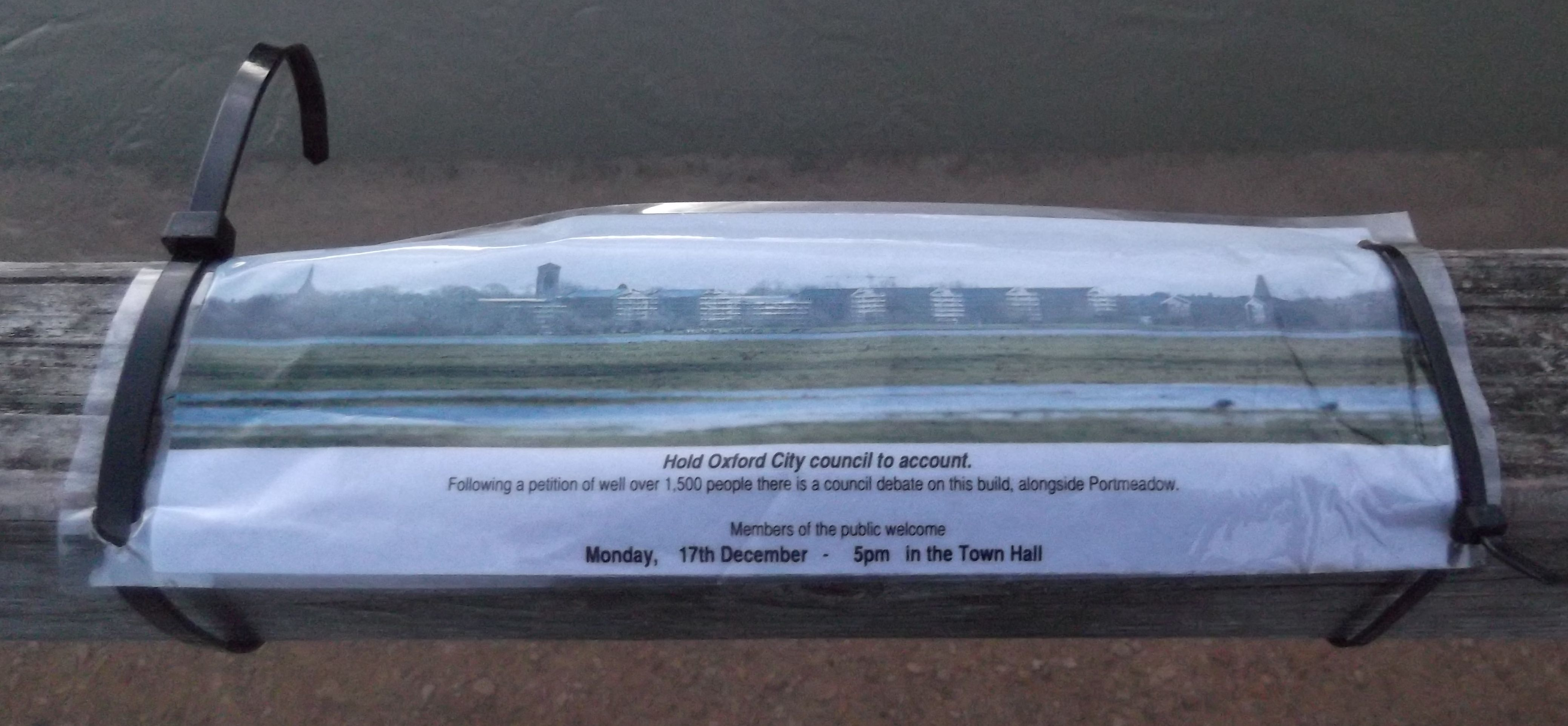
Notice about the Castle Mill graduate housing on the bridge between Port Meadow and Fiddler's Island, December 2012.

In 2010, Oxford City Council capped the number of students that Oxford University and Oxford Brookes University were permitted to have in private rented housing to 3,000 each. The Council was encouraged by local lobbies such as the East Oxford Residents Forum to use planning permission as an enforcement mechanism. If either University breached the cap, the Council threatened to prevent new buildings from being occupied. As a consequence of these restrictions, the Universities looked to develop sites for student accommodation in partnership with commercial providers.

Since 2012, the Oxford University Estates Directorate, with the help of Longcross, have been developing the 2½ acres (one hectare) Castle Mill brown field site, north of the existing accommodation, between the Cripley Meadow Allotments and the railway tracks, close to the southern end of Port Meadow, to meet the need for graduate places.

The development has been controversial, since the four to five storey blocks overlook Port Meadow, an historic open area to the north with views of some of Oxford's skyline. Campaigners warned of damage to views of Oxford. There was an online petition and a "Save Port Meadow" campaign was established in December 2012. Concern was raised by the Oxford Preservation Trust, Layla Moran MP, the Liberal Democrats, and Green Party. Some members of Oxford University expressed anger. The development has been likened by a critic to building a "skyscraper beside Stonehenge".

In February 2013, a local newspaper reported that Oxford City Council had entered negotiations with Oxford University to reduce the height of the buildings by two storeys. There was a protest and picket of Congregation, the University's formal assembly of senior members, at the Sheldonian Theatre in central Oxford. The protesters including members of the University, such as Diarmaid MacCulloch, Professor of the History of the Church and TV historian. Oxford University donors, such as Michael Moritz, and the University's Vice-Chancellor, Prof. Andrew Hamilton, were also targeted with letters by the protesters, warning that the buildings "blot out the unique view of Oxford's Dreaming Spires from Port Meadow". Campaigners claimed that the decision on the development was unlawful. The author Philip Pullman condemned the buildings; this was featured in the national press.

In particular, views of the Grade I listed Italianate St Barnabas Church in Jericho have been affected. An internal report of 24 January 2012 at Oxford City Council stated "Photomontages show that from some parts of the meadow the view of the St Barnabas campanile will be obscured with the long unrelieved roof line cutting across in front of it." (See photograph to the right.)

In March 2013, it was revealed that Oxford City Council was warned about the threat to the views from Port Meadow. The Head of Heritage at the Council reported on "the harmful impact", concluding that "There is no justification for this harm". The University submitted revised plans reducing the height of the blocks by 4' (1.2 metres) on 9 February 2012, yet the planning officer's report recommending approval of the revised scheme was dated 3 February 2012. The height change is seen by some as having a negligible effect in practice. The Vice-Chairman of the West Area Planning Committee said "I was told there had been no objections to the original scheme and as the revised scheme was designed to make it even less controversial there was no need to consult."

In April 2013, it was reported that Oxford University had removed the topmost apex of the roof in its revised plans, rather than removing a storey. The University stated that it would not reduce the height of the buildings voluntarily and had estimated the cost of doing so as £10–20 million. On 17 April, masked protesters attended an Oxford City Council meeting, where it was decided that a high-level meeting between the University's Vice-Chancellor and the Council leader was needed. The City Council warned the University that compulsory measures could be taken to reduce the impact of Castle Mill. Campaigners set up a fund to oppose the development in the High Court. The Director of the Oxford Preservation Trust has said, "I don't think we have the guidelines in place which allow for a development like the one near Port Meadow to be properly assessed."

During May 2013, it emerged that pollution at Castle Mill had not been checked before work began, as was required in the planning permission. The CPRE stated that a request under the Freedom of Information Act revealed that the University did not provide the necessary information before work started in September 2012. When the University did eventually undertake the assessment, it was deemed adequate by the City Council officers, but a judgement of the matter by the Council itself was postponed. Later in May, a University alumnus said that he had been lobbied by the Provost of Worcester College, Professor Jonathan Bate, because the College was objecting to a modest planning proposal by Exeter College.

In June 2013, Castle Mill was one of six buildings nominated for the 2013 Carbuncle Cup, an annual award by Building Design for "the ugliest building in the United Kingdom completed in the last 12 months. It is described as "a deeply unimaginative and impoverished design which would lower the spirits whatever its setting, but on the edge of one of central England's most important and ancient landscapes, it is an outrage."

In July 2013, an independent inquiry into the student blocks and how the University was allowed to obscure historic views of Oxford was announced. The level of consultation and the relationship between Oxford city planners and Oxford University have been questioned. There have been claims that city councillors were misled about the impact of the scheme.

Two years on, the controversy continued, with several Oxford academics still in public opposition. October 2014 was the second anniversary of the issue, still raising anger from local campaigners, with a retrospective environmental impact assessment in progress.

In February 2015, almost exactly three years after Oxford City Council approved the scheme, academics and staff who are members of the university's Congregation – effectively its parliament – debated a binding motion to reduce the height of six of Castle Mill's eight blocks to reduce the development's visual impact. The proposal was defeated by 536 votes to 210. The University's Student Union campaigned against the motion on the grounds that it would have an adverse impact on graduate student housing and finance. A subsequent postal vote, triggered by critics of Castle Mill, rejected the proposal to reduce the height of six blocks by 1,698 to 460. In response to the two votes, Oxford University stated that it would pursue its favoured option, screening the student flats with trees and new cladding at an approximate cost of £6m. The plans were approved by Oxford City Council in 2017.

As of 2020, changes have been made including painting with a less bright shade and installation of some green walls.
