= Pont-Hébert =

- Commune
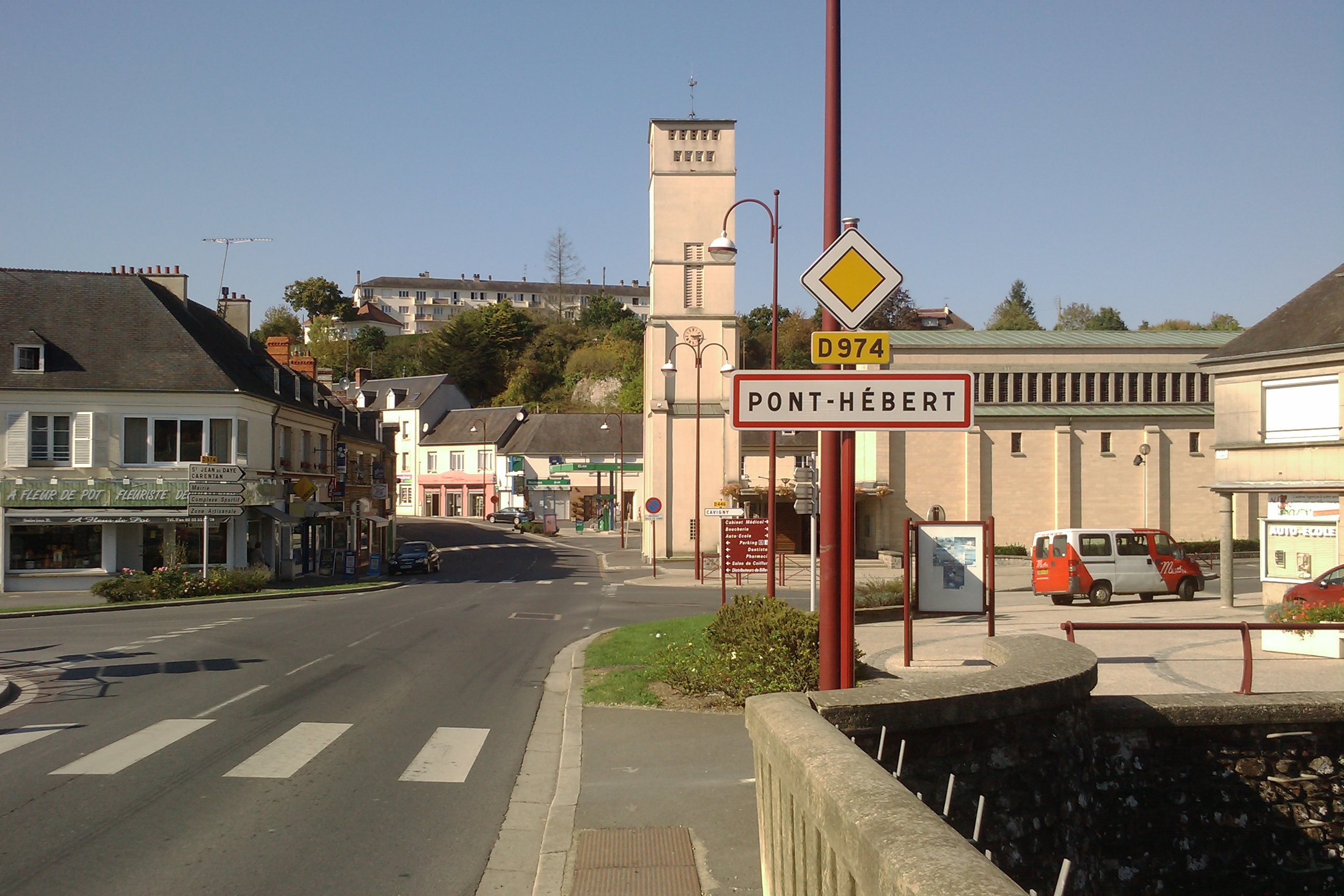
- Pont-Hébert viewed from the bridge over the Vire
- Location of Pont-Hébert
- Location within France Location within Normandy
- Coordinates: 49°10′04″N 1°07′55″W
- Country: France
- Region: Normandy
- Department: Manche
- Arrondissement: Saint-Lô
- Canton: Pont-Hébert
- Intercommunality: Saint-Lô Agglo

Government
  - Mayor (2020–2026): Michel Richomme
- Area^{1}: 29.84 km^{2} (11.52 sq mi)
- Elevation: 49 m (161 ft)
- Highest elevation: 83 m (272 ft)
- Lowest elevation: 5 m (16 ft)
- Population (2023): 1,897
  - Density: 63.57/km^{2} (164.7/sq mi)
- Time zone: UTC+01:00 (CET)
  - Summer (DST): UTC+02:00 (CEST)
- INSEE/Postal code: 50409 /50880
- ^{1} French Land Register data, which excludes lakes, ponds, glaciers > 1 km^{2} (0.386 sq mi or 247 acres) and river estuaries.

Pont-Hébert (French pronunciation: [pɔ̃ ebɛʁ]) is a commune in the Manche department in Normandy in north-western France. On 1 January 2018, the former commune of Le Hommet-d'Arthenay was merged into Pont-Hébert.

== Geography ==
=== Climate ===
Pont-Hébert has an oceanic climate (Köppen climate classification Cfb). The average annual temperature in Pont-Hébert is 11.6 °C (52.9 °F). The average annual rainfall is 972.3 mm (38.28 in) with December as the wettest month. The temperatures are highest on average in August, at around 17.9 °C (64.2 °F), and lowest in January, at around 5.7 °C (42.3 °F). The highest temperature ever recorded in Pont-Hébert was 37.8 °C (100.0 °F) on 5 August 2003; the coldest temperature ever recorded was −13.5 °C (7.7 °F) on 2 January 1997.

Climate data for Pont-Hébert (1981–2010 averages, extremes 1996−2010)
Month	Jan	Feb	Mar	Apr	May	Jun	Jul	Aug	Sep	Oct	Nov	Dec	Year
Record high °C (°F)	15.3 (59.5)	19.0 (66.2)	22.3 (72.1)	24.5 (76.1)	30.3 (86.5)	33.5 (92.3)	32.8 (91.0)	37.8 (100.0)	32.1 (89.8)	24.8 (76.6)	19.0 (66.2)	16.2 (61.2)	37.8 (100.0)
Mean daily maximum °C (°F)	8.3 (46.9)	9.5 (49.1)	11.7 (53.1)	14.0 (57.2)	17.4 (63.3)	20.4 (68.7)	21.9 (71.4)	22.5 (72.5)	20.2 (68.4)	16.2 (61.2)	11.9 (53.4)	8.8 (47.8)	15.3 (59.5)
Daily mean °C (°F)	5.7 (42.3)	6.5 (43.7)	8.1 (46.6)	10.0 (50.0)	13.3 (55.9)	16.0 (60.8)	17.5 (63.5)	17.9 (64.2)	15.9 (60.6)	12.8 (55.0)	9.0 (48.2)	6.0 (42.8)	11.6 (52.9)
Mean daily minimum °C (°F)	3.1 (37.6)	3.5 (38.3)	4.5 (40.1)	6.0 (42.8)	9.2 (48.6)	11.5 (52.7)	13.1 (55.6)	13.3 (55.9)	11.5 (52.7)	9.4 (48.9)	6.2 (43.2)	3.3 (37.9)	7.9 (46.2)
Record low °C (°F)	−13.5 (7.7)	−8.0 (17.6)	−5.0 (23.0)	−1.7 (28.9)	1.3 (34.3)	4.2 (39.6)	7.5 (45.5)	6.7 (44.1)	4.4 (39.9)	−3.9 (25.0)	−4.2 (24.4)	−7.5 (18.5)	−13.5 (7.7)
Average precipitation mm (inches)	92.9 (3.66)	74.3 (2.93)	74.7 (2.94)	68.8 (2.71)	79.9 (3.15)	54.0 (2.13)	63.7 (2.51)	73.6 (2.90)	71.6 (2.82)	102.9 (4.05)	105.9 (4.17)	110.0 (4.33)	972.3 (38.28)
Average precipitation days (≥ 1.0 mm)	14.4	12.3	12.9	12.1	10.3	9.4	11.4	9.4	9.6	14.5	16.0	15.8	147.9
Source: Meteociel

== See also ==
- Communes of the Manche department
