= Robert Curthose =

Duke of Normandy from 1087 to 1106

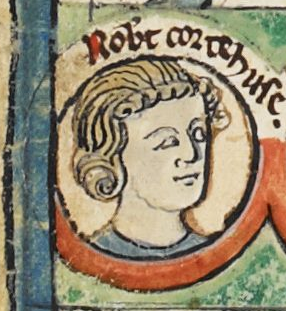
- Robert Curthose in a medieval manuscript, c. 1300–1340

Duke of Normandy
- Tenure: 9 September 1087 – 1106
- Predecessor: William the Conqueror
- Successor: Henry I or William Clito (disputed)
- Born: c. 1051; Duchy of Normandy
- Died: c. 3 February 1134 (aged ~83); Cardiff Castle, Glamorgan
- Burial: Gloucester Cathedral, Gloucestershire
- Spouse: Sybilla of Conversano (m. 1100; died 1103)
- Issue: William Clito
- House: Normandy
- Father: William the Conqueror
- Mother: Matilda of Flanders

Robert Curthose (French: Robert Courteheuse; c. 1051 – c. 3 February 1134) was the eldest son of William the Conqueror and was Duke of Normandy as Robert II from 1087 to 1106.

Robert was twice an unsuccessful pretender to the throne of the Kingdom of England. The epithet "Curthose" originated in the Norman French word courtheuse ("short stockings"). The chroniclers William of Malmesbury and Orderic Vitalis wrote that his father had derisively called him brevis-ocrea ("short boot").

Robert's reign is noted for the discord with his brothers, the English kings William II and Henry I. He mortgaged his duchy to finance his participation in the First Crusade, where he was an important commander. In 1106, his disagreements with Henry led to defeat in the Battle of Tinchebray and lifelong captivity, with Normandy temporarily absorbed into England's possession.

== Early life ==
Robert was the eldest son of William the Conqueror, the first Norman king of England, and Matilda of Flanders. His birth has been dated to between 1051 and 1053. It has been argued that 1051 is more likely, on the basis of two ducal charters issued at Saint-Wandrille in that year which included a young Robert among the witnesses. On this dating, Robert would have been about sixteen when William associated him with the government of Normandy in 1067, making his early political role less surprising. His birthplace is unknown, though the ducal palace at Rouen has been considered as likely as any other location. As a child he was betrothed to Margaret, the heiress of Maine, but she died before they could wed, and Robert did not marry until his late forties. In his youth, he was courageous and skillful in military exercises. He was also prone to laziness and weakness of character that discontented nobles and the King of France exploited to stir discord with his father. He was unsatisfied with the share of power allotted to him and quarrelled with his father and brothers fiercely. In 1063, his father made him the Count of Maine in view of his engagement to Margaret, and Robert may have ruled independently in Maine.

The county remained under Norman control until 1069, when the county revolted and reverted to Hugh V, Count of Maine.

In 1077, Robert instigated his first insurrection against his father as the result of a prank played by his younger brothers William Rufus and Henry, who had dumped a full chamber pot over his head. Robert was enraged and, urged on by his companions, started a brawl with his brothers that was only interrupted by the intercession of their father. Feeling that his dignity was wounded, Robert was further angered when King William failed to punish his brothers. The next day Robert and his followers attempted to seize Rouen Castle. The siege failed, but, when King William ordered their arrest, Robert and his companions took refuge with Hugh of Chateauneuf-en-Thymerais. They were forced to flee again when King William attacked their base at Rémalard.

== Exile ==
Robert fled to Flanders to the court of his uncle Robert I, Count of Flanders before plundering the county of the Vexin and causing such mayhem that his father, King William, allied himself with King Philip I of France to stop his rebellious son. Relations were not helped when King William discovered that his wife, Robert's mother Queen Matilda, was secretly sending him money. At a battle in January 1079, Robert is said to have unhorsed King William in combat and succeeded in wounding him, only stopping his attack when he recognised his father's voice. Humiliated, King William cursed his son. King William then raised the siege and returned to Rouen.

At Easter 1080, father and son were reunited by the efforts of Queen Matilda, and a truce between the two lasted until she died in 1083. Robert seems to have left court soon after the death of his mother and spent several years travelling throughout France, Germany, and Flanders. He visited Italy seeking the hand of the great heiress Matilda of Tuscany (b. 1046) but was unsuccessful. During this period as a wandering knight Robert sired several illegitimate children. His son Richard seems to have spent much of his life at the royal court of his uncle William Rufus. This Richard was killed in a hunting accident in the New Forest in 1100, as was his uncle, King William Rufus, the same year. An illegitimate daughter was later married to Helias of Saint-Saens.

== First reign (1087–1096) ==
=== Succession crisis ===
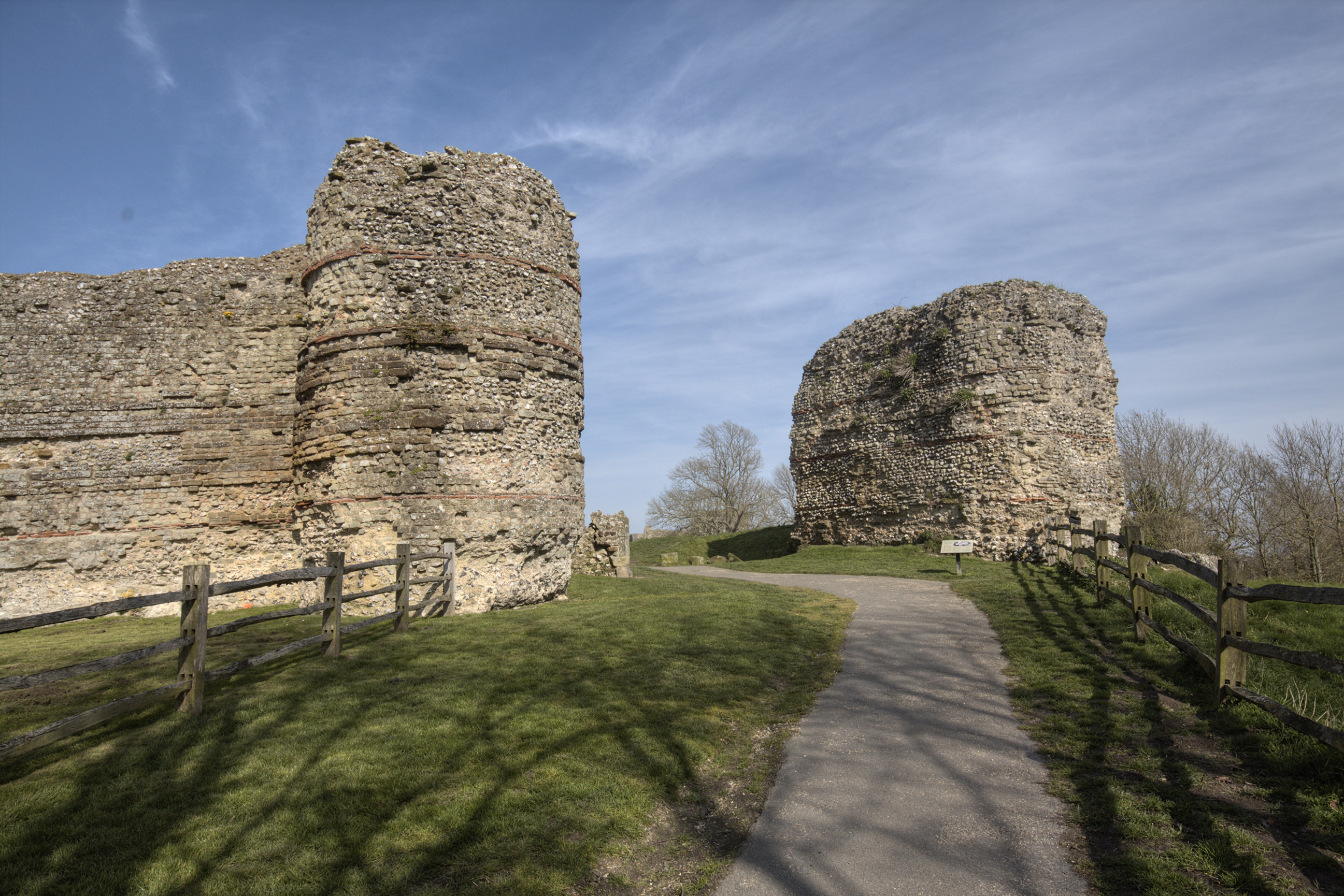
Roman west gate of Pevensey Castle; the main land entrance

In 1087, the elder William died of wounds suffered from a riding accident during a siege of Mantes. At his death he reportedly wanted to disinherit his eldest son but was persuaded to instead divide the Norman dominions between his two eldest sons. To Robert he granted the Duchy of Normandy and to William Rufus he granted the Kingdom of England. The youngest son, Henry, was given money to buy land. Of the two elder sons Robert was considered to be much weaker and was generally preferred by the nobles who held lands on both sides of the English Channel since they could more easily circumvent his authority.

This agreement lasted less than a year, when barons joined with Robert to displace Rufus in the Rebellion of 1088, beginning in the spring of that year. Although Robert initially accepted Rufus's claim in England, when given the opportunity by the leader of the conspiracy and his probable chief advisor, Odo, Bishop of Bayeux, he began preparations. For this, Robert lacked sufficient funds, and approached his younger brother Henry for part of the money he had received in the inheritance. Henry refused, but Robert promptly offered the whole of the Cotentin, as well as Avranches and Mont-Saint-Michel, in exchange for 3000 livres. Henry agreed.

Meanwhile, William found out about his barons' plot to overthrow him, and went to besiege Odo at Rochester. Odo found out, and fled for Pevensey to join the defence. The king followed the bishop towards Pevensey Castle and promptly began a siege there instead, abandoning the proposed action against Rochester. Although Robert did not himself join his allies in England, he sent a contingent of soldiers towards England so as to support them as he continued preparations, probably delayed by the need to control the channel. William sent his own fleet to contest the Norman landing as he invested Pevensey, at which point the English navy won a decisive victory. Robert's fleet had cost 3000 livres; all of the money gained from selling the Cotentin was now gone. After six weeks, Pevensey fell and Odo was captured, with William then having to besiege Rochester defended by multiple great Norman magnates, such as Robert of Belleme amongst the leaders.

With still no aid from Robert, whose resources were now limited, the defenders were forced to surrender. Bishop Odo was exiled and lost all of his lands within England, alongside other conspirators, and Robert lost any opportunity he had to seize England for the next 12 years. Not all of the barons who participated in the revolt were punished so severely; many, such as Roger Bigod and the Grandmesnils, reconciled with Rufus and came to oppose Robert. The revolt failed in part because Robert never showed up to support the English rebels, leaving only the controversial Odo of Bayeux to lead the barons.

=== Rule in Normandy ===
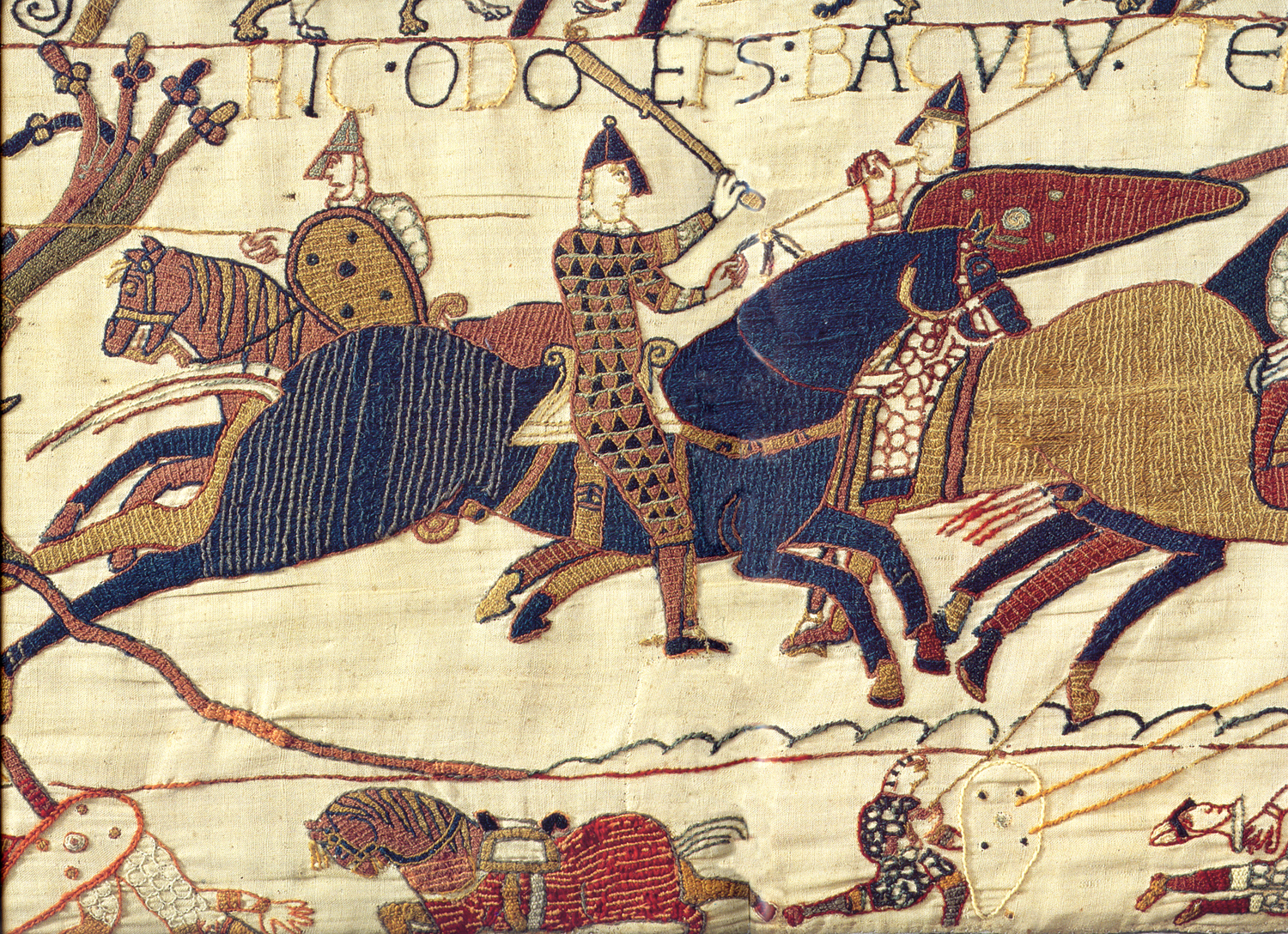
Detail from the Bayeux Tapestry showing one of Robert's most important advisors, Bishop Odo (wielding club at centre)

The central authority of the Duke of Normandy weakened in the midst of William I's death, though not to a terminal extent. Local magnates including Ralph of Conches and Robert of Bellême expelled the garrisons of the late king and established areas of dominion. Robert was affable, mild, and generous to his barons and the clergy. In 1088 alone, Robert endowed the Abbey of Saint-Étienne and Fécamp Abbey. However, this, alongside the sudden weakness of ducal authority, and other expenditures, left Robert almost perpetually lacking in funds. Enemies of Henry at Robert's court had convinced the duke to arrest his younger brother and Robert of Bellême, on suspicion of reconciling with Rufus. Henry had, in fact, travelled across the channel to request the estates of the late Matilda of Flanders, which Rufus refused to surrender. Henry was released after six months.

On the advice of Odo of Bayeux, Duke Robert quickly assembled an army in August of 1088 with which he marched to Le Mans and was welcomed by the citizens, with the purpose of securing his control over the southern frontier castles of the duchy. This army secured the castles of Saint-Céneri and Ballon, both formerly in revolt against Robert. The duke had Robert Quarrel, the lord of Ballon, blinded, and mutilated his enemies within Saint-Céneri. Robert of Bellême was imprisoned by the duke, and only freed due to the intervention of Roger of Montgomery, his father. Roger requested peace, and successfully petitioned for his son to be released. The duke may have been motivated by Robert's prior dogged support for the invasion of England.

=== Instability and defections ===
By 1089, Duke Robert faced another threat in the form of Rufus's wish to destabilize Normandy. In contrast to his elder brother, the English king possessed deep pockets and more expansive methods of raising wealth, with a large treasury available at Winchester. William bribed many of Robert's vassals away from him, starting with the garrison of Saint-Valery. Stephen of Aumale, Gerard of Gournay, Robert of Eu, Walter Giffard, and Ralph Mortemer were all coaxed towards William's side, leaving most of the Norman barons on the right bank of the Seine ready to break away from the duke.

Lacking the same financial resources or ability to deliver reward, Robert was in a sense helpless against this change, but Helias of Saint-Saëns, the Lord of Saint-Saëns, stood firm in the duke's camp. Helias was, for his loyalty, given the hand of an illegitimate daughter of Robert's alongside the castles of Arques and Bures, making him one of the only counterbalances to William's intercessions in the region. The duke managed to form an alliance with Philip, King of France against the magnates East of the Seine, and they launched a siege of Gerard of Gournay's castle at La Ferté-Bernard. In exchange, Robert granted Philip the castle of Gisors, along the Epte, which marked the border of the Vexin. The castle had belonged to the Cathedral of Rouen and this grant angered Archbishop William. Robert besieged and captured the castle of Eu, and Aird considers him to have had a successful campaign against the rebels by September of 1089.

A revolt broke out in Maine when the Manceau heard of Robert's illness in late 1089. Preoccupied with the barons east of the Seine, Robert met with Fulk IV, Count of Anjou, and requested that he resolve the crisis. Fulk agreed if he was allowed to marry the daughter of Simon de Montfort, Bertrade, despite having been married thrice. Bertrade was in the care of her uncle, William of Évreux, and to secure the marriage, Robert had to grant William the lands of Ralph Asshead, and grant a series of castles to his nephew, William of Breteuil. Fulk successfully suppressed the revolt in Maine for a year.

In November 1090, a revolt broke out in Rouen led by the Pilatenses, a faction of the city opposed to Robert's rule and led by Conan, the son of Gilbert Pilatus. As supposedly the wealthiest citizen of Rouen, Conan was supported by William Rufus in his revolt, and Robert had to hastily summon his vassals to assist him in crushing the riot. Henry, Robert's brother, was convinced to forget the duke's prior wrongs against him and come to his aid. Though he led his men bravely, Duke Robert's vassals convinced him to flee the city for his own safety, while Henry and Gilbert of L'Aigle crushed the revolt and captured many of its leaders. Conan was personally executed by Henry.

But Robert's success here did not prevent failures elsewhere. In the same month, a private war broke out between Ralph of Conches and William of Évreux, and Ralph appealed to the duke for aid. Robert, under significant pressure, was not forthcoming, and Ralph then requested support from William of England. William quickly directed his satellites in Normandy to support Ralph, thus expanding the king's influence in the duchy. At the same time, in Maine, the Norman garrisons were expunged and Maine was claimed by Hugh of Este, a relative of Hugh IV. Only Hoël, Bishop of Le Mans stayed loyal to Robert and his resistance saw support for Hugh ultimately deteriorate. Hugh would ultimately sell the comital title to Helias of La Flèche.

=== Cooperation and renewed conflict ===
In early 1091, either January or February, King William launched an invasion of Normandy with a large fleet, establishing his base at Eu. Robert's barons abandoned him against Rufus, retreating to their castles. Robert ultimately required the aid of Philip of France once again, and the two marched against the city of Eu. However, before major fighting could begin, negotiations instead took place at Rouen. Robert surrendered the Abbey of Fécamp, the counties of Eu and Aumale, the territories of Gerard of Gournay and Ralph of Conches, and the castles of Cherbourg and Mont-Saint-Michel. All the barons who had been punished by either brother were to receive amnesty and their estates back.

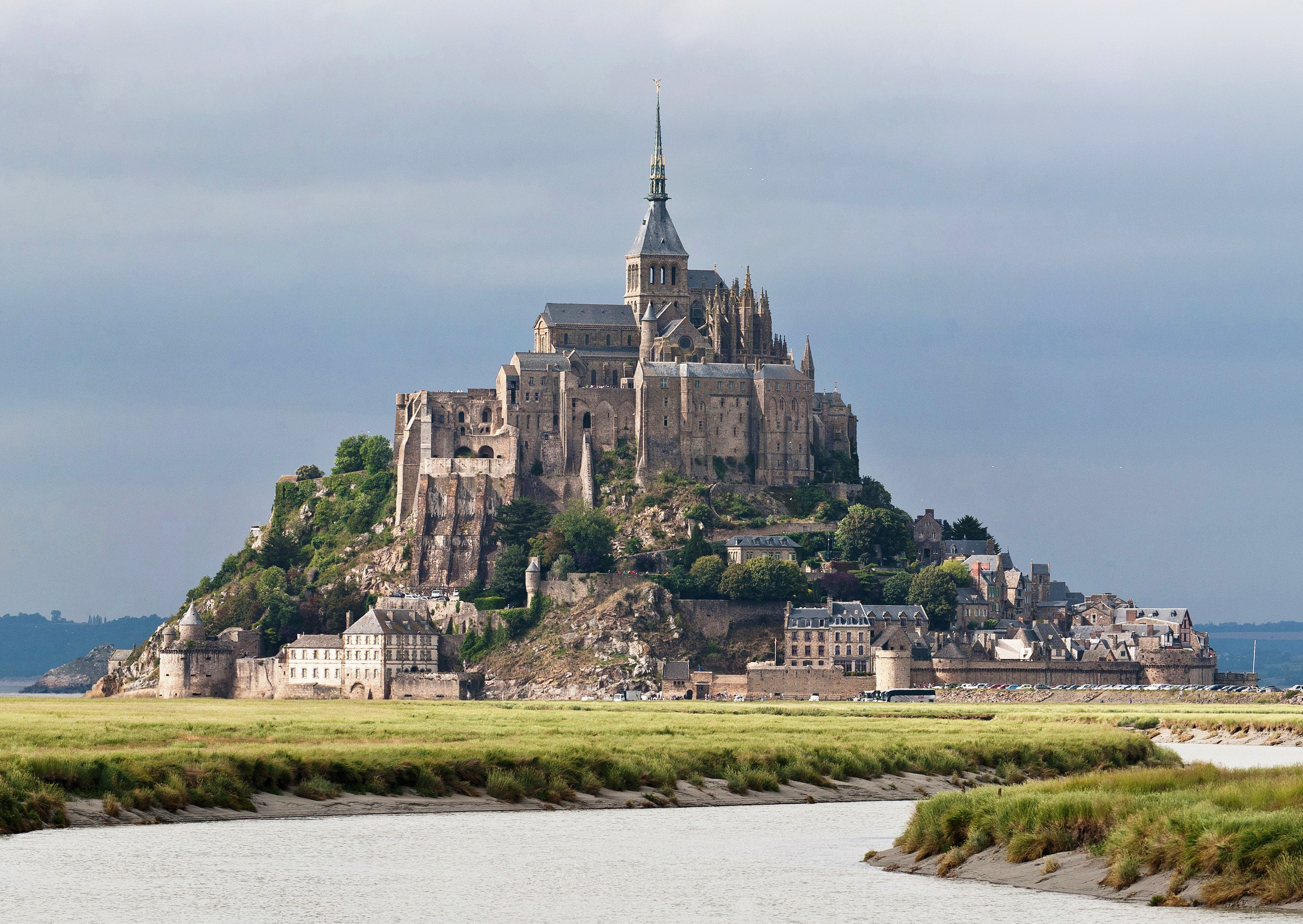
Mont Saint-Michel in Normandy, site of the 1091 siege

This was threatening for Henry, who still ruled in the Cotentin. After the riot at Rouen, Henry had been forced from Rouen by the duke and sent home, with their relationship once again on the decline. The prince immediately began preparations for war, but as the armies of Curthose and Rufus invaded, his baronial support network melted away. After the bulk of Henry's capacity for resistance had already been eliminated, he held out at the castle of Mont-Saint-Michel for two weeks, at which point Henry negotiated a surrender.

Meanwhile, the brothers envisaged a stricter enforcement of ducal authority, summoning an assembly on 18 July for that purpose. A few weeks later, either in early August or late July, Robert and William crossed over into England, after helping William assert his lordship over Malcolm, King of Scotland, Robert returned to Normandy in December of 1091. Even after this point, the power of the duke did not stay for long. Henry returned in 1092 and seized Domfront, which he used as a base to begin successfully recovering the Cotentin.

With the short reconciliation between Henry and his brothers over, the alliance between William and Robert came next. William had neglected his promise to aid Robert in 1092 and 1093, to the point that the duke's patience ran out, and in 1093, he ended their alliance. Robert accused Rufus of perjury, provoking the king into launching an invasion around Midlent of 1094. After a failed negotiation, the dispute was put in the hands of the barons, who unilaterally agreed that the origin of the conflict was in Rufus's own failures to honor his agreement. The king did not accept their condemnation, and withdrew from the conference.

After bribing multiple barons to his side, William captured the castle of Bures-en-Bray, held by Helias. But Robert launched a simultaneous campaign of much more success, seizing the significant castles of Argentan and Le Homme, each with large garrisons, alongside his overlord Philip of France, and capturing William Peverel. William retreated to England to raise greater forces, and successfully bribed Philip to abandon his Norman ally, but Robert maintained his campaign without French aid. When the king summoned Prince Henry to his side, Henry was unable to make it past Robert's forces. William sent ships to retrieve Henry with which Henry travelled to England for an audience with the king upon his return. Rufus stayed in Normandy until 29 December, at which point he sailed to Dover, England, with nothing to show for his campaign. William's war against Robert continued into 1095.

== First Crusade (1096–1099) ==
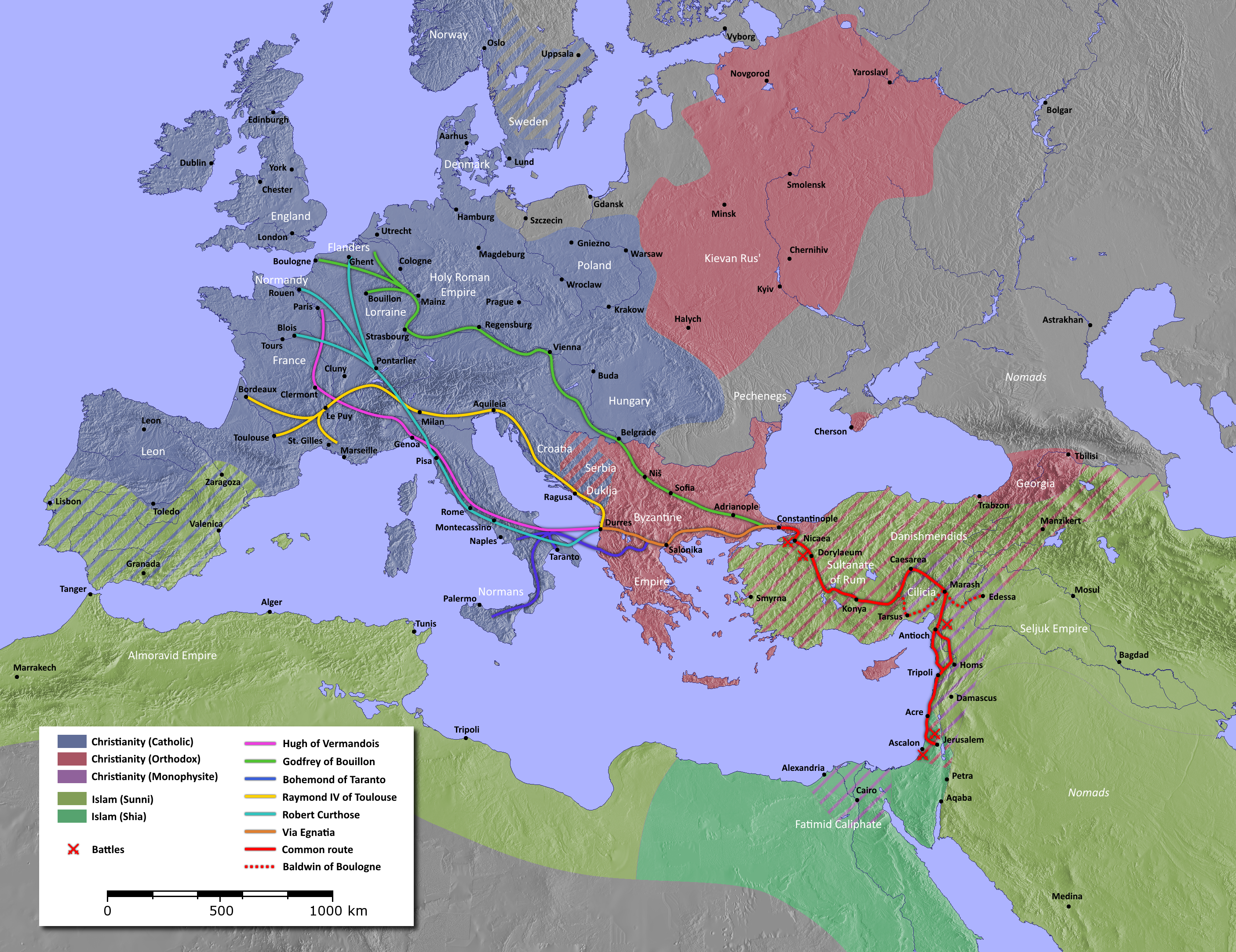
A map of the routes of the major leaders of the First Crusade

In 1096, Robert formed an army and left Normandy to join the First Crusade to aid the Byzantine Empire against the Seljuk Turks and travel to Jerusalem. To raise money for the crusade he mortgaged his duchy to his brother William for the sum of 10,000 marks. Robert joined forces with his cousin, Count Robert II of Flanders, and his brother-in-law, Stephen, Count of Blois; they travelled together to Italy, where they stayed in Norman Apulia during the winter of 1096/97. It is then that he most likely met his future wife, Sybil of Conversano, daughter of Geoffrey, Count of Conversano, a wealthy Italo-Norman lord; according to Orderic he fell in love with her.

Crossing from Brindisi to the city of Dyrrachium in the Byzantine Empire on 5 April 1097, Robert and his army marched along the Via Egnatia and past Ohrid, Thessaloniki and the Aegean coast of Thrace on their way to Constantinople. Robert and Stephen were the last leading nobles to arrive at the gathering point in Constantinople in May of 1097 but were nonetheless welcomed with great respect by Emperor Alexios and memories of Robert's grandfather's visit to Constantinople during his own pilgrimage to Jerusalem were reignited. Both then swore, as had the other crusading leaders except for Raymond IV of Toulouse, an oath to restore all cities that had been in Byzantine possession to Alexios and honour his superior status.

In the first week of June 1097 Robert and Stephen joined the main forces of the crusading army who at this point were besieging Nicaea which was successfully conquered on the 19th of June. At the Battle of Dorylaeum on 1 July, the crusader vanguard led by Robert and Bohemond of Taranto were ambushed and surrounded by the Seljuk Turks. After a heavy cavalry charge failed to disperse them, the Normans formed a defensive circle and held the line for hours in the hot summer sun until the rest of the army arrived, surrounding the Turks and forcing them to flee after inflicting heavy casualties. Robert then participated in the brutal Siege of Antioch and commanded the Normans and English in the first line alongside Robert of Flanders at the subsequent Battle of Antioch in which a huge Muslim relief army was defeated. After months spent languishing at Antioch, Robert joined Raymond of Toulouse and Tancred in pressing on to Jerusalem on 13 January 1099 after the former paid Robert to join him. Together they advanced down the Mediterranean coast and laid siege to Arqa in February but were met with failure and left on 13 May 1099 and went to Jerusalem, finally arriving outside its walls on 7 June. Robert left Raymond's service during the siege on Jerusalem and instead joined Godfrey of Bouillon. As the crusaders lacked the necessary materials, Robert was sent out to gather wood to aid in the construction of siege towers.

He was among the crusaders that captured Jerusalem on 15 July 1099. He also took on a prominent role in the final battle of the crusade at Ascalon on 12 August 1099 as one of the commanders of the crusader centre, personally killing the Egyptian standard-bearer and capturing the tent of the Egyptian commander, Al-Afdal. The fulfilment of his crusader vows was a personal triumph for Robert: he had shown military skills as well as the ability to mediate between different factions in the crusading forces. His conduct on the crusade has been described as the one period of clear distinction in his career, during which he proved himself a brave and spirited participant.

== Second reign (1100–1106) ==
=== Return home ===
Robert left the Holy Land around September 1099 and sailed to Constantinople, where Emperor Alexios showered him with gifts, for he was one of the few crusade leaders to have kept the oath he had made back in 1096, and offered him to enter into the service of the Byzantine Empire, but Robert declined. Instead, he travelled again to Southern Italy where he wintered again and married Sybil which also brought him a big dowry which enabled him to raise the necessary funds to buy back his duchy.

Robert was welcomed warmly in Normandy upon his return, alongside Sibylla. He had granted lands richly upon his return, including granting rights over Argentan, the forest of Gouffern, and the profits over the diocese of Séez to Robert of Bellême. Soon after coming home, he went on a pilgrimage to Mont-Saint-Michel, which stood in effect for his authority in the western parts of the duchy. Orderic claimed that Robert squandered his wealth and became so poor that he had nothing to wear, but this seems unlikely given that Robert would have been reduced to penury so short after his return and might rather refer to his pre-Crusade persona.

=== Crisis of 1101 ===
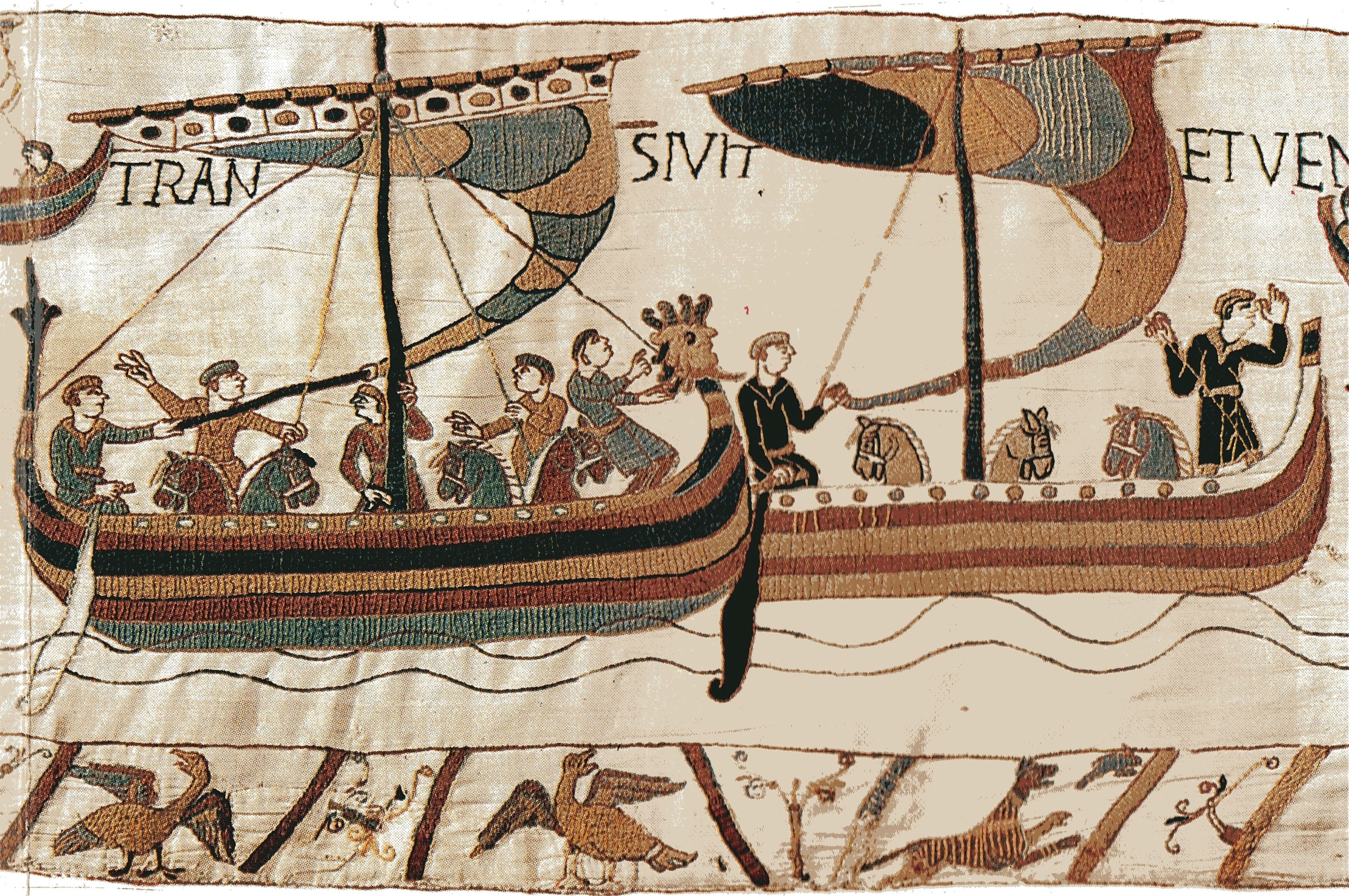
Norman naval forces on the Bayeux Tapestry

When William II died on 2 August 1100, Robert was still on the return journey and absent from Normandy and would not arrive until September, allowing his other brother Henry to seize the crown of England for himself. Robert had a few supporters in England, such as William of Breteuil, but they were overwhelmed by Henry and his allies. Henry also had the benefit of immediacy, as the lengthy interregnum that would be required for Robert to take up the throne could be dangerous to the kingdom. Henry imprisoned Ranulf Flambard, Rufus' unpopular minister, and reconciled with a number of aristocratic parties alienated by the late regime to consolidate his power.

Popular support among the English was in favour of Henry, as Anselm, the archbishop of Canterbury, was decidedly for him and the Charter of Liberties issued at Henry's coronation was well-liked. In February of 1101, Ranulf Flambard escaped from the Tower of London and fled to Normandy. and alongside multiple other Anglo-Norman barons he energetically assisted Robert in an invasion of England.

Robert began preparations and assembled a fleet at Tréport. Ranulf managed to buy off Henry's butsecarls who manned the fleet sent to defeat Robert's invasion, allowing for an uncontested landing in England at Portsmouth. Henry confronted Robert with an army, but after a tense confrontation, Robert and Henry agreed to the Treaty of Alton. Robert released Henry from his 1088 homage and recognized his crown, in exchange for 3000 livres and that Henry surrender all of his landholdings within Normandy, save for Domfront. David argues that Robert never truly had a chance of seizing the English throne after Henry was able to complete his coup.

=== Last years as duke ===
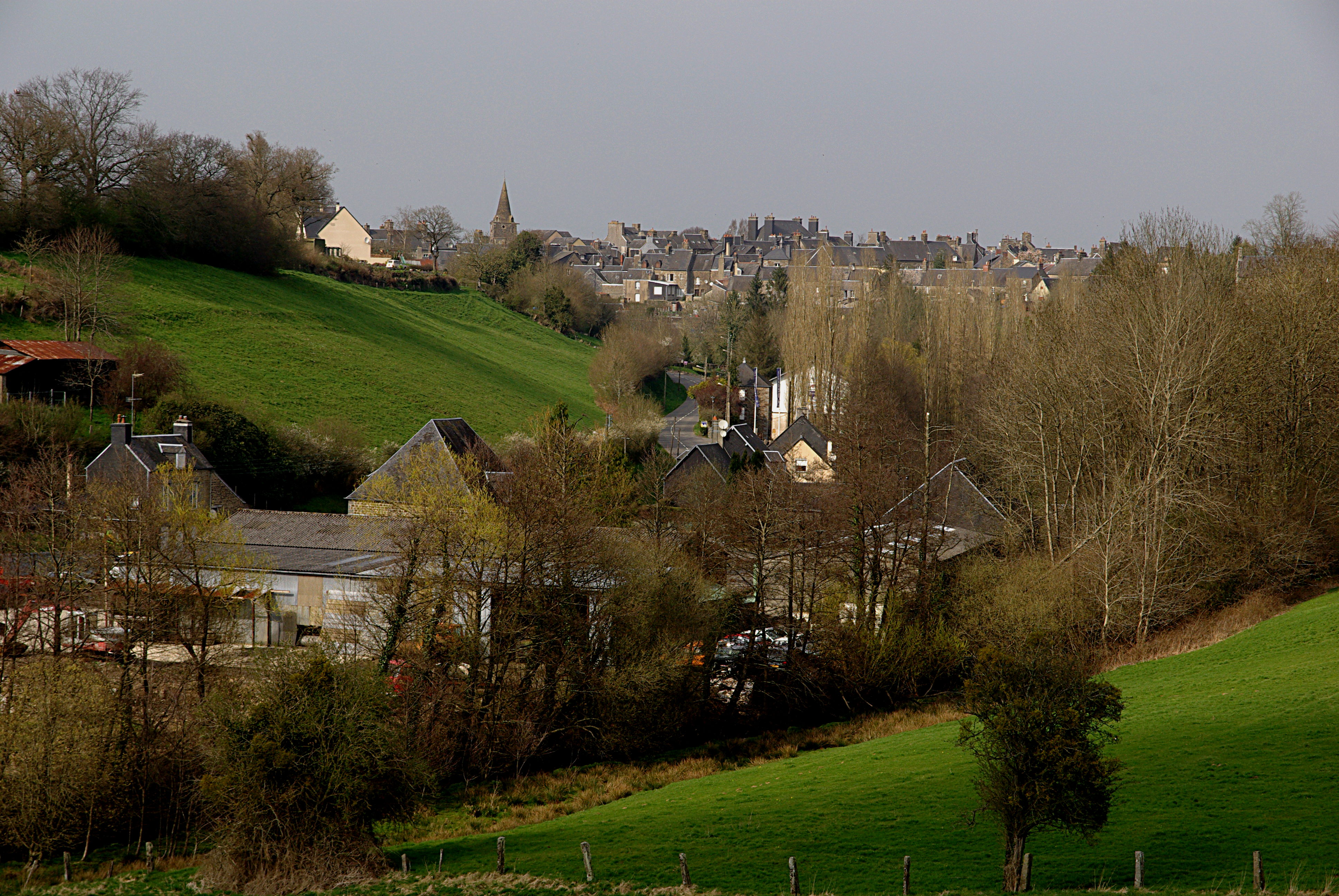
The village of Tinchebray in Normandy in 2008; the site of the Battle of Tinchebray in 1106

After Henry's victory, he took revenge against Robert's supporters, including Ivo de Grandmesnil, Robert Malet, Robert of Pontefract, and most significantly Robert of Bellême, who, after being accused of treason, launched an unsuccessful revolt and was driven from England, fleeing for Normandy. Many of these men, upon making their way to Normandy, attempted to recover their wealth in private wars. Robert had assisted Henry in exiling his opponents by the terms of the treaty, and Bellême, upon making his way to Normandy, waged war against the barons who had joined Duke Robert in doing so. Robert of Bellême became politically isolated, and much of the Norman baronage participated in campaigns against him throughout 1102 and 1103, but these efforts were unsuccessful.

Henry intervened in Norman politics at the death of William of Breteuil, assisting his illegitimate son, Eustace, in seizing his father's domains and giving him in marriage the king's illegitimate daughter, Juliana, which allowed him to claim his father's patrimony. Sibylla died soon after giving birth to Robert's son, William Clito, in 1103. In late 1103, William of Warenne, one of Curthose's supporters, requested that the duke intercede with Henry so that he could regain his earldom of Surrey, lost after the succession crisis of 1101. Robert agreed, and sailed to England with a small host, but was arrested by Henry and made to pay 3000 livres for his freedom. According to Wace, this was when Robert realized his brother hated him.

Orderic reports on an incident at Easter 1105 when Robert was supposed to hear a sermon by the venerable Serlo, Bishop of Sées. Robert spent the night before sporting with harlots and jesters, and while he lay in bed sleeping off his drunkenness his unworthy friends stole his clothes. He awoke to find himself naked and had to remain in bed and missed the sermon. In 1106, Henry defeated Robert's army decisively at the Battle of Tinchebray and claimed Normandy as a possession of the English crown, a situation that endured for almost a century. Captured after the battle, Robert would be briefly imprisoned at Corfe Castle before being transferred to Devizes Castle in Wiltshire for twenty years before being moved to Cardiff. By 1107, Henry had secured control of Normandy.

Robert died in Cardiff Castle, probably on 3 February 1134. He was buried in Gloucester Abbey. The exact place of his burial is difficult to establish—legend states that he requested to be buried before the High Altar. His effigy carved in bog oak adorns a mortuary chest decorated with the attributed arms of the Nine Worthies (missing one—Joshua, and replaced with the arms of Edward the Confessor). The effigy dates from about 100 years after his death and the mortuary chest much later. The church subsequently became Gloucester Cathedral.

== Descendants ==
Robert married Sybilla of Conversano, daughter of Geoffrey of Brindisi, Count of Conversano (and a grandniece of Robert Guiscard, another Norman duke) on the way back from Crusade; they had one child. (Note: "Soon after the birth of her (Sibyl's) only child, William the Clito, she died at Rouen, and was buried, amid universal sorrow, in the cathedral church, Archbishop of William Bonne-Ame performing the obsequies.")

William Clito was born 25 October 1102 and became heir to the Duchy of Normandy. William Clito was unlucky all his life; his attempts to invade Normandy failed twice (1119 and 1125), his first marriage to a daughter of the Count of Anjou was annulled by his uncle's machinations, and even his late inheritance of the county of Flanders was mishandled. William Clito died in 1128 leaving no issue, thus leaving the field clear in the Norman succession (at least until the death of Henry I).

Sybilla, who was admired and often praised by chroniclers of the time, died shortly after the birth of her son. William of Malmesbury says she died as a result of binding her breasts too tightly; both Robert of Torigny and Orderic Vitalis suggest she was murdered by a cabal of noblewomen led by her husband's mistress, Agnes Giffard.

Robert also had at least three illegitimate children: Richard, who died hunting in the New Forest in May 1100; (Note: Like his uncles Richard, who died earlier, and William Rufus, who died later in the same year.) William, a full brother of Richard; and a daughter, who married Helias of Saint-Saëns. William went to the Holy Land after 1106 and was named lord of Tortosa, but disappears from the historical record after 1110.

== Sources ==
=== Sources ===
- Aird, William H. (2008). Robert Curthose, Duke of Normandy c. 1050–1134. Woodbridge, UK: Boydell Press. ISBN 978-1-8438-3660-5.
- Bates, David (2016). William the Conqueror. Yale University Press.
- David, Charles Wendell (1920). Robert Curthose, Duke of Normandy (Reprint of original ed.). Cambridge, MA: Harvard University Press.
- Jessee, W. Scott (2000). Robert the Burgundian and the Counts of Anjou, Ca. 1025–1098. The Catholic University of America Press.
- Lack, Katherine (2007). Conqueror's Son: Duke Robert Curthose, Thwarted King. Sutton Publishing. ISBN 978-0-7509-4566-0.
- Mooers, Stephanie L. (1981). "'Backers and Stabbers': Problems of Loyalty in Robert Curthose's Entourage". Journal of British Studies. 21 (1): 1–17. doi:10.1086/385779. JSTOR 175599.
- Thompson, Kathleen (2002). Power and Border Lordship in Medieval France: The County of the Perche, 1000–1226. The Boydell Press.
- Thompson, Kathleen (2004). "Robert [called Robert Curthose], duke of Normandy (b. in or after 1050, d. 1134)". Oxford Dictionary of National Biography. Oxford University Press. doi:10.1093/ref:odnb/23715. (subscription, Wikipedia Library access or UK public library membership required)
- Vaughn, Sally N. (1994). "Anselm in Italy". Anglo-Norman Studies Proceedings of the Battle Conference. 16: 245–270. ISBN 978-0-8511-5366-7.

Robert Curthose House of Normandy Born: c. 1051 Died: February 1134
Regnal titles
| Preceded by William the Conqueror | Duke of Normandy; 1087–1106 | Succeeded by Henry Beauclerc |
