= Barbara Curthoys =

Australian feminist and communist activist

Barbara Lindsay Curthoys
- Born: Barbara Lindsay McCallum; 21 June 1924; Grafton New South Wales, Australia
- Died: 28 September 2000 (aged 76)
- Relatives: John McCallum (father)
- Military career
- Allegiance: Australia
- Branch: Royal Australian Air Force
- Conflicts: Second World War

Barbara Lindsay Curthoys, née McCallum (21 June 1924 – 28 September 2000) was an Australian feminist and communist activist.

She was born in Grafton to John McCallum, an English and History teacher at Grafton High School and later a Liberal senator, and Eda, née Lockwood who studied to become a special education teacher. In 1930 her mother was diagnosed with Parkinson's disease. In 1932, following her parents' divorce, she moved to Sydney, attending Canterbury Primary School where she was dux and Fort Street Girls' High School. Her marks weren't high enough to win a scholarship to university. She joined the Ashfield branch of the Communist Party of Australia after leaving school, and in 1942 during World War II served in the Women's Auxiliary Australian Air Force as a wireless telegraphist. In 1944 she married Geoff Curthoys, with whom she had two daughters, Ann and Jean. The family moved to Broken Hill in 1946.

In 1953 Curthoys and her family moved to Newcastle, where she became a full-time organiser for the Communist Party. She joined the local branch of the Union of Australian Women in 1954, becoming secretary from 1954 to 1960 and serving on the national body in 1960, 1963 and 1970. She was also secretary of the Newcastle Trades Hall Council Equal Pay and Aboriginal Advancement committees during the 1960s and helped found the Newcastle Peace Forum. She was one of nine NSW Communist Party of Australia candidates for the 1963 Federal Election, standing for the seat of Shortland.

Having returned to academia she graduated with honours in Psychology in 1973, working at Stockton Hospital until 1982. In 1990 she was the first Australian invited to use the recently opened Comintern archives. She and co-author Audrey McDonald wrote book together on the a history of the Union of Australian Women, More Than a Hat and Glove Brigade. In 1991 she received the Peggy Hill Peace Award for service to world peace. She retired to Manly in 1993. This same year, she was interviewed about her life by historian Margaret Henry. Barbara died in 2000.

== Select publications ==
- Curthoys, B. (Barbara), and Audrey McDonald. More than a Hat and Glove Brigade : The Story of the Union of Australian Women. Sydney: Bookpress, 1996. ISBN 0949861162
