= Le Hommet-d'Arthenay =

- Part of Pont-Hébert
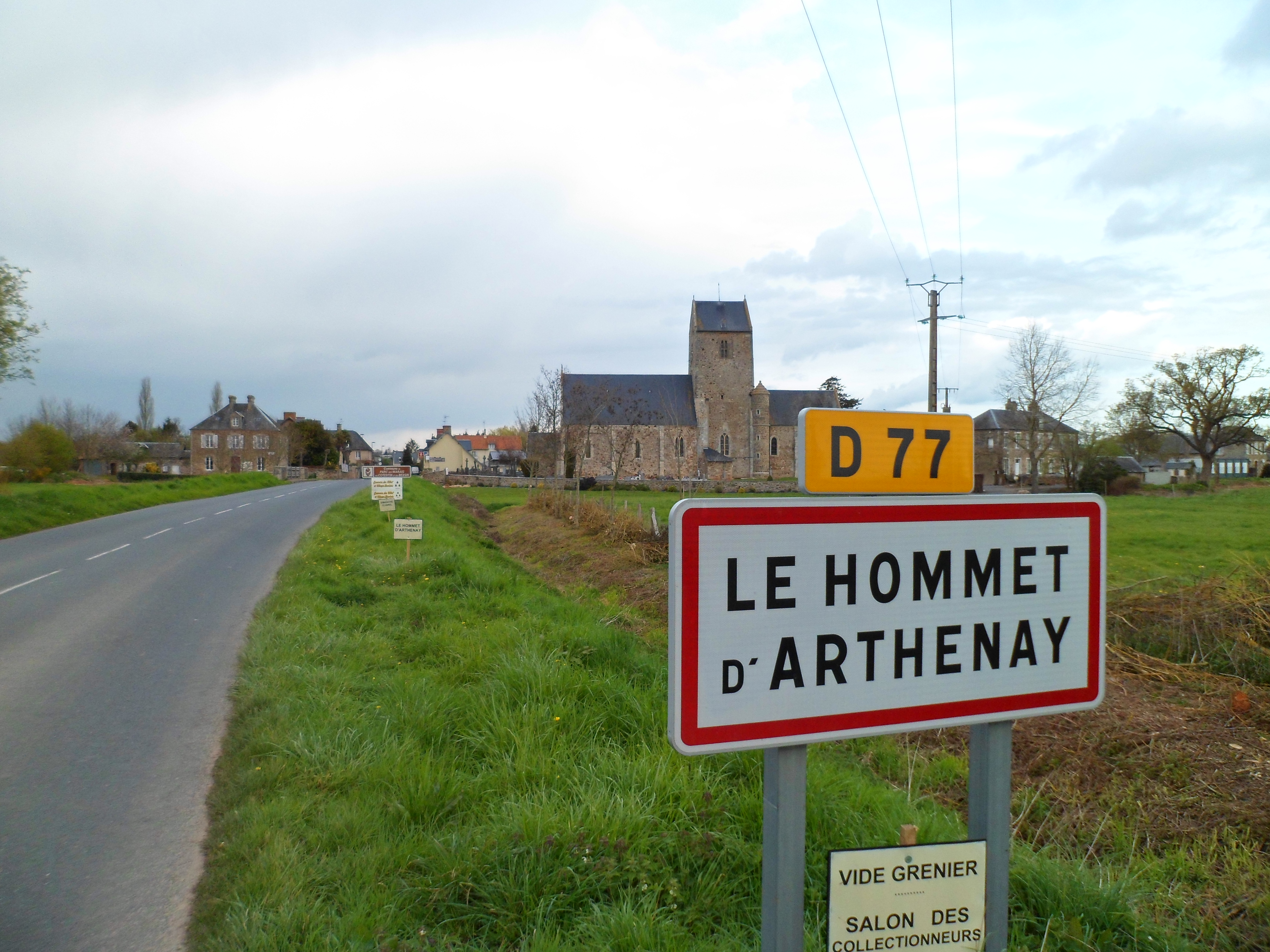
- Location of Le Hommet-d'Arthenay
- Location within France Location within Normandy
- Coordinates: 49°11′26″N 1°11′12″W
- Country: France
- Region: Normandy
- Department: Manche
- Arrondissement: Saint-Lô
- Canton: Pont-Hébert
- Commune: Pont-Hébert
- Area^{1}: 14.85 km^{2} (5.73 sq mi)
- Elevation: 4 m (13 ft)
- Highest elevation: 54 m (177 ft)
- Lowest elevation: 0 m (0 ft)
- Population (2019): 343
  - Density: 23.1/km^{2} (59.8/sq mi)
- Time zone: UTC+01:00 (CET)
  - Summer (DST): UTC+02:00 (CEST)
- Postal code: 50620
- Website: www.mairie-lehommetdarthenay.com
- ^{1} French Land Register data, which excludes lakes, ponds, glaciers > 1 km^{2} (0.386 sq mi or 247 acres) and river estuaries.

Le Hommet-d'Arthenay (French pronunciation: [lə ɔmɛ daʁtənɛ]) is a former commune in the Manche department in north-western France. On 1 January 2018, it was merged into the commune of Pont-Hébert.

== See also ==
- Communes of the Manche department
