= Cripley Meadow =

Coordinates: 51.760°N 1.274°W

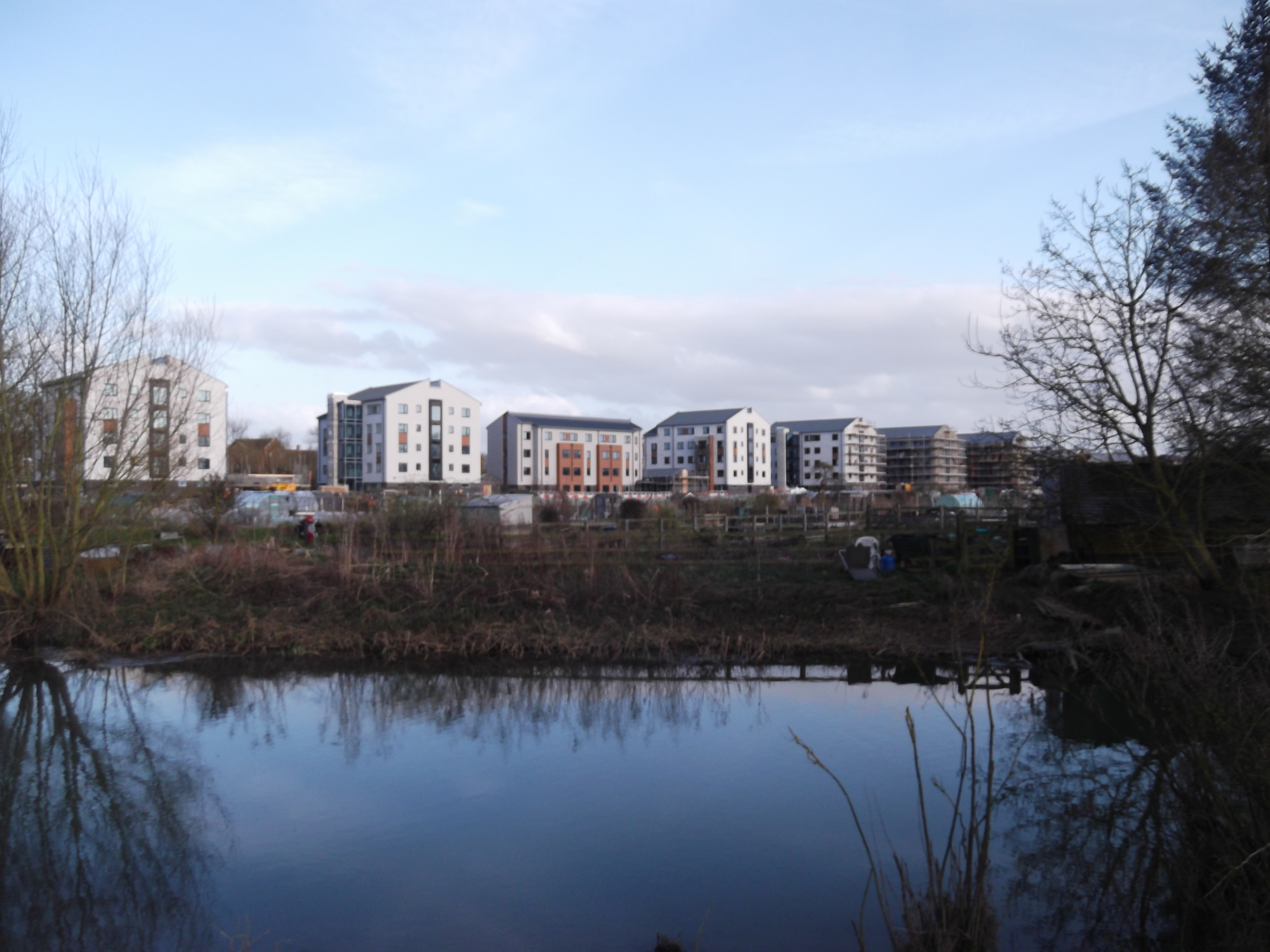

- Location within Oxfordshire
- District: Oxford
- Shire county: Oxfordshire
- Region: South East
- Country: England
- Sovereign state: United Kingdom
- Post town: Oxford
- Postcode district: OX2
- Dialling code: 01865
- Police: Thames Valley
- Fire: Oxfordshire
- Ambulance: South Central
- UK Parliament: Oxford West and Abingdon
- Website: Cripley Meadow Allotments Association

Cripley Meadow lies between the Castle Mill Stream, a backwater of the River Thames, and the Cotswold Line railway to the east, and Fiddler's Island, on the main branch of the Thames to the west, in Oxford, England. It is to the south of the better known Port Meadow, a large meadow of common land. To the south is Sheepwash Channel which connects the Oxford Canal with the River Thames.

== History ==
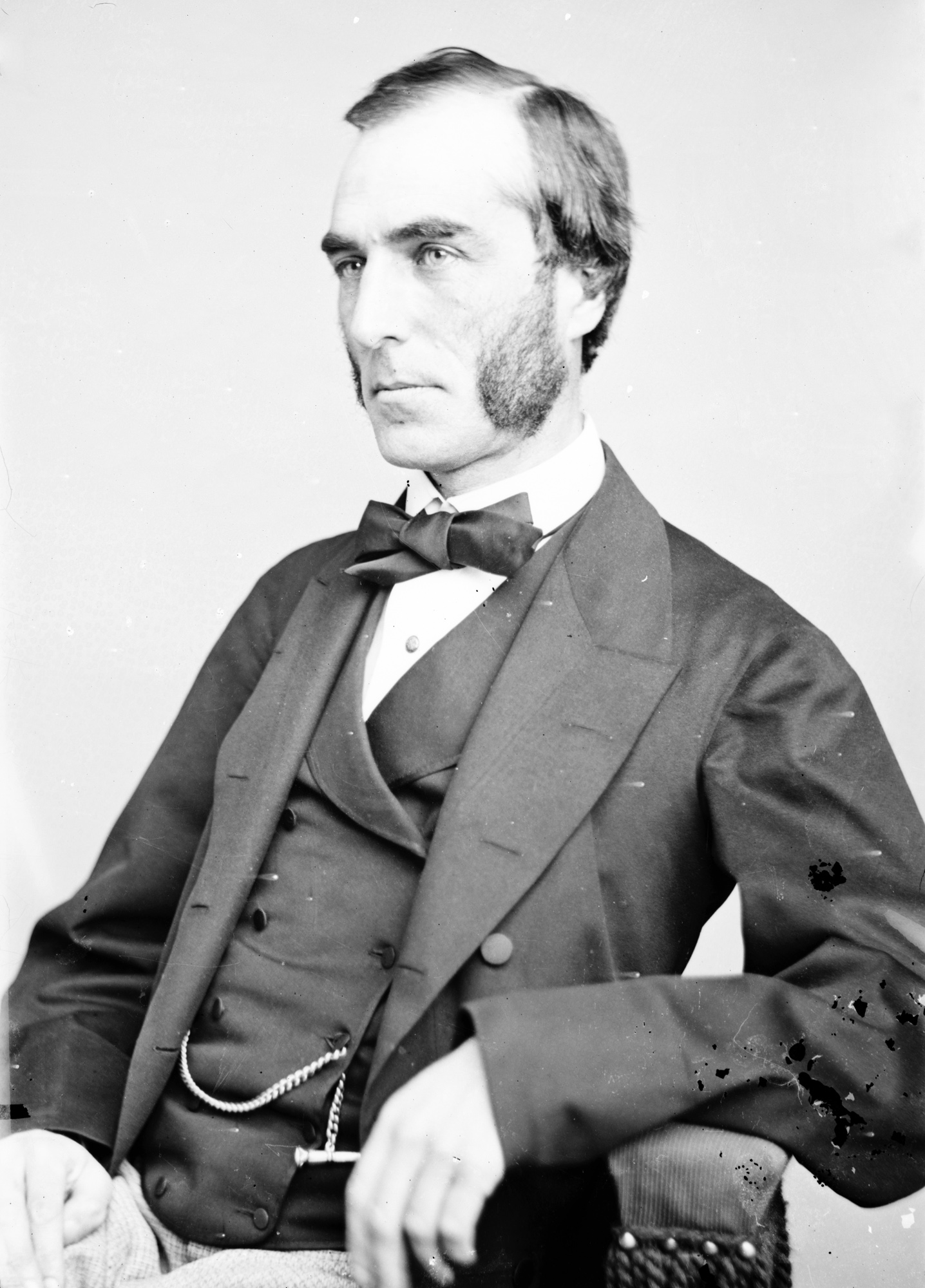
Goldwin Smith, a 19th-century Regius Professor of Modern History at Oxford University, who organized opposition to planned GWR carriage-making workshops at Cripley Meadow.

In October 1554, John Wayte (later Mayor of Oxford) was appointed along with two others to travel to London to give instructions concerning Cripley Meadow and Port Meadow.

In 1865, there was the possibility that the Great Western Railway (GWR) could become a major employer in Oxford since the company's railway carriage-making workshops, that were expected to provide 1,500 jobs, were to be sited in the city, moving from Paddington in London. The City of Oxford corporation, which thirty years earlier had opposed the railway, offered a lease on Cripley Meadow for the workshops. There was great enthusiasm for the initiative. However, the University of Oxford opposed the proposal, led by Goldwin Smith, a historian at University College, Oxford whose father had also been a director of GWR. A contract for the Cripley Meadow site was already in place, but a change in leadership at GWR meant that the workshops were built at Swindon instead.

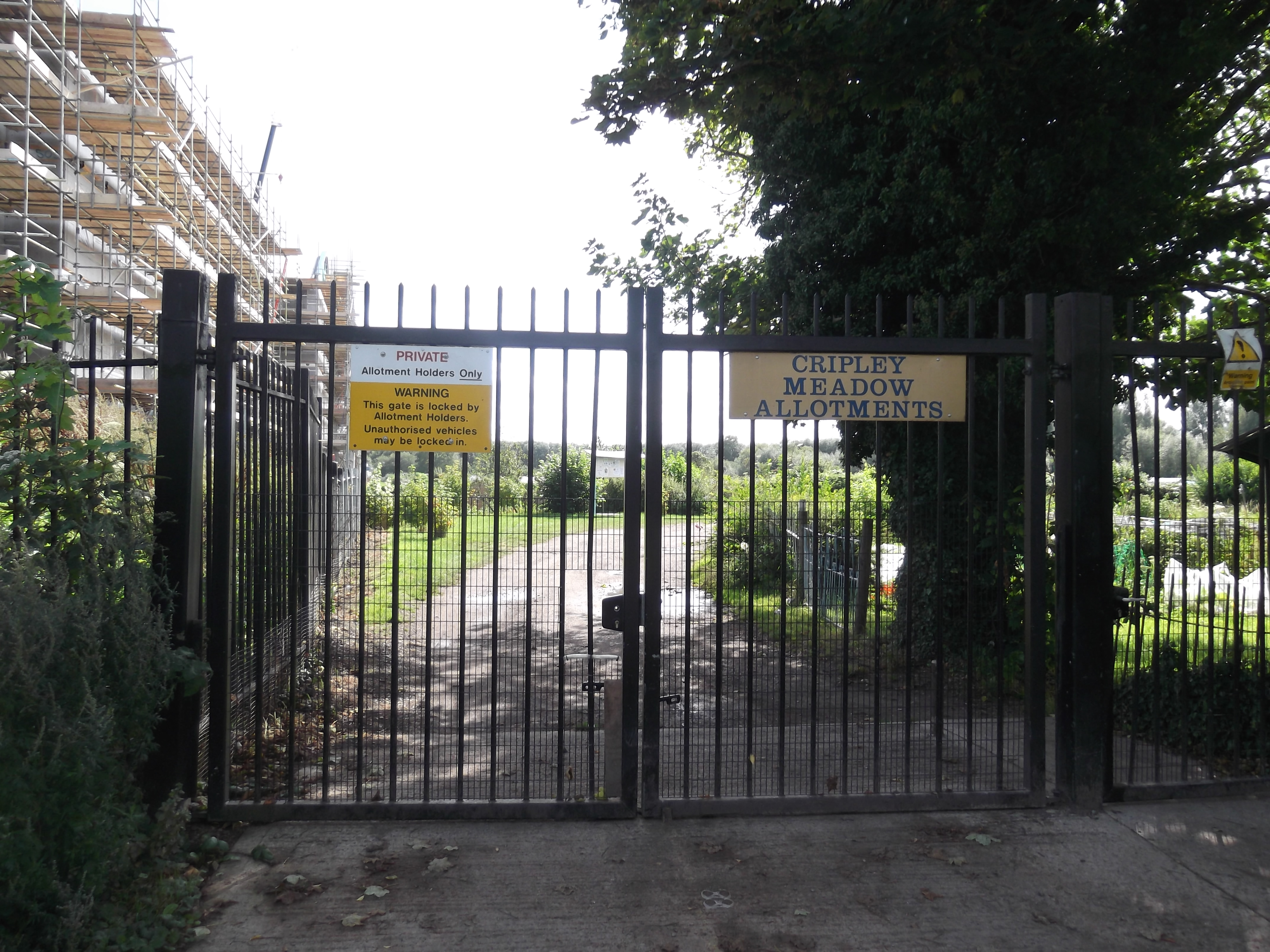
The entrance to Cripley Meadow allotments.

== Allotments ==
Before 1891, it is likely that Cripley Meadow was used for horse grazing, similar to Port Meadow, and also hay production. By March 1891, about 14 acres of the land was let to the North Oxford and Jericho Allotments Association for allotments. Over the following years, the city engineer organized the deposit of street refuse on the site to raise its level above the river.

Cripley Meadow Allotment Association is managed by an annually elected committee. Oxford City Council lease the land to the association and devolve its management to the committee. Since 2004 over 160 plots have been cleared and put back into use. It is now a thriving site supporting over 200 members in growing local food and flowers.

Cripley Island Orchard has also been established.

== Development ==
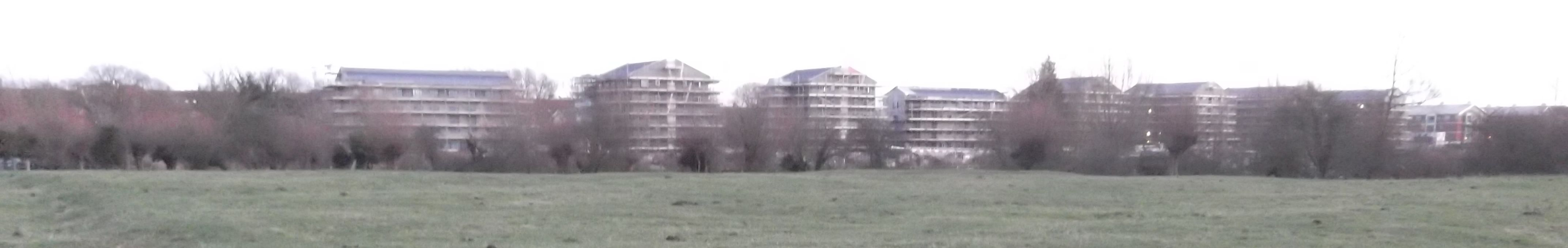
Panoramic view of new Oxford University graduate housing on what was Cripley Meadow, looking south from Port Meadow across.

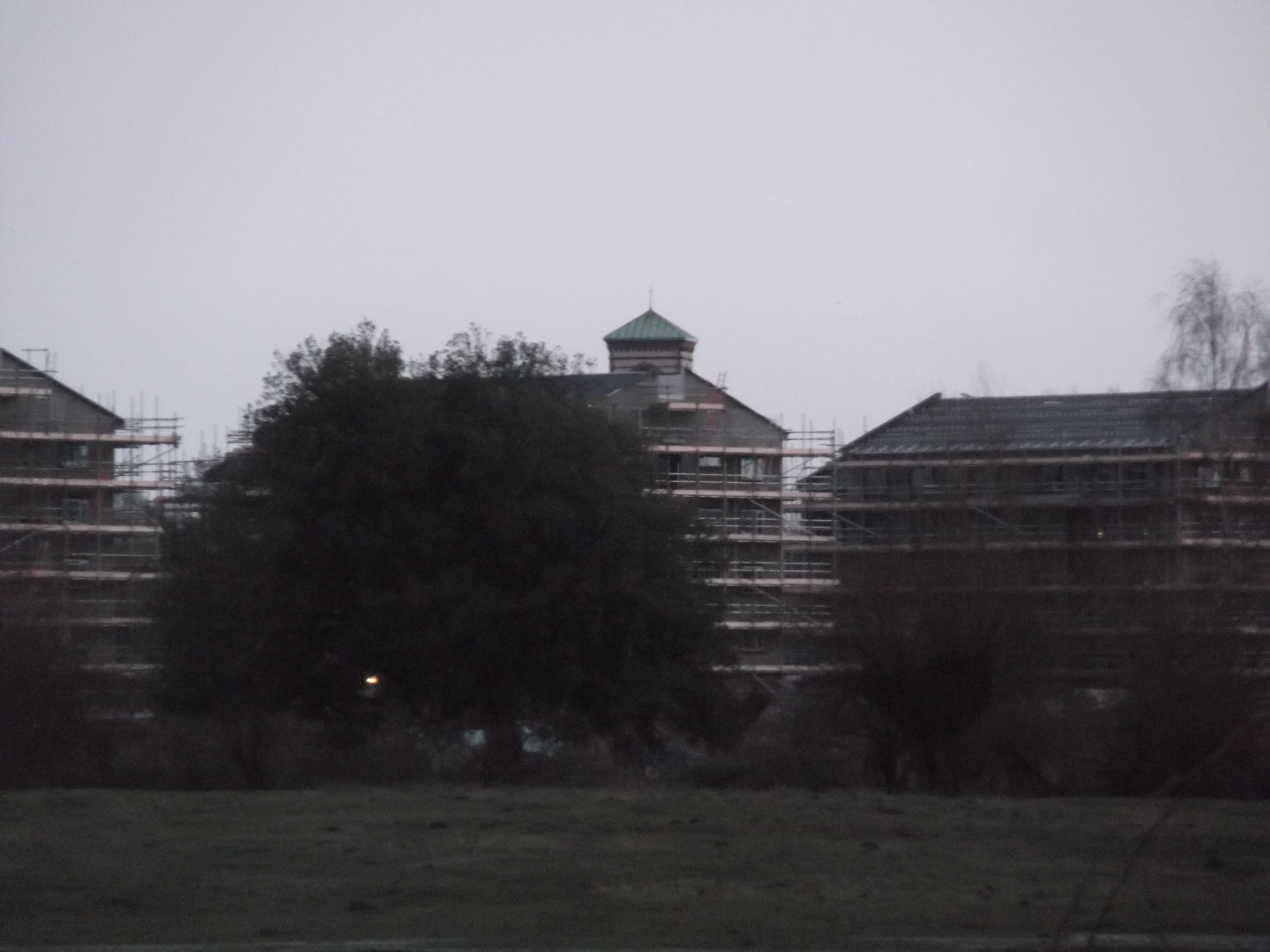
St Barnabas Church campanile obscured by new Oxford University graduate accommodation, looking across Cripley Meadow at the southern end of Port Meadow.

Since 2012, the Castle Mill site (400 m by 25 m) between the Cripley Meadow Allotments and the railway tracks is being developed as extensive student accommodation for the Oxford University Estates Directorate by Longcross. There is a badger run at the site.

The development of Castle Mill has been controversial since the four- and five-storey blocks overlook Port Meadow. Campaigners have warned of damage to views of Oxford. There has been an online petition and concern has been raised by the Oxford Preservation Trust and the Green Party. Anger has been caused even among members of Oxford University. The development has been likened to building a "skyscraper beside Stonehenge". In February 2013, Oxford City Council entered negotiations with Oxford University to reduce the height of the buildings by two storeys.

== See also ==
- Burgess Field
- Trap Ground Allotments
