= Ann Curthoys =

Australian historian and academic

Ann Curthoys AM, FASSA, FAHA
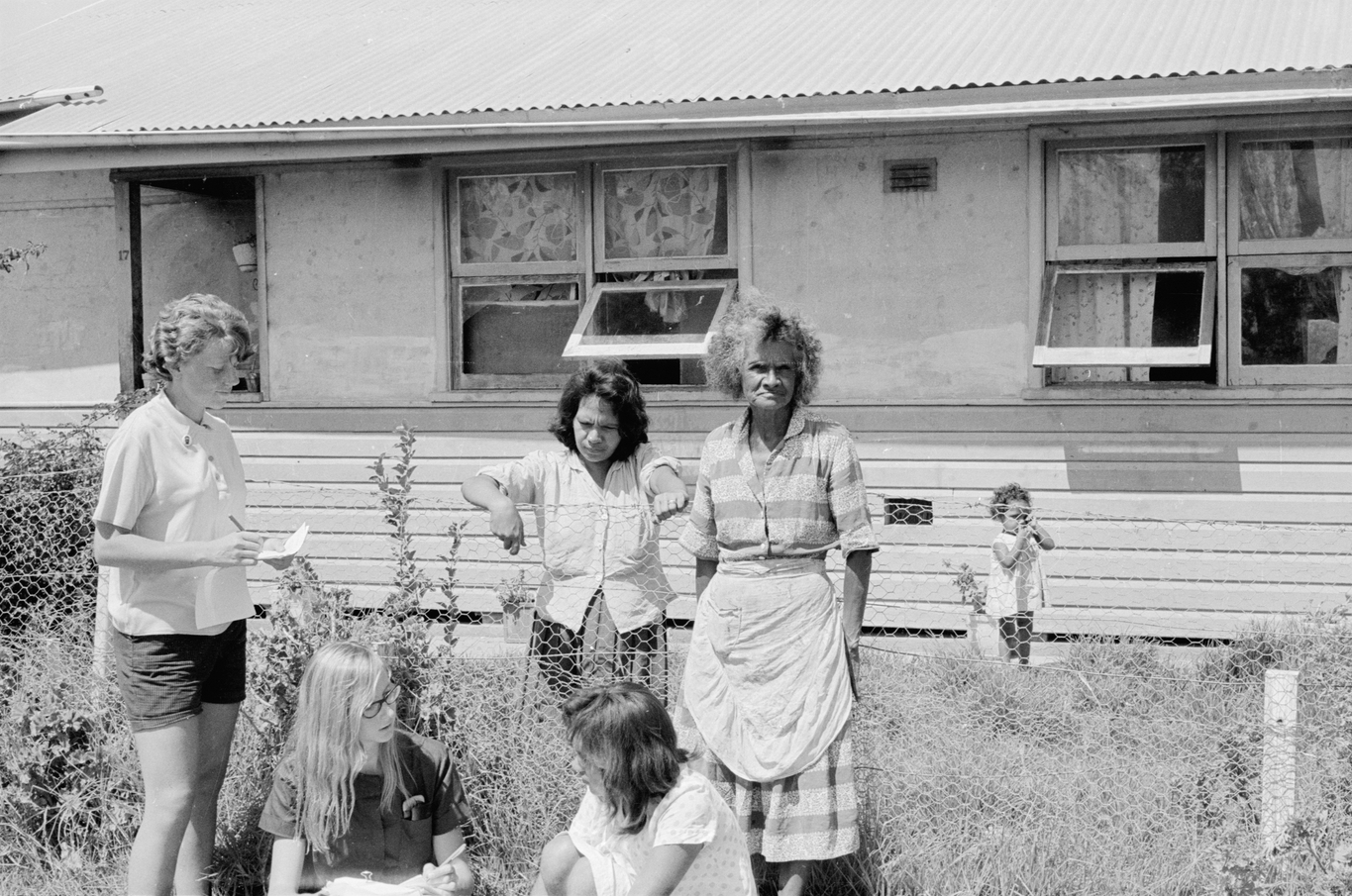
- Ann Curthoys (at left) interviewing residents at Moree Aboriginal Station during the Freedom Ride in February 1965
- Born: 5 September 1945 (age 81); Sydney, New South Wales
- Occupations: Historian and academic
- Title: Professor
- Parent: Barbara Curthoys
- Relatives: Jean Curthoys (sister)
- Awards: Fellow of the Academy of the Social Sciences in Australia (1997); Fellow of the Australian Academy of the Humanities (2003)

Academic background
- Education: University of Sydney (BA [Hons]); Macquarie University (PhD)
- Thesis: Race and Ethnicity: A Study of the Response of British Colonists to Aborigines, Chinese and non-British Europeans in New South Wales, 1856–1881 (1973)

Academic work
- Discipline: History
- Sub-discipline: Race relations Feminist theory Historiography
- Institutions: University of Sydney; Australian National University; University of Technology, Sydney

Ann Curthoys, AM, FASSA, FAHA (born 5 September 1945) is an Australian historian and academic.

== Early life and education ==
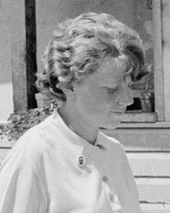
Ann Curthoys in 1965

Curthoys was born in Sydney, New South Wales, on 5 September 1945, and completed her undergraduate degree at the University of Sydney. In 1965, she took part in the Freedom Ride which highlighted racism against Aboriginal Australians in several towns. She completed a PhD at Macquarie University in 1973 and subsequently worked as a tutor and research assistant.

== Academic career ==
In 1976, Curthoys established the Women's Studies Program at the Australian National University (ANU) after becoming active in the women's movement in 1970. She taught at the University of Technology, Sydney from 1978 to 1995, when she returned to the ANU to take up the Chair of History. Curthoys was the Group of Eight Visiting Professor of Australian Studies at Georgetown University in 2003 and 2004. In addition to her teaching work, Curthoys has extensively published on Australian history and historiography.

Curthoys retired in 2013, but remains active as a researcher, writer and supervisor of graduate students at the University of Sydney.

== Recognition ==
In 1997, Curthoys was elected to the Academy of Social Sciences in Australia. She was also elected to the Australian Academy of the Humanities in 2003. In 2013 she was awarded the Annual History Citation by the History Council of NSW for "her outstanding contributions as an historian to teaching, scholarship and the community".

In 2019 the Australian Historical Association inaugurated the Ann Curthoys Prize, to be awarded for the best unpublished article-length work by an early career researcher.

In 2019 Curthoys was shortlisted for the NSW Premier's History Awards for Taking Liberty: Indigenous Rights and Settler Self-Government in Colonial Australia, 1830–1890, co-authored with Jessie Mitchell.

Curthoys was appointed a Member of the Order of Australia in the 2021 Queen's Birthday Honours for "significant service to tertiary education, to social history, and to research".

== Works ==
- Curthoys, Ann; Merritt, John (1984). Australia's First Cold War, 1945–1953. George Allen & Unwin. ISBN 978-0-04-909021-7.
- Curthoys, Ann (1988). For and Against Feminism: A Personal Journey Into Feminist Theory and History. Allen & Unwin. ISBN 978-0-04-310021-9.
- Curthoys, Ann; McGrath, Ann; Monash University. School of Historical Studies (2000). Writing Histories: Imagination and Narration. School of Historical Studies, Monash University. ISBN 978-0-7326-1768-4.
- Curthoys, Ann; Brissenden collection (2002). Freedom Ride: A Freedom Rider Remembers. Allen & Unwin. ISBN 978-1-86448-922-4.
- Curthoys, Ann; Docker, John (2006). Is History Fiction?. UNSW Press. ISBN 978-0-86840-380-9.
- Curthoys, Ann; Genovese, Ann; Reilly, Alex; Curthoys, Ann; Genovese, Ann; Reilly, Alexander (2008). Rights and Redemption: History, Law and Indigenous People. UNSW Press. ISBN 978-0-86840-807-1.
- Curthoys, Ann; McGrath, Ann; ebrary, Inc (2009). How to Write History that People Want to Read. UNSW Press. ISBN 978-1-74223-086-3.
- Curthoys, Ann; Damousi, Joy, eds. (2014). What Did You Do in the Cold War, Daddy?: Personal Stories from a Troubled Time. NewSouth Publishing. ISBN 978-1-74223-391-8.
