= Jean Curthoys =

Australian feminist philosopher

Jean Curthoys (born 1947) is an Australian feminist philosopher.

She was born in Broken Hill, New South Wales, the daughter of Geoffrey and Barbara Curthoys, leading members of the Communist Party of Australia. Her sister Ann Curthoys is an academic historian. After studying science and philosophy at the University of Sydney, she helped teach the first feminist philosophy course in Sydney in 1973. Her 1997 book, Feminist Amnesia, accuses later academic feminist theory of abandoning the liberation theory of the 1960s for an intellectually and morally sterile careerism.

She is a contributor to Goodbye to All That? On the Failure of Neo-liberalism and the Urgency of Change, ed. D. McKnight and R. Manne (Black Inc, 2010). She saw through the press and wrote an introduction to Vic Dudman's work on the priority of grammar over logic, Victor Dudman's Grammar and Semantics (Palgrave Macmillan, 2012).

She was married to philosopher Alan Olding and later to photographer and historian John Williams.
