= Dudman, Shiraz =

Dudman دودمان
- Village
- Location within Iran
- Coordinates: 29°31′27″N 52°35′18″E
- Country: Iran
- Province: Fars
- County: Shiraz
- Bakhsh: Central
- Rural District: Qarah Bagh

Population (2006)
  - Total: 344
- Time zone: UTC+3:30 (IRST)
  - Summer (DST): UTC+4:30 (IRDT)

Dudman (Persian: دودمان, also Romanized as Dūdmān and Doodman; also known as Qal‘eh Dūdmān) is a village in Qarah Bagh Rural District, in the Central District of Shiraz County, Fars province, Iran. At the 2006 census, its population was 344, in 99 families.
