= Dowdeman, Darab =

Dowdeman دودمان
- Village
- Location within Iran
- Coordinates: 28°32′30″N 55°19′38″E
- Country: Iran
- Province: Fars
- County: Darab
- Bakhsh: Rostaq
- Rural District: Kuhestan

Population (2006)
  - Total: 19
- Time zone: UTC+3:30 (IRST)
  - Summer (DST): UTC+4:30 (IRDT)

Dowdeman (Persian: دودمان, also Romanized as Dowdemān; also known as Dowdehān) is a village in Kuhestan Rural District, Rostaq District, Darab County, Fars province, Iran. At the 2006 census, its population was 19, in 4 families.
