= Vic Dudman =

Australian logician

Victor Howard ("Vic") Dudman (October 10, 1935 – January 10, 2009) was an Australian logician based at Macquarie University.

Born in Sydney, he was greatly influenced by Willard Van Orman Quine on whose work he based his undergraduate logic courses.

He is particularly noted for his views on the interpretation of the material conditional. David Lewis, a frequent visitor to Australian departments of logic, once noted "If Dudman's view is correct, and I cannot at the moment see what is wrong with it, then almost everything I have written on conditionals is mistaken".

Jean Curthoys saw through the press and wrote an introduction to Victor Dudman's Grammar and Semantics (Palgrave Macmillan, 2012).
