= Roger Dudman =

Roger Alan Dudman (15 October 1925 - 12 June 1990) was the Labour mayor of Oxford (England) between 1985 and 1986, succeeding the Conservative Frank Arnold Garside. Roger represented the West ward on Oxford City Council, retiring the same year his term as mayor ended.

The Labour Party retained the office on the Oxford City Council until 1988, when Nellie Dorothy ("Queenie") Whorley (later Mrs Comfort) was elected. The period of office of Lord Mayor was for one year and allocated on seniority of serving on Oxford City Council.

Roger Dudman died in 1990 and several local landmarks bear his name posthumously including the Oxford road, Roger Dudman Way, north of Oxford railway station, the site of the Castle Mill student blocks.
