= Southmoor Road =

Road in North Oxford, England

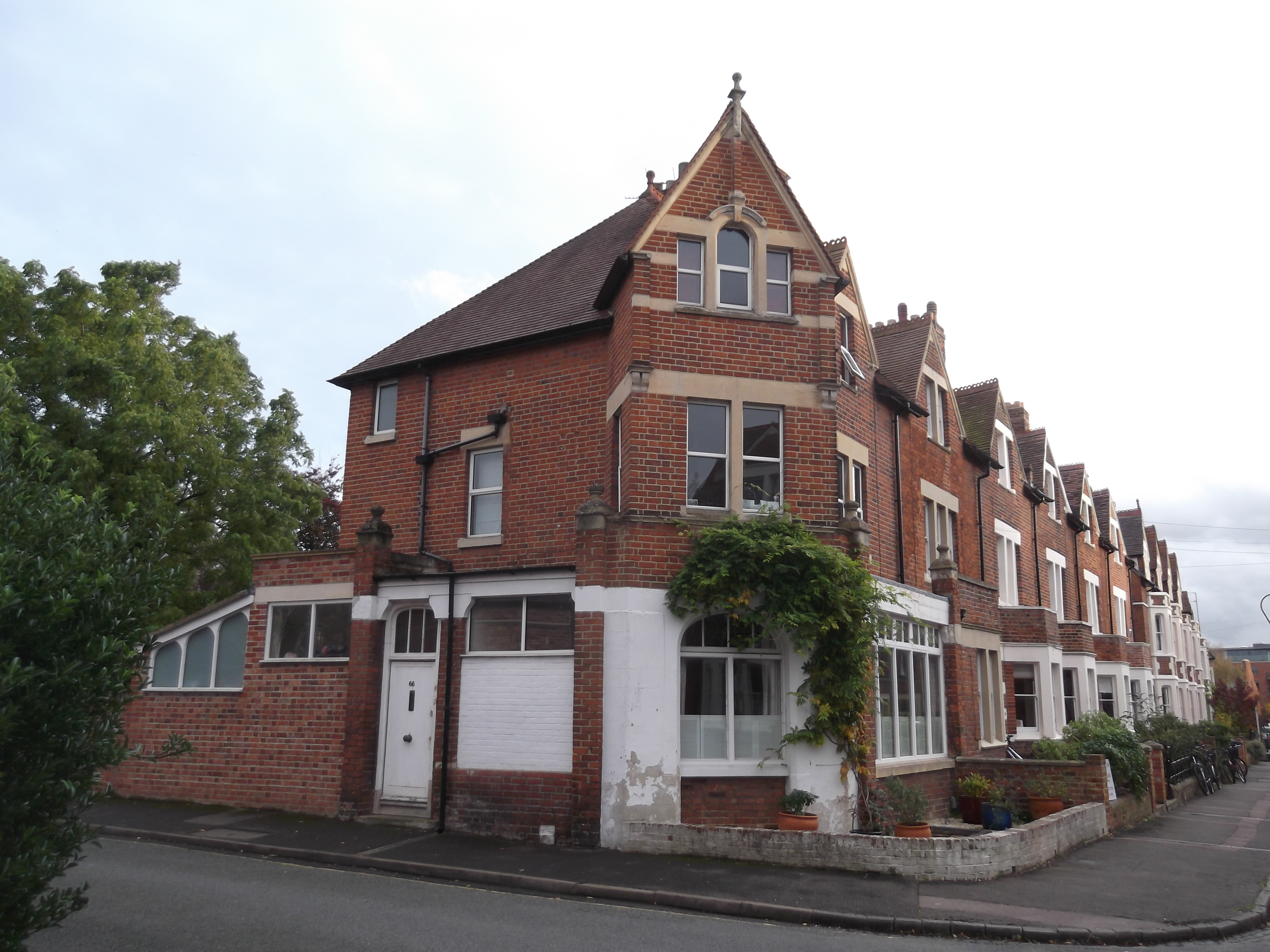
- View of houses south from the junction with Southmoor Place
- Interactive map of Southmoor Road
- Postal code: OX2
- Coordinates: 51.76396°N 1.27019°W
- North end: Kingston Road
- Major junctions: Southmoor Place
- South end: Longworth Road; Walton Well Road

Construction
- Construction start: 1883
- Completion: 1895

Other
- Designer: Wilkinson & Moore; Harry Wilkinson Moore; J. C. Gray
- Known for: Blue plaque for Chiang Yee

Southmoor Road is a residential road in Walton Manor, north Oxford, England.

== Location ==
The road runs north–south, with a turn to the east to join Kingston Road, which runs parallel to the east, at its northern end. At the southern end, there is a junction with Longworth Road and Walton Well Road. Halfway along is a junction with Southmoor Place to the east, also linking it with Kingston Road. To the west is the Oxford Canal. To the south is the district of Jericho. The houses have been described as "large small house(s)" as opposed to the "small large house(s)" in the Chalfont Road area to the northeast.

== History ==
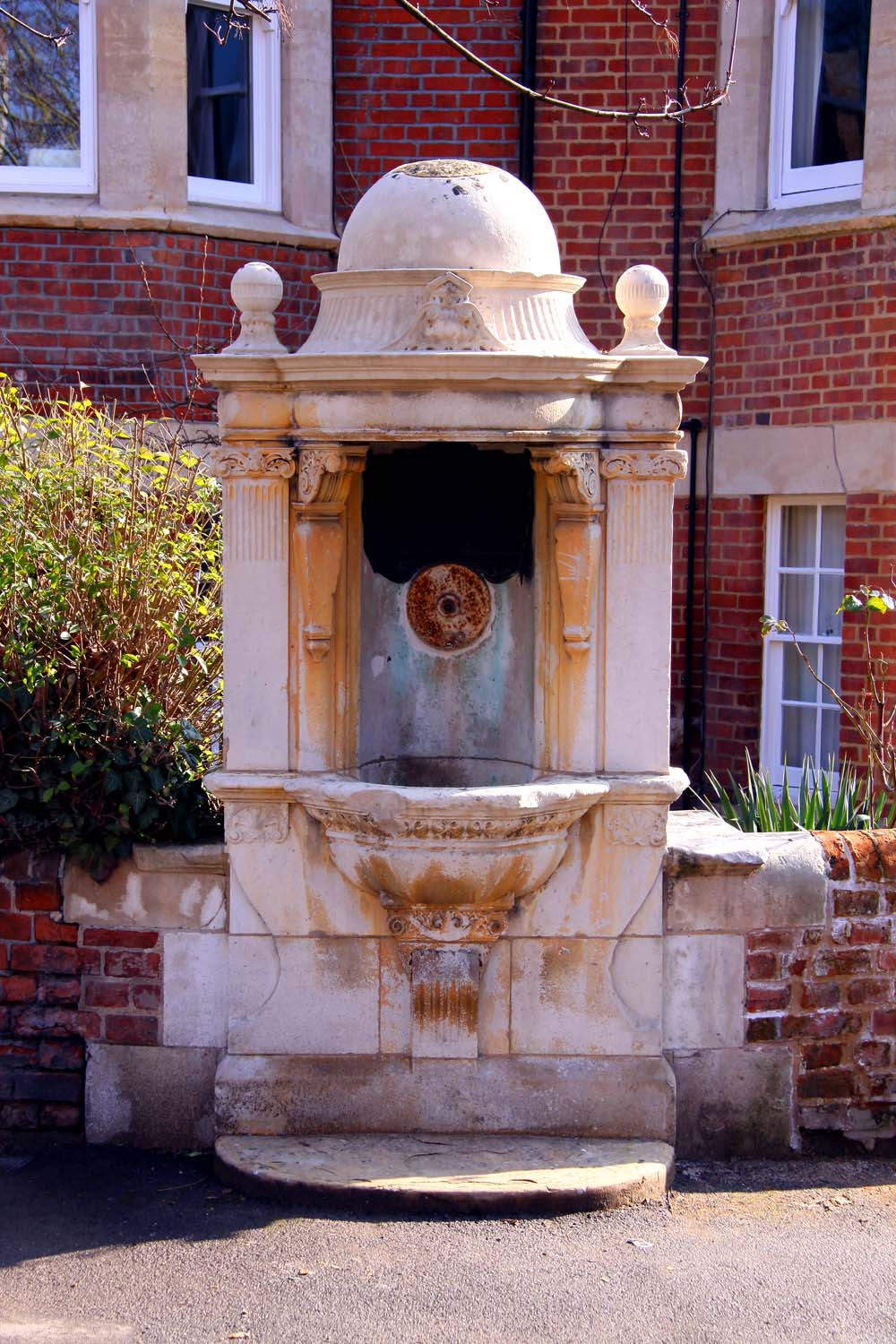
1885 Walton Well Drinking Fountain at the junction of Southmoor Road, Longworth Road, and Walton Well Road

Houses in the road were originally leased between 1883 and 1895 as part of the North Oxford estate of St John's College. The houses were mainly designed by the architectural partnership of Wilkinson & Moore, with some by Harry Wilkinson Moore and J. C. Gray.

At the southern end of Southmoor Road, at the junction with Longworth Road and Walton Well Road, a drinking fountain was installed in 1885 on the site of a water spring. It was erected by William Ward, who was earlier Mayor of Oxford for the years 1851 and 1861. The fountain was designed by Harry Wilkinson Moore, architect of many of the houses in Southmoor Road, and carved in Portland stone by McCulloch of London.

The road includes a blue plaque, unveiled on 29 June 2019, for the Chinese artist and writer Chiang Yee (1903–1977) at 28 Southmoor Road, where he lived during 1940–1955. Here he worked on the illustrated book The Silent Traveller in Oxford, first published by Methuen in 1944.

In previous times, the road has been relatively down-market, but it is now a desirable area. Residents in the road celebrated its centenary with a street party on 22 June 1986.

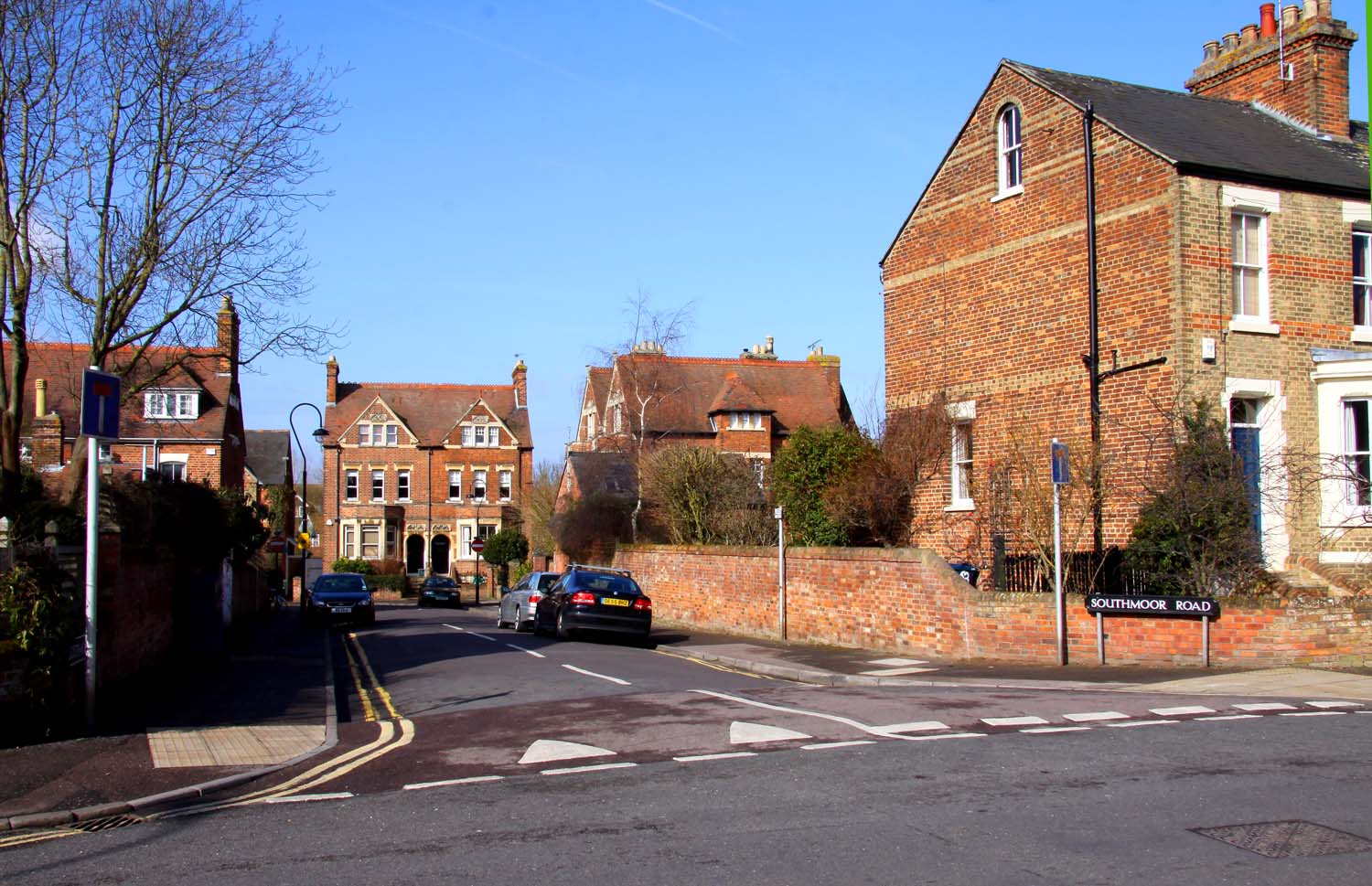
Southmoor Road at the junction with Kingston Road

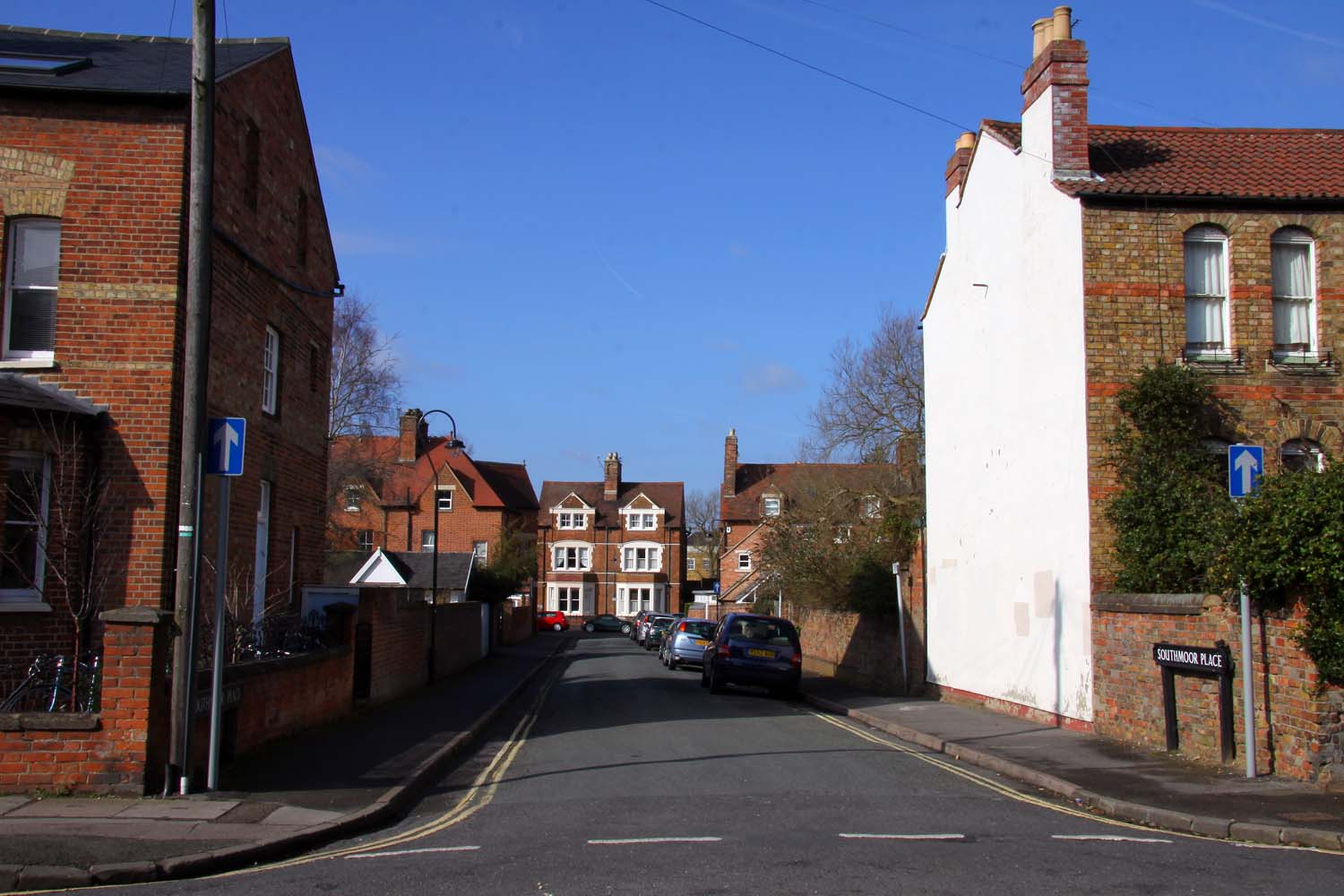
Southmoor Place at its junction with Kingston Road, looking towards Southmoor Road

== See also ==
- Northmoor Road
