= Longworth Road =

Road in North Oxford, England

Coordinates: 51.762468°N 1.269479°W

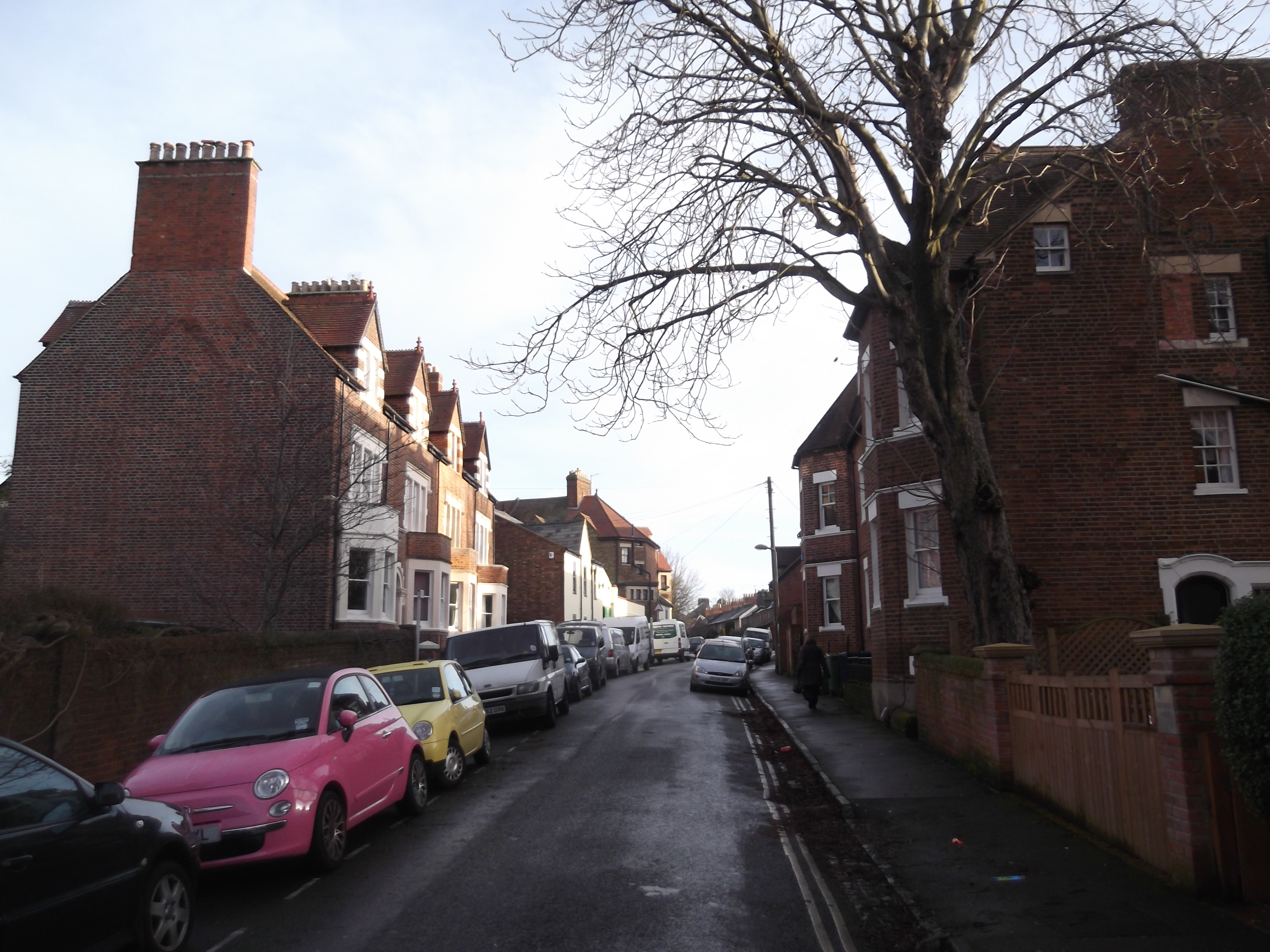
View northeast along Longworth Road

Longworth Road is a residential road in Walton Manor, North Oxford, England.

== Location ==
The road runs southwest–northeast, between a junction with Southmoor Road and Walton Well Road to the southwest and Kingston Road opposite Leckford Road to the northeast. To the south is the district of Jericho. Houses in the road are terraced and semi-detached.

A greengrocer, Kingston Fruiterers, is located at the northeast end of Longworth Road, on the junction with Kingston Road. They supply Oxford University colleges, among other clients.

== History ==
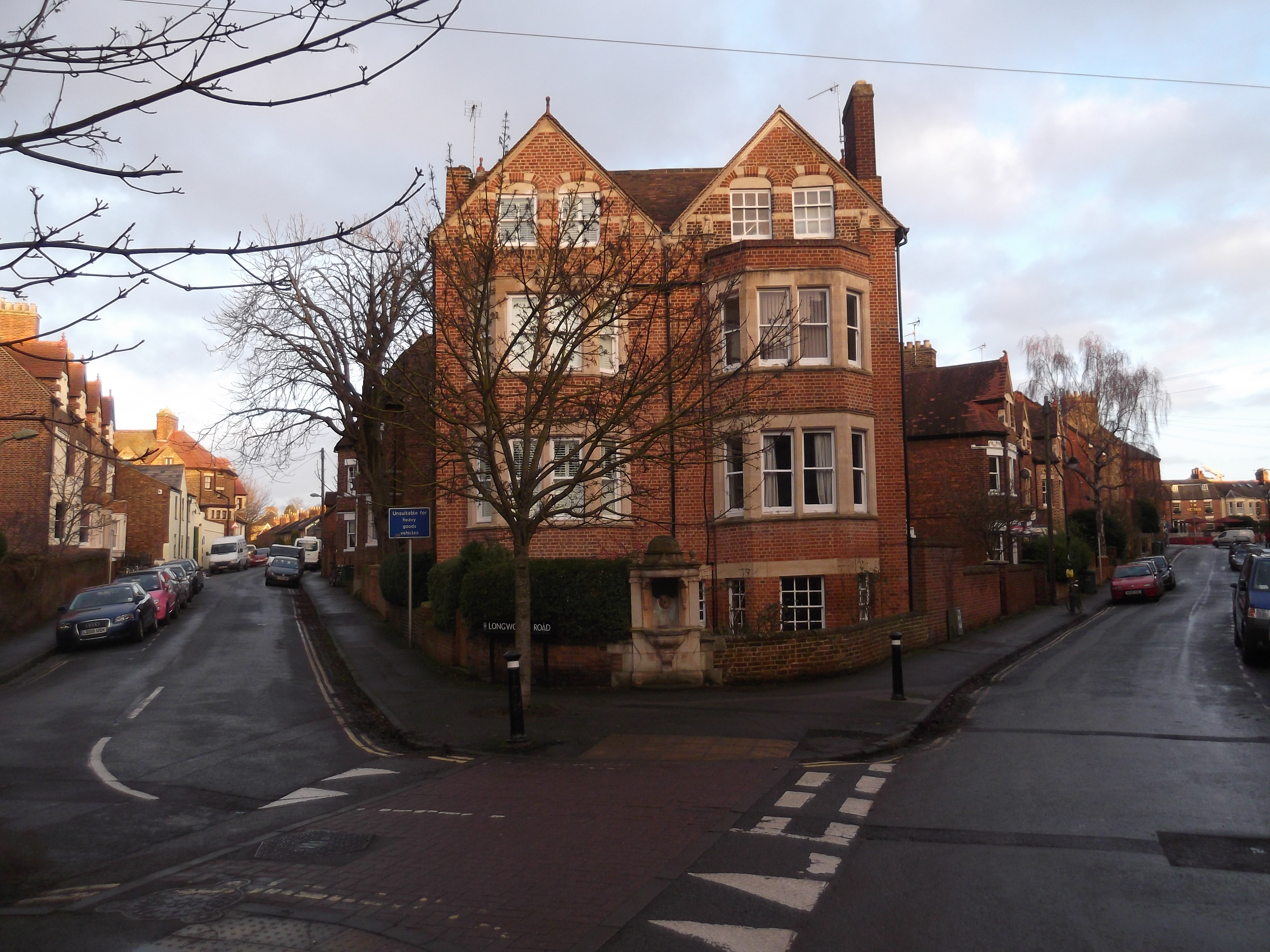
Longworth Road (left) and Walton Well Road (right), with the Walton Well Drinking Fountain between

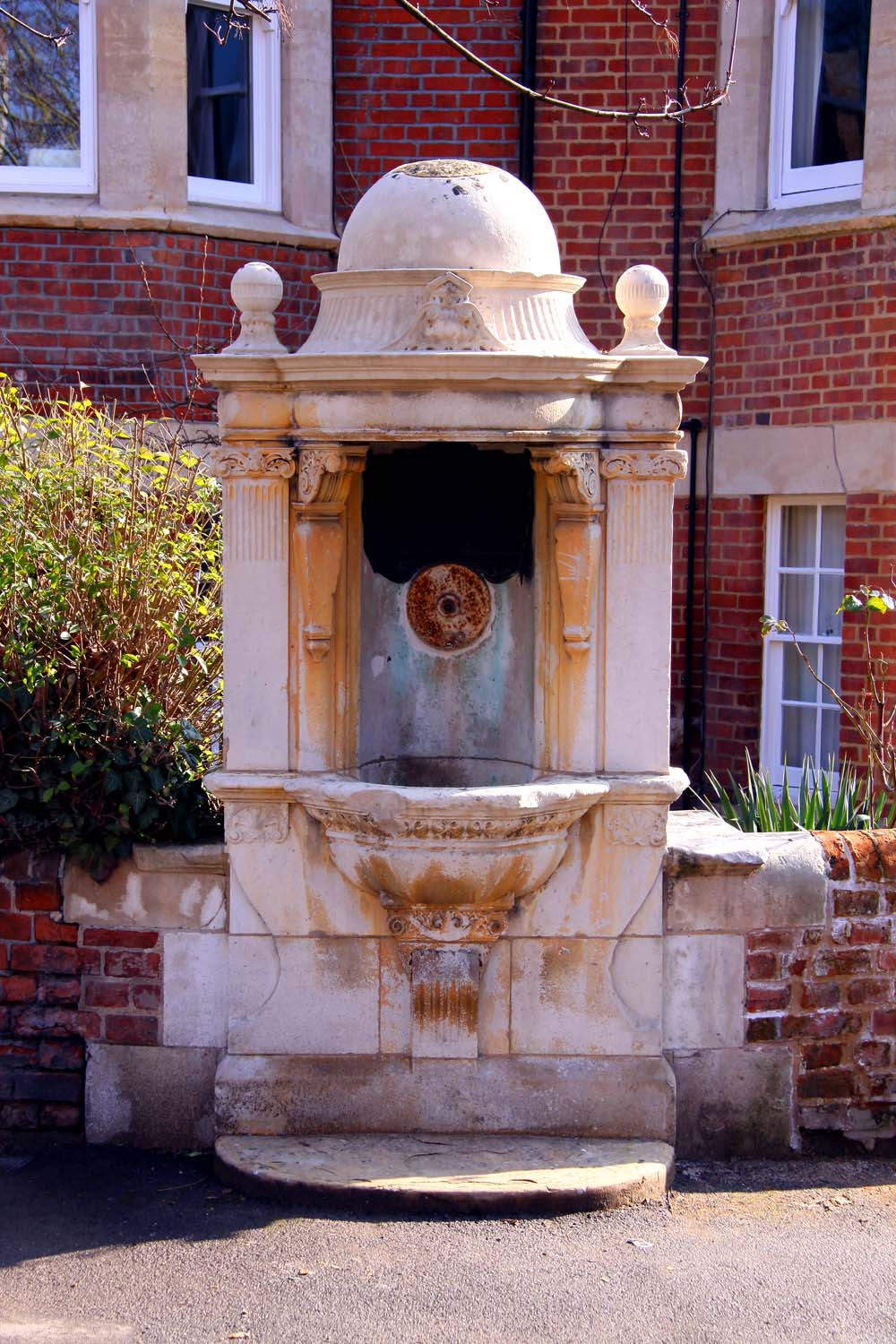
1885 Walton Well Drinking Fountain at the junction of Longworth Road and Walton Well Road

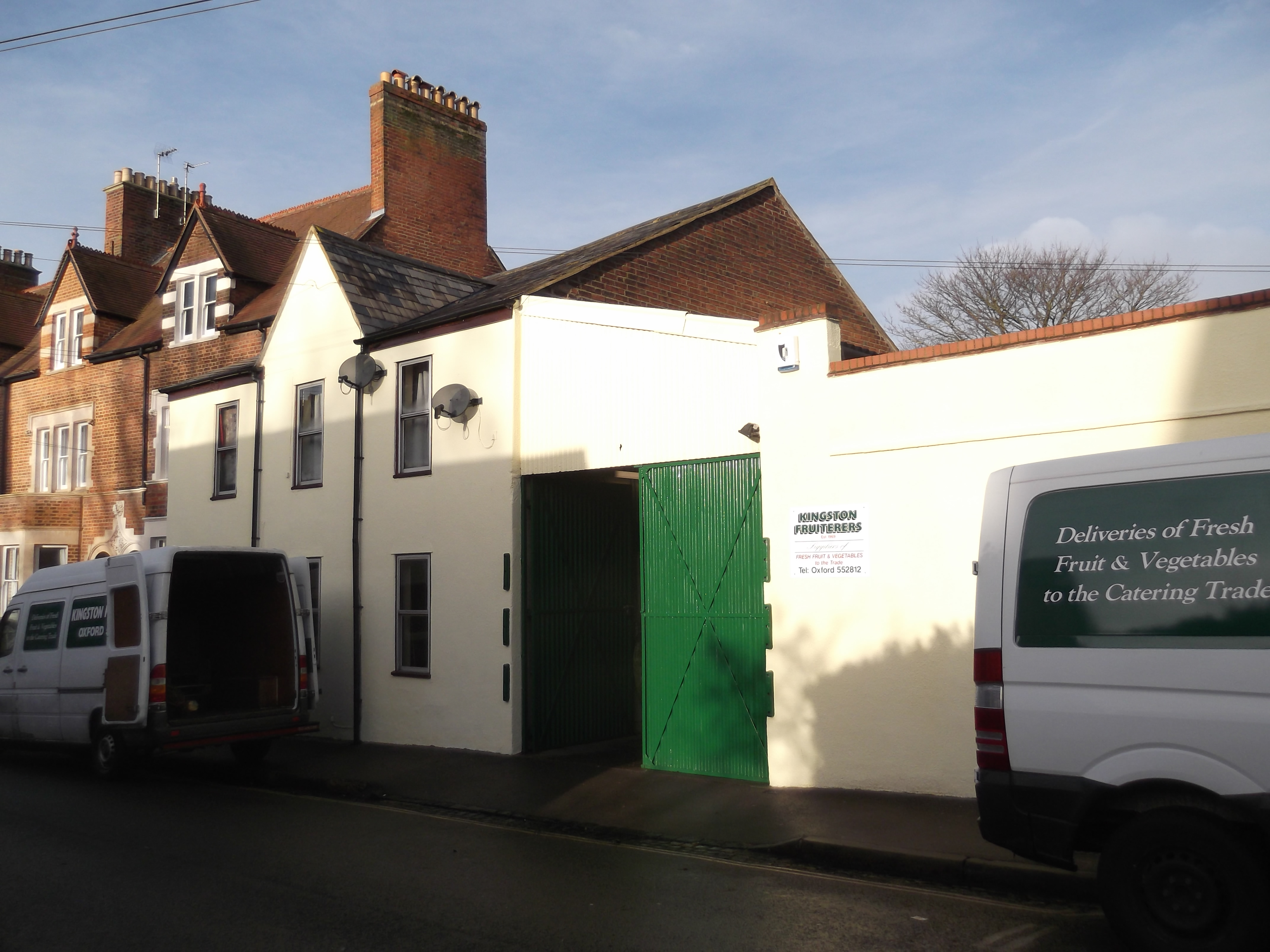
Kingston Fruiterers on Longworth Road

Houses in the road were originally leased between 1887 and 1890 as part of the North Oxford estate of St John's College. The street was named in 1890–1, probably after the village of Longworth, historically in Berkshire and now in Oxfordshire, with St John's College connections.

At the southwestern end, at the junction with Walton Well Road, a drinking fountain was installed in 1885 on the site of a water spring. It was erected by William Ward, who was earlier Mayor of Oxford for the years 1851 and 1861. The fountain was designed by Harry Wilkinson Moore, architect of many of the houses in the adjoining Southmoor Road, and carved in Portland stone by McCulloch of London.
