= Dymia Hsiung =

Chinese writer

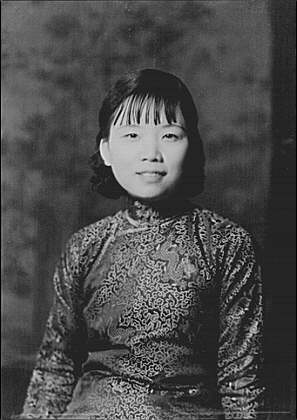
- Born: Cai Daimei; 1905; Nanchang, China
- Died: 1987 (aged 81–82)
- Resting place: Hampstead Cemetery
- Occupation: Writer
- Known for: Being the first Chinese woman to publish a full-length work in Britain.
- Notable work: Flowering Exile: An Autobiographical Excursion
- Spouse: Hsiung Shih-I (m. 1923)

Dymia Hsiung (Cai Daimei; 1905–1987) was a Chinese writer, and the first Chinese woman to publish a full-length work in Britain. During the 1930s and 1940s, she and her husband, playwright Hsiung Shih-I, were well known throughout the country.

== Early life ==
Dymia was born into a literary family in 1905 in Nanchang, China. She married Shih-I Hsiung in 1923. Dymia studied Chinese literature at the National University of Beiping from 1931 to 1935. After graduation, she joined her husband in Britain, where he had been since 1932.

== Flowering Exile ==
In England, the Hsiungs moved in a distinguished literary milieu. Their circle, including fellow writers Chiang Yee and Xiao Qian, has been described as a "Chinese Bloomsbury".

Hsiung's fictional autobiography, Flowering Exile: An Autobiographical Excursion, was published in 1952, and was the first full-length work of either fiction or autobiography published by a Chinese woman in Britain. Originally written in Chinese, it was translated by Hsiung's husband, Shih-I. The book told the story of the Hsiungs' life in Britain between the late 1930s to the early 1950s. Though press at the time criticized Flowering Exile as "'prosaic' when compared to other contemporary tales of a ‘China of legend’ that captured ‘the strangeness and the charm of that fabled land’", Diana Yeh has noted that though:

Flowering Exile remained firmly within the middle-class sphere... as an account of Chinese family life in Britain, it also transgressed existing literary boundaries.

In the same year, Hsiung contributed two essays in Chinese to Tienfeng Monthly.

== Death and legacy ==
Dymia Hsiung died in 1987, aged eighty-two, and was buried in Hampstead Cemetery. Her death was announced in The Times, and in the two overseas Chinese newspapers, Sing Tao and Wing Pei.

In 2014, Dymia and Shih-I Hsiung—"two once highly visible, but now largely forgotten Chinese writers in Britain"—were the subject of a shared biography by scholar and activist Diana Yeh. This was described as "the first biographical book in any language to offer a critical survey of Shih-I Hsiung's family story, which has been long obscured and underreported".
