= Hsiung Shih-I =

Chinese writer & playwright (1902–1991)

- 熊式一
- Born: October 14, 1902; Nanchang, China
- Died: 1991 (aged 88–89)
- Other names: S. I. Hsiung, Xiong Shiyi
- Education: Peiping University; Queen Mary College, University of London
- Occupations: writer, biographer, translator, academic, playwright
- Known for: translating plays: English to Chinese, Chinese to English
- Notable work: Lady Precious Stream
- Spouse: Dymia Hsiung

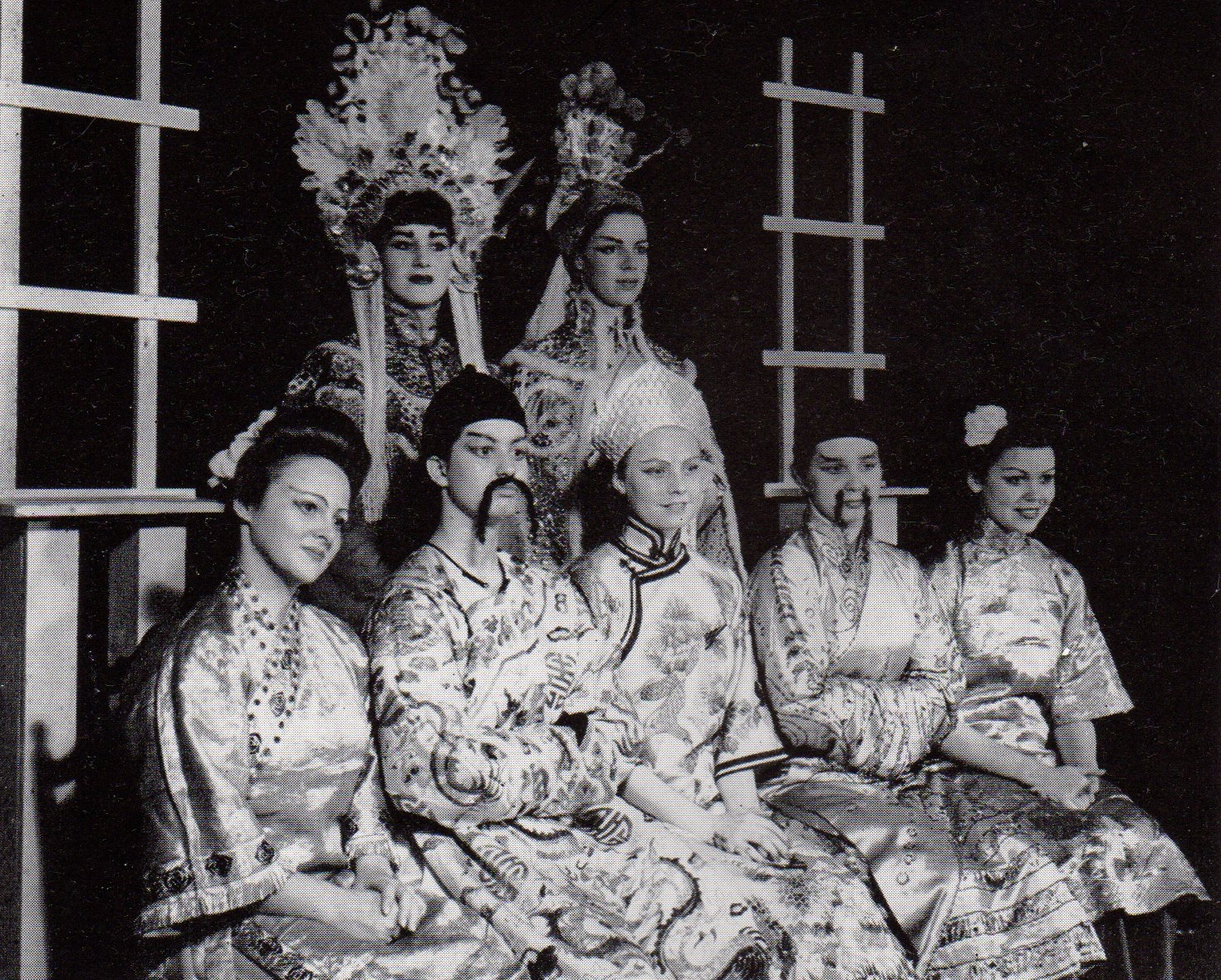
Performance of Lady Precious Stream at Shimer College in 1942

Hsiung Shih-I (Chinese: 熊式一; also S. I. Hsiung or Xiong Shiyi; 1902–1991) was a writer, biographer, translator, academic, and playwright in Beijing and London. He was the first Chinese person to direct a West End play, and the founder of Tsing Hua Academy in Hong Kong.

== Biography ==
Hsiung was born in Nanchang on October 14, 1902, and educated at Beijing Normal University (then National Peiping Normal University). As a professor and writer in China, Hsiung translated plays by George Bernard Shaw and J.M. Barrie. He also published a successful Chinese translation of The Autobiography of Benjamin Franklin. He taught at universities in Beijing and Nanchang as well as Nanyang University in Singapore.

In 1932, he moved to England, studying English literature at Queen Mary College, University of London and translating Chinese plays into English. After the success of Lady Precious Stream in 1934, however, he abandoned his studies.

In 1935, Hsiung's Lady Precious Stream, based on the Chinese folklore Wang Baochuan and Xue Pinggui, was performed at the Little Theatre in John Street, London, by the People's National Theatre, directed by Nancy Price and Hsiung, and ran for 1,000 nights. The play was also later performed on Broadway at the Booth Theatre in New York, produced by Morris Gest. It was adapted for television in 1950.

Hsiung's subsequent works were also successful, but did not match the success of Lady Precious Stream.

== Relationships ==
Hsiung's wife, Dymia Hsiung, was the first Chinese woman in Britain to author a fictionalized autobiography. They shared a flat in Hampstead, north London, with fellow expatriate Chiang Yee, author of The Silent Traveller series. Hsiung's great-grandson is comedian Ken Cheng.

== Legacy ==
Diana Yeh, a sociologist and social activist, gave the lives of Shih-I and Dymia shared attention in a 2014 biography, The Happy Hsiungs: Performing China and the Struggle for Modernity, published by Hong Kong University Press. It describes the "lost histories" of "two once highly visible, but now largely forgotten Chinese writers in Britain, who sought to represent China and Chineseness to the rest of the world." Yeh took the first phrase of her title from an illustrated article in Good Housekeeping magazine in the 1950s, depicting the couple at home in Oxford. The article formed part of a 2022-2023 British Library exhibition, entitled Chinese and British.

== Works ==
- Lady Precious Stream: an old Chinese play done into English according to its traditional style by S.I. Hsiung (Wang Pao-ch'uan), 1935
- The Romance of the Western Chamber, 1935 (trans.)
- The Professor from Peking, 1939
- The Bridge of Heaven, 1943
- The Life of Chiang Kai-Shek, 1948

== Works cited ==
- Pronko, Leonard Cabell (1967). "Lady Precious Stream". Theater East and West: Perspectives Toward a Total Theater. University of California Press. pp. 51–55. ISBN 9780520026223.
- Yeh, Diana (2014). The Happy Hsiungs. Hong Kong University Press. ISBN 9789888208173.
- Zhou, Yupei (2002). "Shih-I Hsiung". In Miles Liu (ed.). Asian American Playwrights: A Bio-bibliographical Critical Sourcebook. Bloomsbury Academic. pp. 121–125. ISBN 9780313314551.
