= Walton Well Drinking Fountain =

Historic drinking fountain in Oxford, England

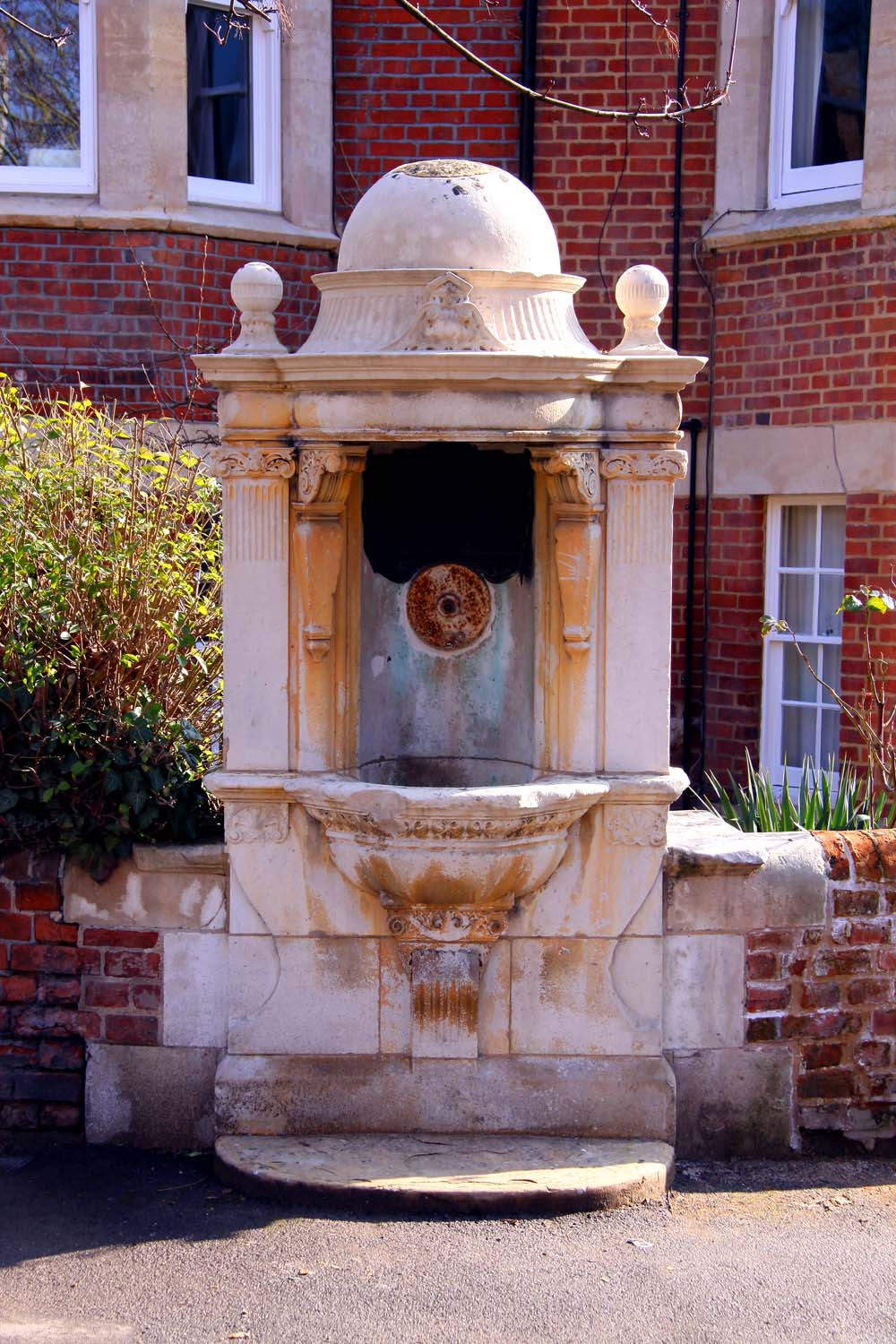

- Location within Oxfordshire
- Former names: Walton Well; Bruman's or Brumman's Well

General information
- Architectural style: Neo-Baroque
- Location: Walton Well Road, Oxford, England
- Coordinates: 51°45′44.010″N 1°16′11.824″W
- Completed: 1885
- Client: William Ward

Technical details
- Material: Portland stone

Design and construction
- Architect: Harry Wilkinson Moore
- Engineer: McCulloch of London

The Walton Well Drinking Fountain is a historic drinking fountain in north Oxford, England. It is located at the junction of Walton Well Road, Longworth Road, and Southmoor Road, in Walton Manor, north of Jericho, an inner suburb of Oxford.

The fountain is on the site of a spring known as Walton Well (aka Bruman's or Brumman's Well) Previously, a stone trough was available before the drinking fountain was erected in 1885 by an Oxford Alderman, William Ward.

At the location of the spring, there is now a drinking fountain in the road, with a plaque dated 1885. It was erected by William Ward, who was Mayor of Oxford in 1851 and 1861. The fountain was designed by the Oxford architect Harry Wilkinson Moore and carved in Portland stone using a Neo-Baroque style by McCulloch of London.

The fountain is inscribed on a metal commemorative plaque:

1885
DRINK AND THINK OF HIM WHO IS THE FOUNTAIN OF LIFE [around the edge]
WITH THE CONSENT OF THE LORDS OF THE MANOR
THIS DRINKING FOUNTAIN IS ERECTED BY
MR. WILLIAM WARD
TO MARK THE SITE OF A CELEBRATED SPRING
KNOWN AS WALTON WELL
ADJACENT TO THE ANCIENT FORDWAY INTO
PORT MEADOW CALLED WALTON FORD

The fountain was Grade II listed in 1972. As of 2025, the Oxford Preservation Trust plans to restore the fountain, following a successful fundraiser.
