= Walton Well Road =

Road in Oxford, England

Coordinates: 51.7622°N 1.2707°W

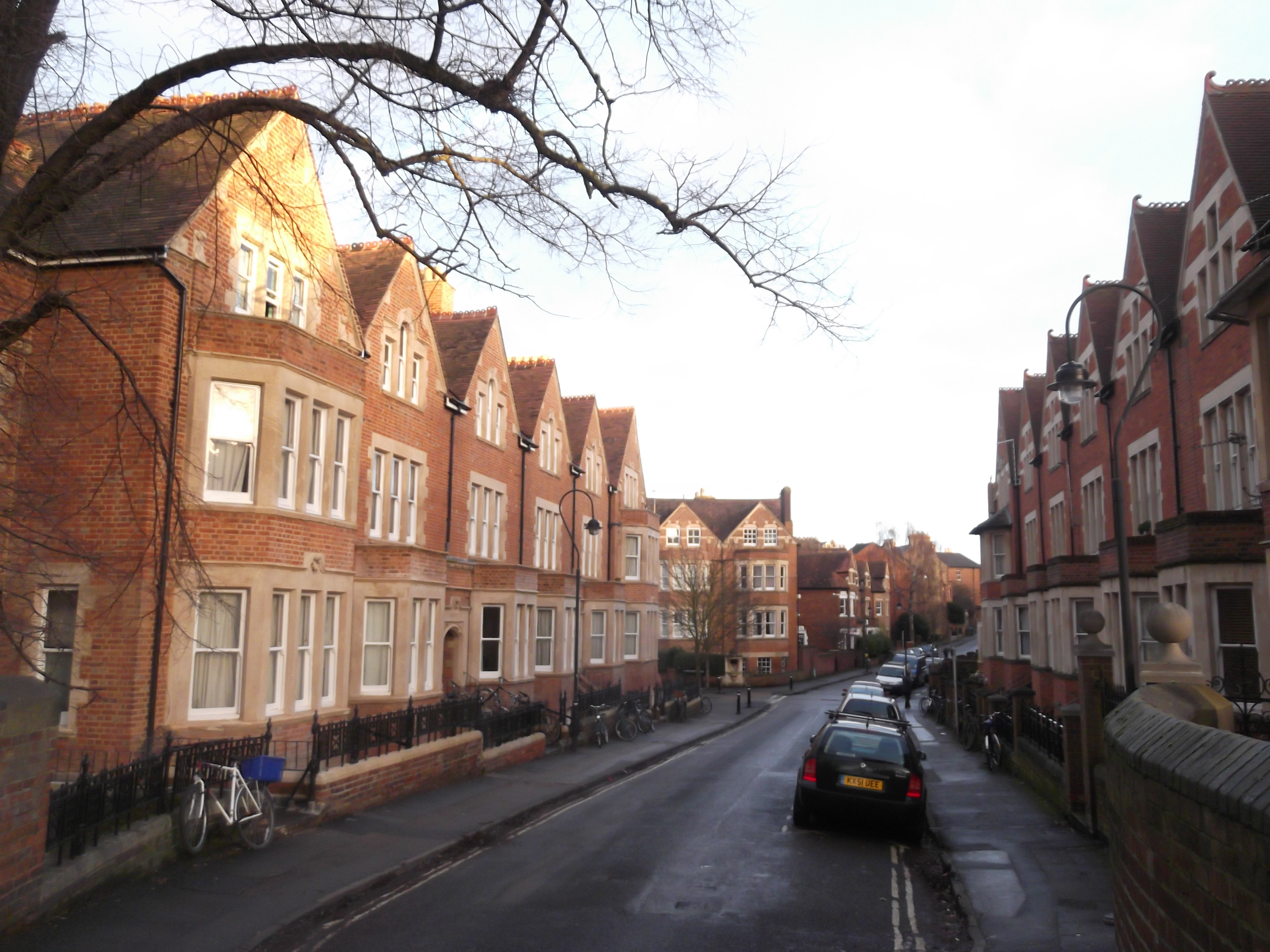
Looking east along Walton Well Road from the canal bridge.

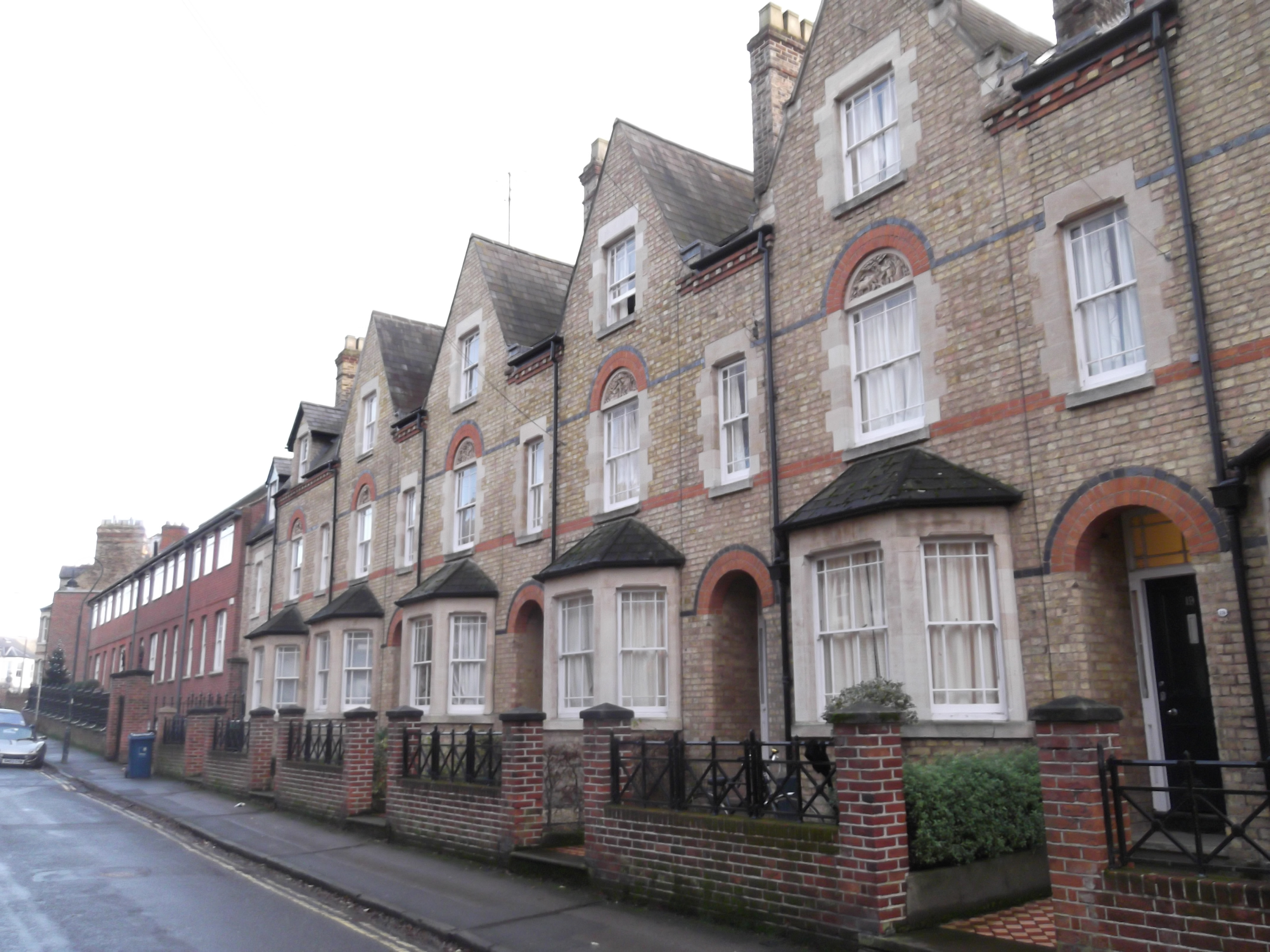
The "Elijah terrace" houses on the south side of Walton Well Road.

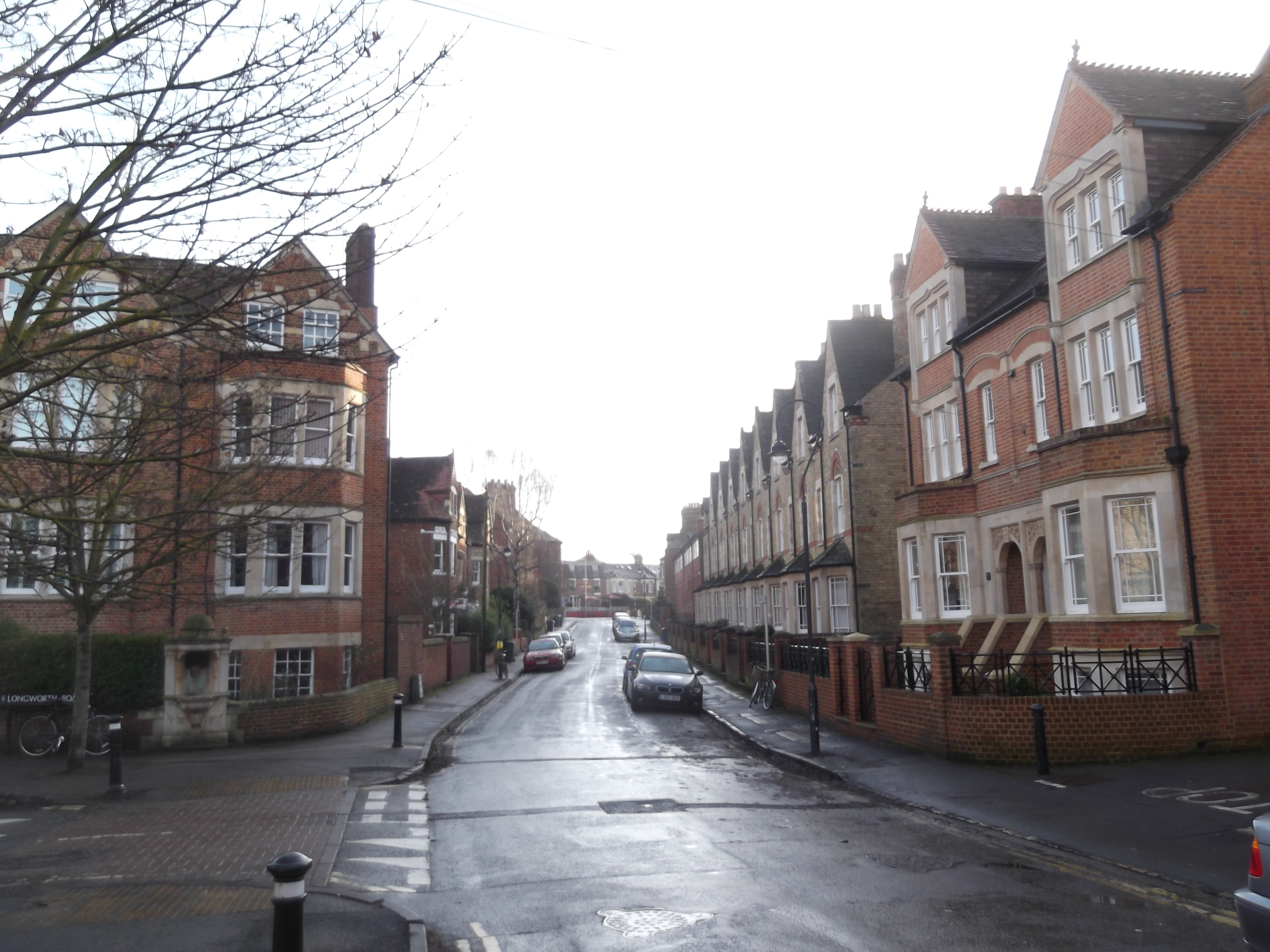
View east along Walton Well Road close to the junction with Southmoor Road and Longworth Road.

Walton Well Road is a road, about 400 metres (a quarter mile) long, near the centre of Oxford, England. It provides a link from central Oxford to Port Meadow.

== Location ==
The road marks the northern edge of the district known as Jericho. At the eastern end is the north end of Walton Street and the south end of Kingston Road at the junction with St Bernard's Road. The western end is reached by a bridge (Walton Well Road Bridge) spanning the Oxford Canal and also the railway line. Here there is access to Port Meadow and the Thames Path, with a car park run by Oxford City Council. About halfway along the road is a junction with Longworth Road and Southmoor Road. To the south, between the canal and the railway line, a new residential road, William Lucy Way, was developed around 2006, on the other side of the Oxford Canal from the former Lucy's Eagle Ironworks site. To the south are modern residential apartments on the site of the Eagle Ironworks, St Sepulchre's Cemetery and beyond that Juxon Street.

The Oxford-Man Institute of Quantitative Finance, a research institute of the University of Oxford established in 2007, is located at Eagle House in Walton Well Road.

== Spring ==
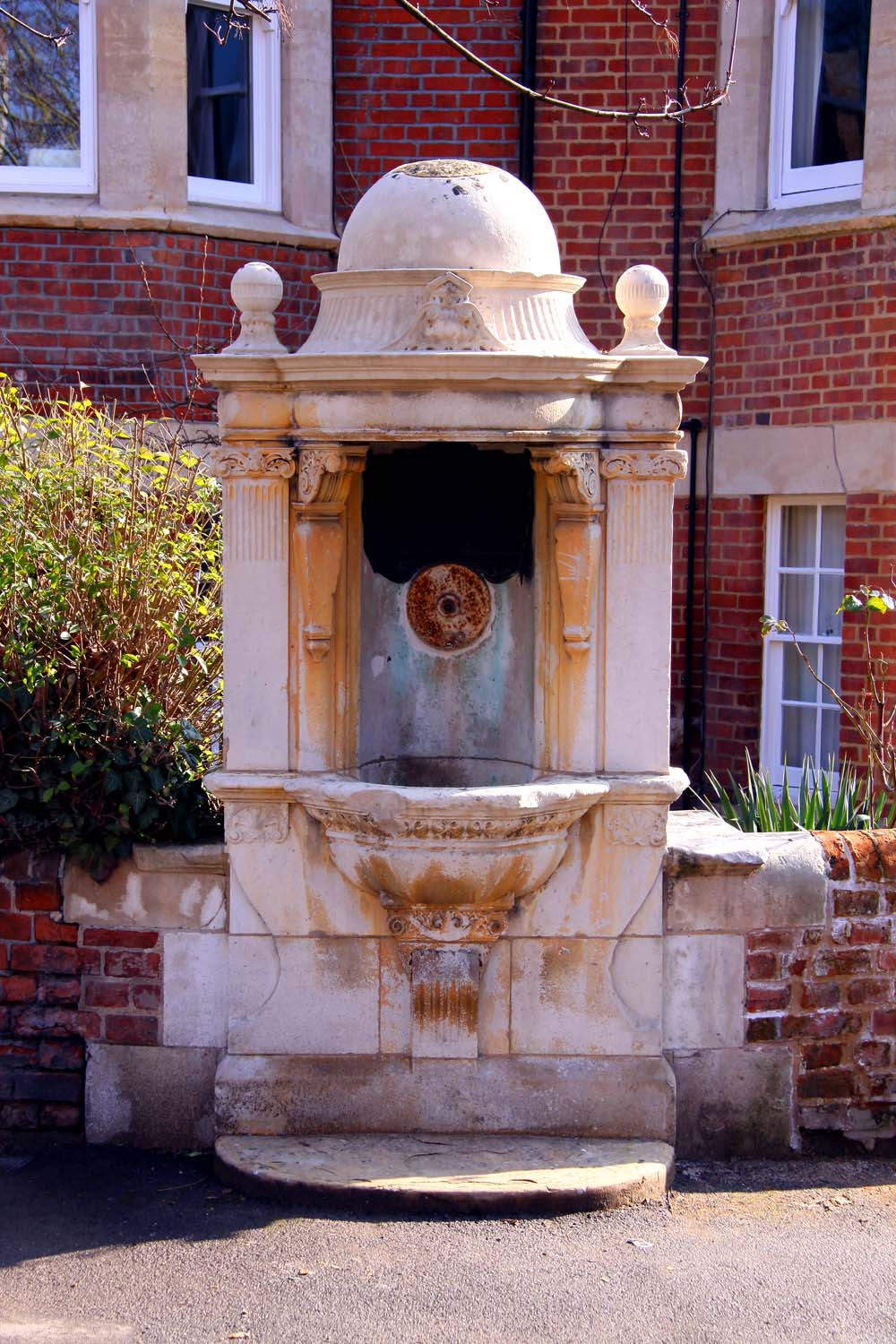
Former drinking fountain on Walton Well Road.

The road is on the site of a spring known as Walton Well (or Bruman's Well) At the location of the spring, there is a drinking fountain in the road, with a plaque dated 1885. It was erected by William Ward, who was Mayor of Oxford in 1851 and 1861. The fountain was designed by the architect Harry Wilkinson Moore and carved in Portland stone by McCulloch of London.

== History ==
The road is important historically because not only did it lead to Port Meadow, but it was also used as a short cut to Binsey, Medley, and Wytham via a ford, called Walton Ford or Walton Well Ford.

The Oxford Canal reached the outskirts of Oxford in 1789, when a coal wharf was opened at Heyfield Hutt, now the site of Hayfield Road to the north of Walton Well Road. The final section into central Oxford was ceremonially opened on 1 January 1790; it needed a bridge to be built over it to maintain the link to Port Meadow. The canal led to the industrialization of the area. In the 19th century, there was a basin and Walton Well hard for boats from the canal at Walton Well Road near the junction with Longworth Road.

On the south side of the street for many years was the historic Eagle Ironworks (aka Lucy's), first established on this site by the Oxford Canal in 1825. The area has now been redeveloped as flats by Berkeley Homes, after an archaeological evaluation. During the archaeological excavation, a 17th-century pit and a possible 19th-century well were discovered to the rear of 25 Walton Well Road.

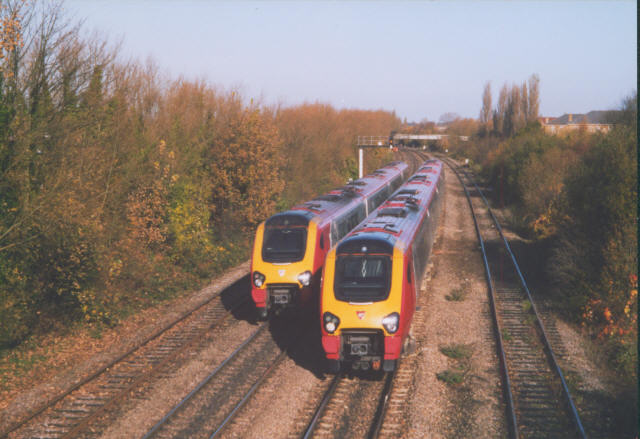
View of the Cherwell Valley line railway north from Walton Well Road.

The Cherwell Valley line railway next to the Oxford Canal was opened in 1850. In this decade, a railway station was planned at Walton Well. A railway line to Brentford in west London was proposed by the Oxford, Worcester and Wolverhampton Railway from this station, across the parish of St Giles, just north of the present Bevington Road and Norham Gardens. The plan never materialized.

The houses on Walton Well Road were built between 1873 and 1897. Many were designed by the architect H. W. Moore (who also designed the drinking fountain in the street mentioned earlier) in the 1880s, some in collaboration with William Wilkinson. No. 2 Walton Well Road, an imposing double-fronted residence, was the house of the ironmaster at the adjacent Lucy's foundry. On the south side of the street is the "Elijah terrace", a row of terraced houses built by Joseph Codgbrook Curtis. These include nine carved panels by the local sculptor Samuel Grafton, based in Cowley Road, Oxford, on aspects of the biblical story of the prophet Elijah in the Old Testament.

During the early 20th century, the poet and short story writer A. E. Coppard (1878–1957) had a clerical post at the Eagle Ironworks in Walton Well Road, as recounted in his autobiography It's Me, O Lord!

Also in Walton Well Road was the Catholic Workers College (at No. 2) from 1921 until 1955, when it moved to Boar's Hill south of Oxford and was renamed Plater College.

Squatters moved into the area during the 1960s and 1970s, and were dubbed 'Waltons'.

Around 2000, The Waterways estate was built on the site of the British Motor Corporation's former Osberton Radiator Factory immediately to the north of Walton Well Road.

== Gallery ==
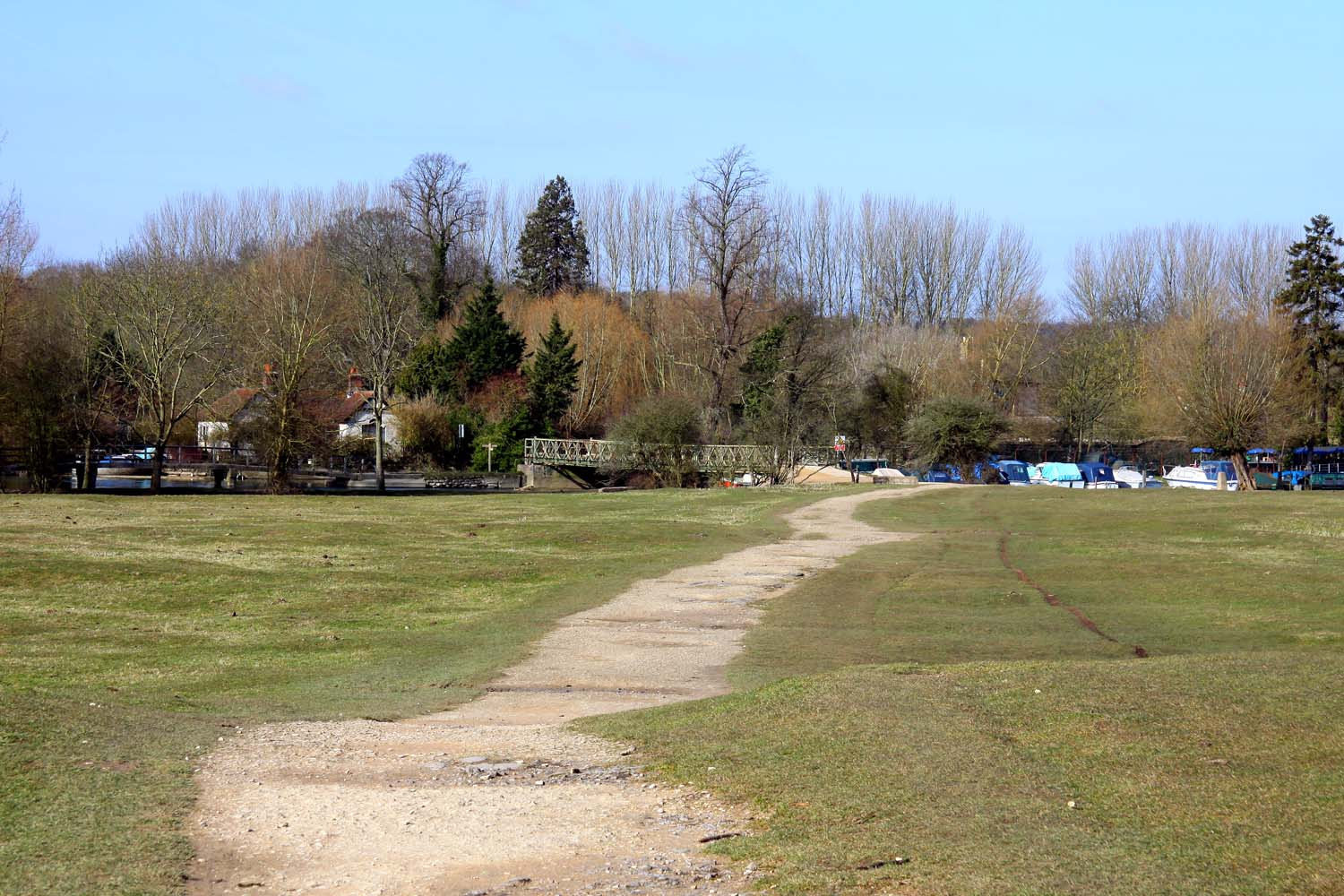
Footpath to the River Thames from Walton Well Road across Port Meadow.

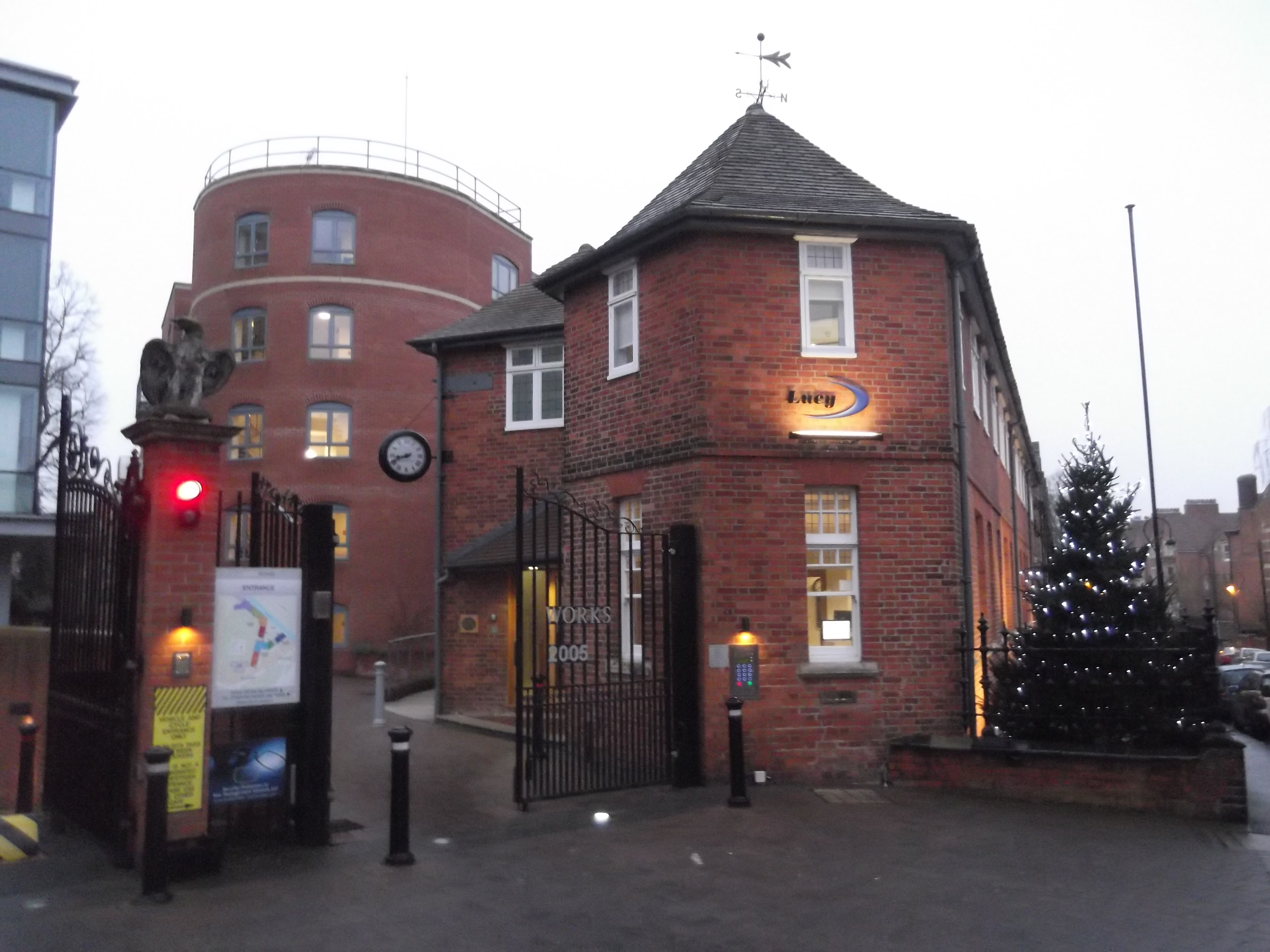
Entrance to Lucy's Ironworks on Walton Well Road.

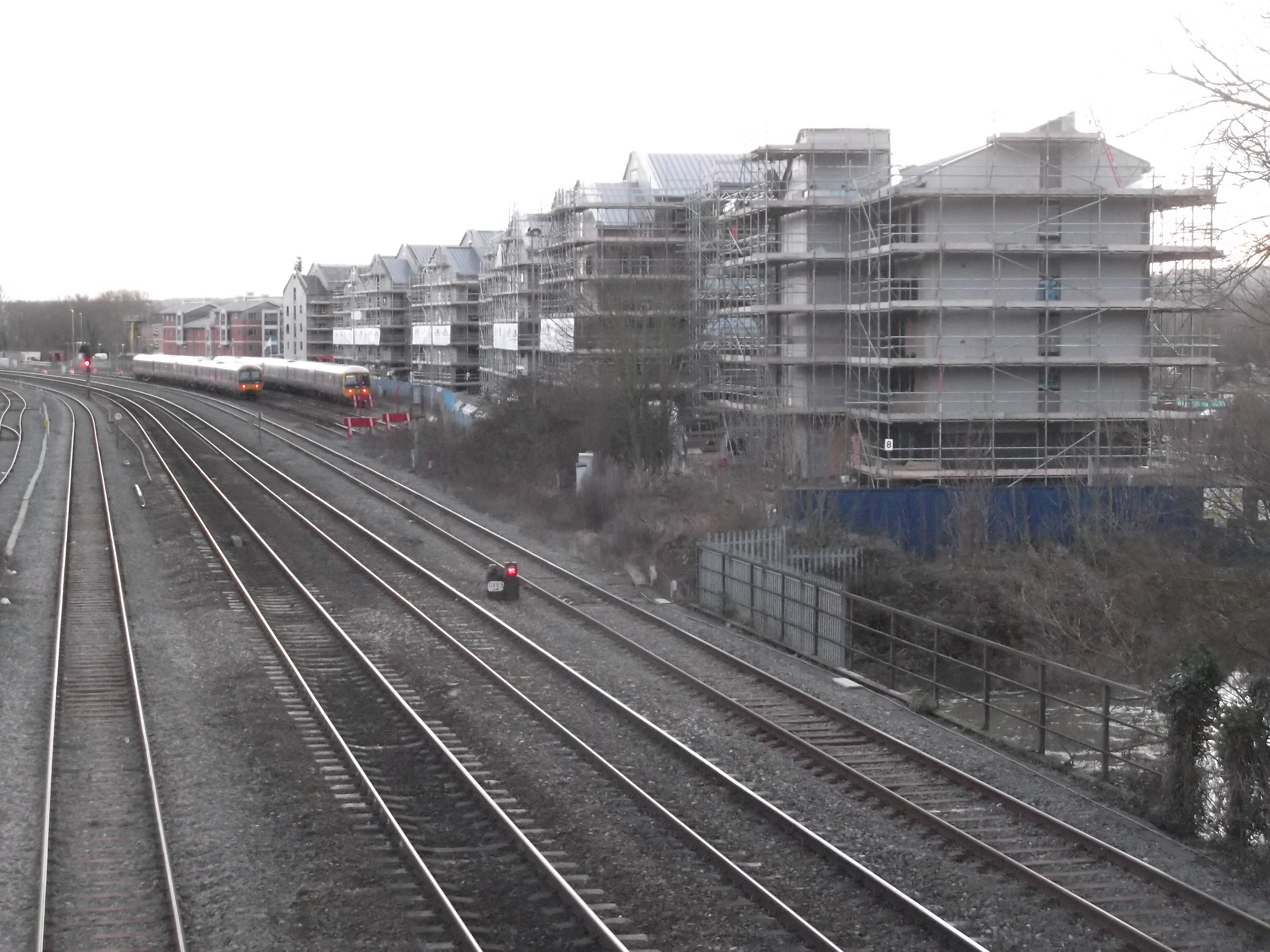
View of Oxford University Castle Mill graduate housing from Walton Well Road railway bridge.

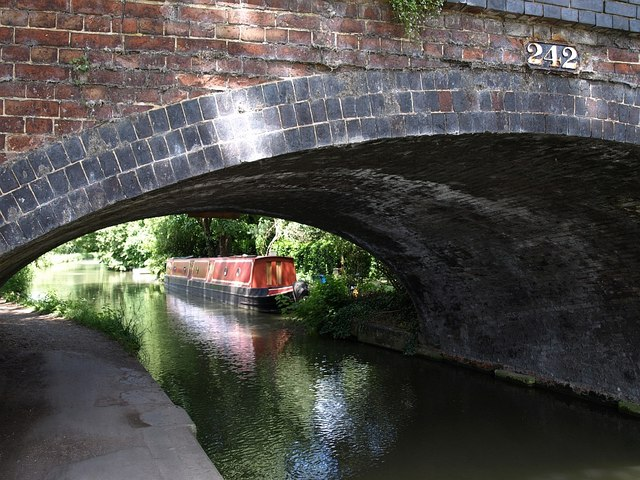
Walton Well Road Bridge over the Oxford Canal.

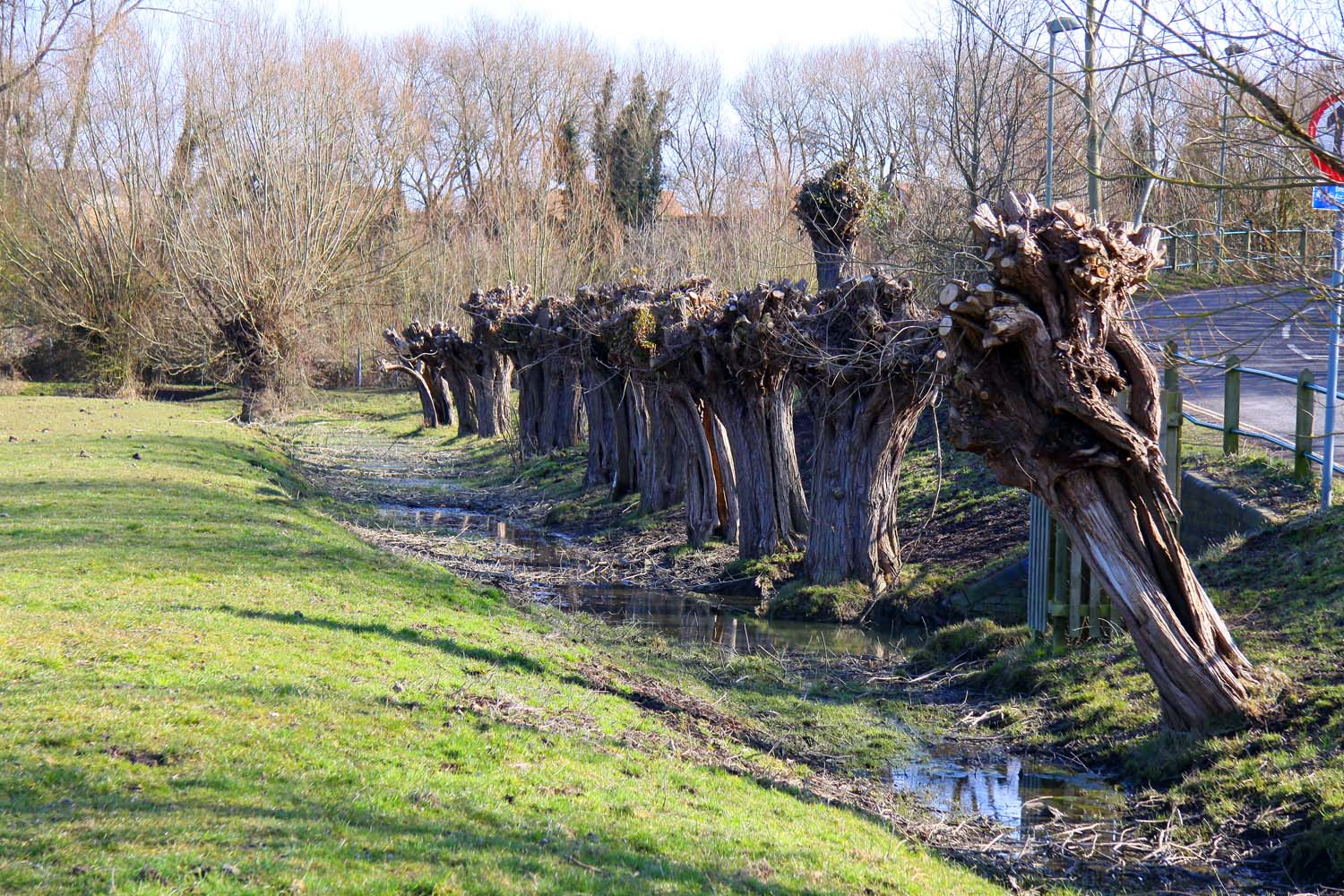
Pollarded willows by Walton Well Road.

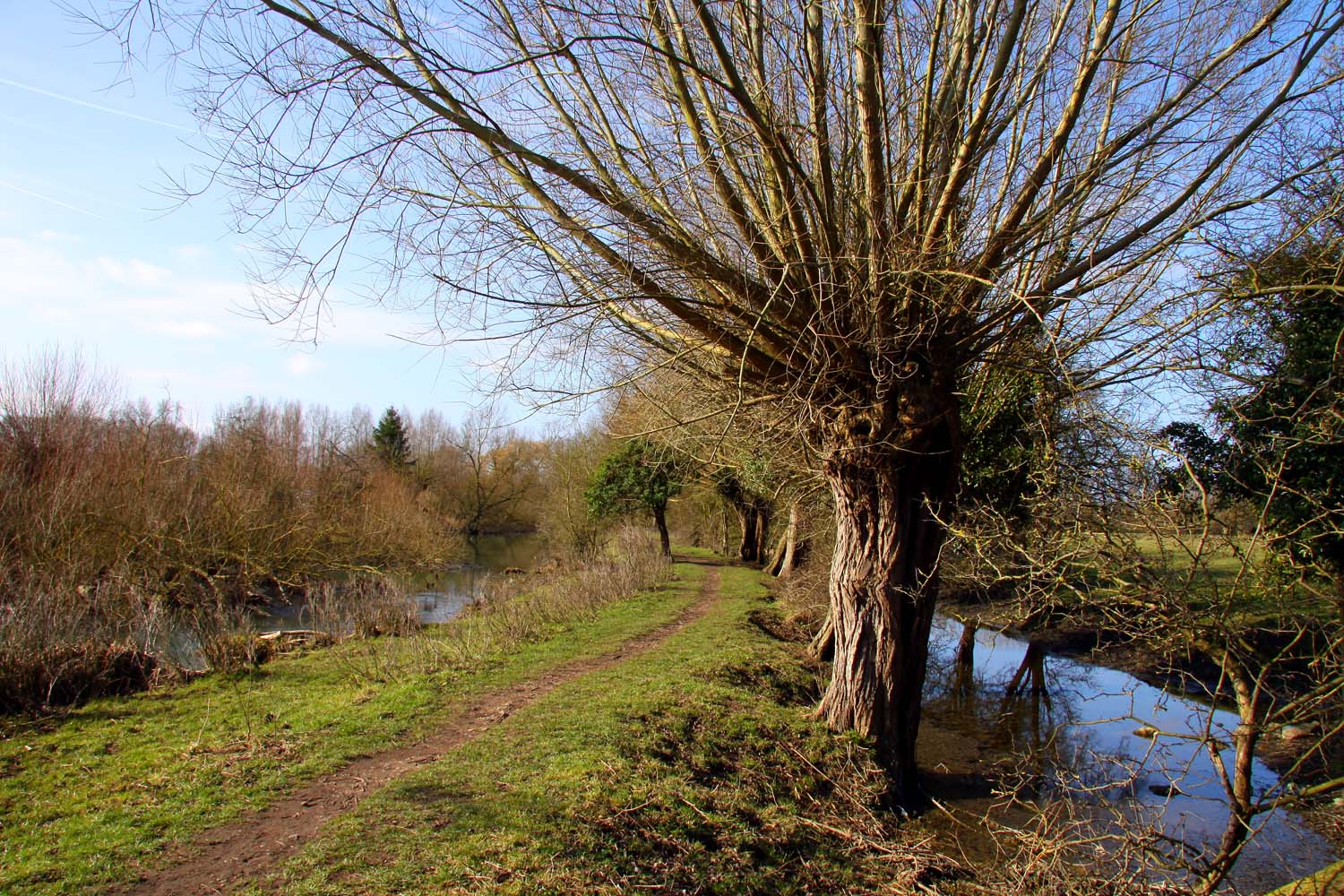
Footpath off Walton Well Road by the willows.

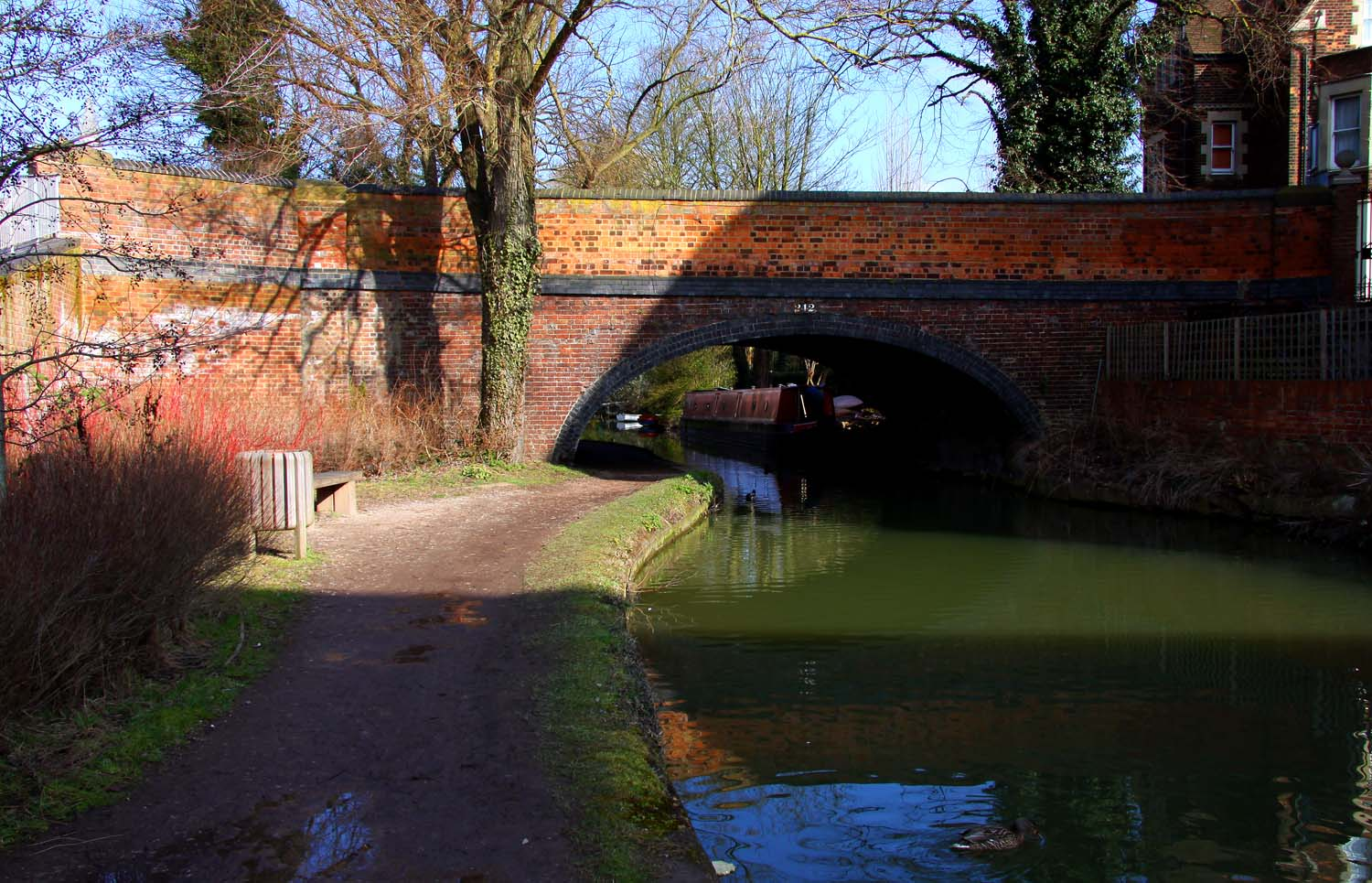
Bridge over the Oxford Canal at Walton Well Road.

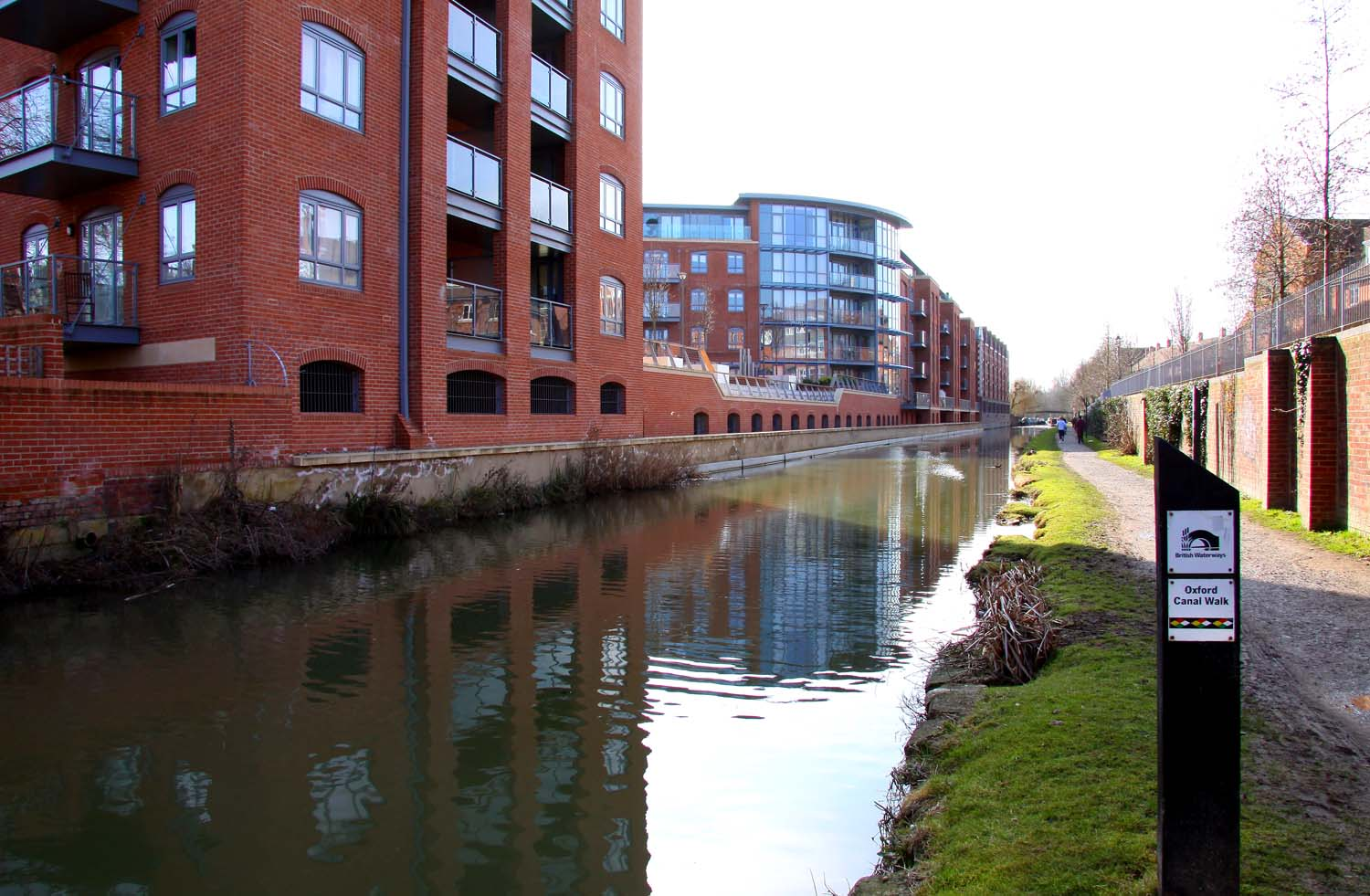
The Oxford Canal south from Walton Well Road.

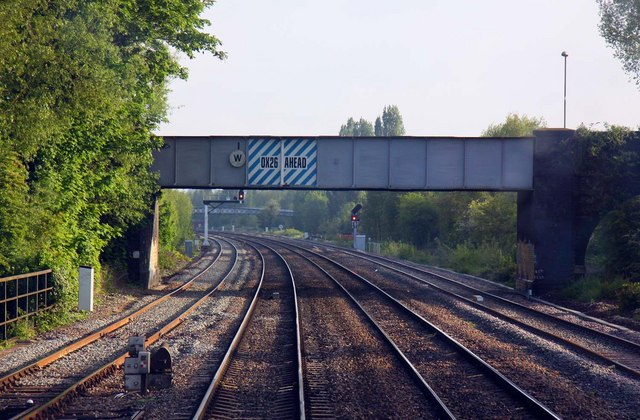
Bridge over the railway at Walton Well Road.

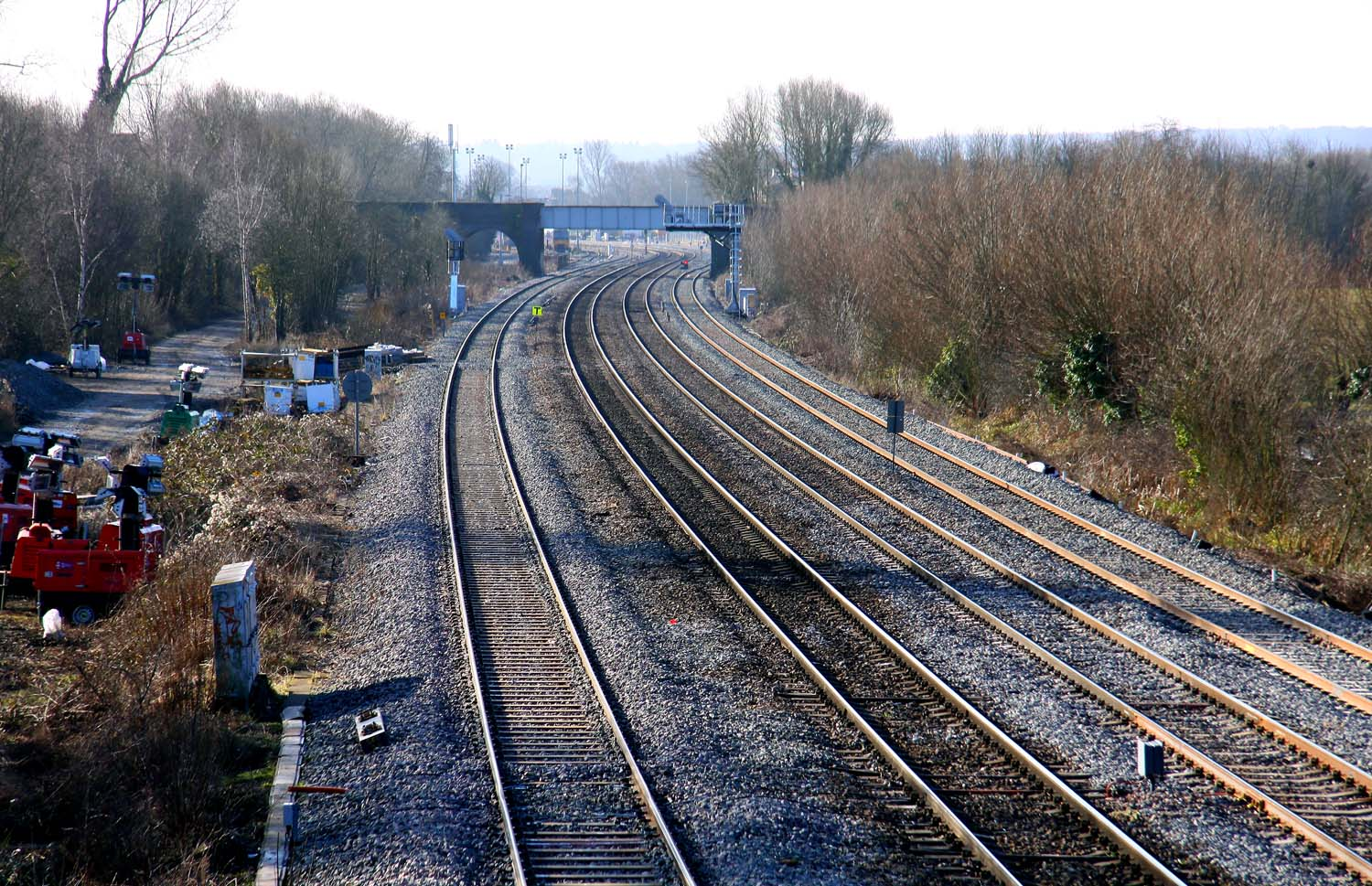
Looking up the railway line to Walton Well Road Bridge.

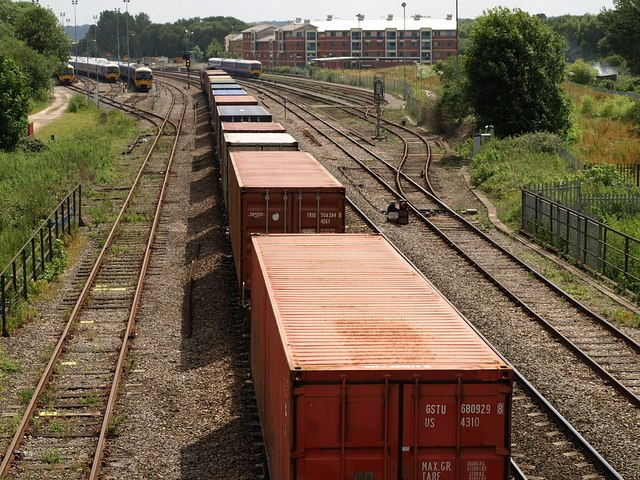
Container train viewed from Walton Well Road Bridge.

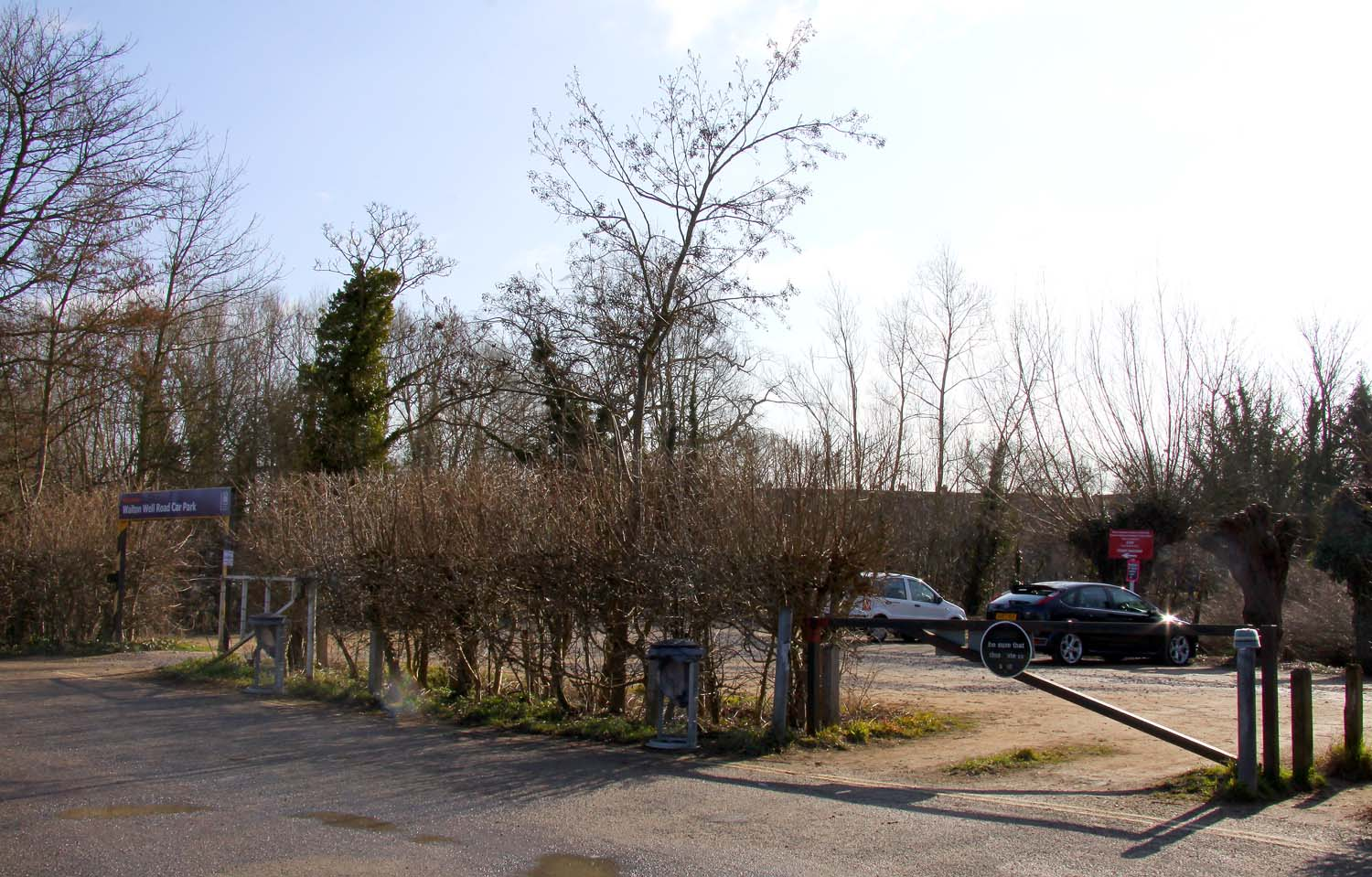
Walton Well Road car park by Port Meadow.

== See also ==
- Aristotle Lane
- Walton Manor
