= The Silent Traveller in Oxford =

Book by Chiang Yee

- First edition
- Author: Chiang Yee
- Language: English
- Genre: Non-fiction
- Publisher: Methuen
- Publication date: 2 November 1944
- Publication place: United Kingdom

The Silent Traveller in Oxford is a 1944 book by the Chinese author Chiang Yee.

It covers his wartime experience in the city of Oxford, England, especially concerning the University of Oxford, after he was forced to move from London in 1940 due to losing his flat during the Blitz in World War II. The book is illustrated by the author with 12 colour paintings and 8 monotone plates showing scenes around Oxford in a Chinese style, together with 70 black and white line drawings.

The book was originally published on 2 November 1944 by Methuen in London. A second edition appeared in April 1945, a third edition in December 1946, and a fourth edition in 1948. It was reprinted by Signal Books in 2003 (ISBN 1-902669-69-X).

This book is part of The Silent Traveller series.

The book was written when Chiang Yee was living at 28 Southmoor Road in Oxford, where he lived during 1940–1955. The house now includes a blue plaque, unveiled on 29 June 2019.

== See also ==
- The Silent Traveller in London (1938)
