= Signal Books =

British book publisher

- Country of origin: United Kingdom
- Headquarters location: Oxford
- Distribution: Macmillan Distribution (UK); Blue Weaver (South Africa); Woodsland (Australia); Interlink Publishing (US)
- Publication types: Books
- Official website: www.signalbooks.co.uk

Signal Books is a British book publisher.

Signal is based in Oxford, England. It specialises in biography, current affairs, history, philosophy, religion, and travel.

== Selected books ==
- The Silent Traveller in London (2001). ISBN 1-902669-41-X.
- The Silent Traveller in Oxford (2003). ISBN 1-902669-69-X.
