= Kingston Road, Oxford =

Road in Oxford, England

Coordinates: 51.765°N 1.269°W

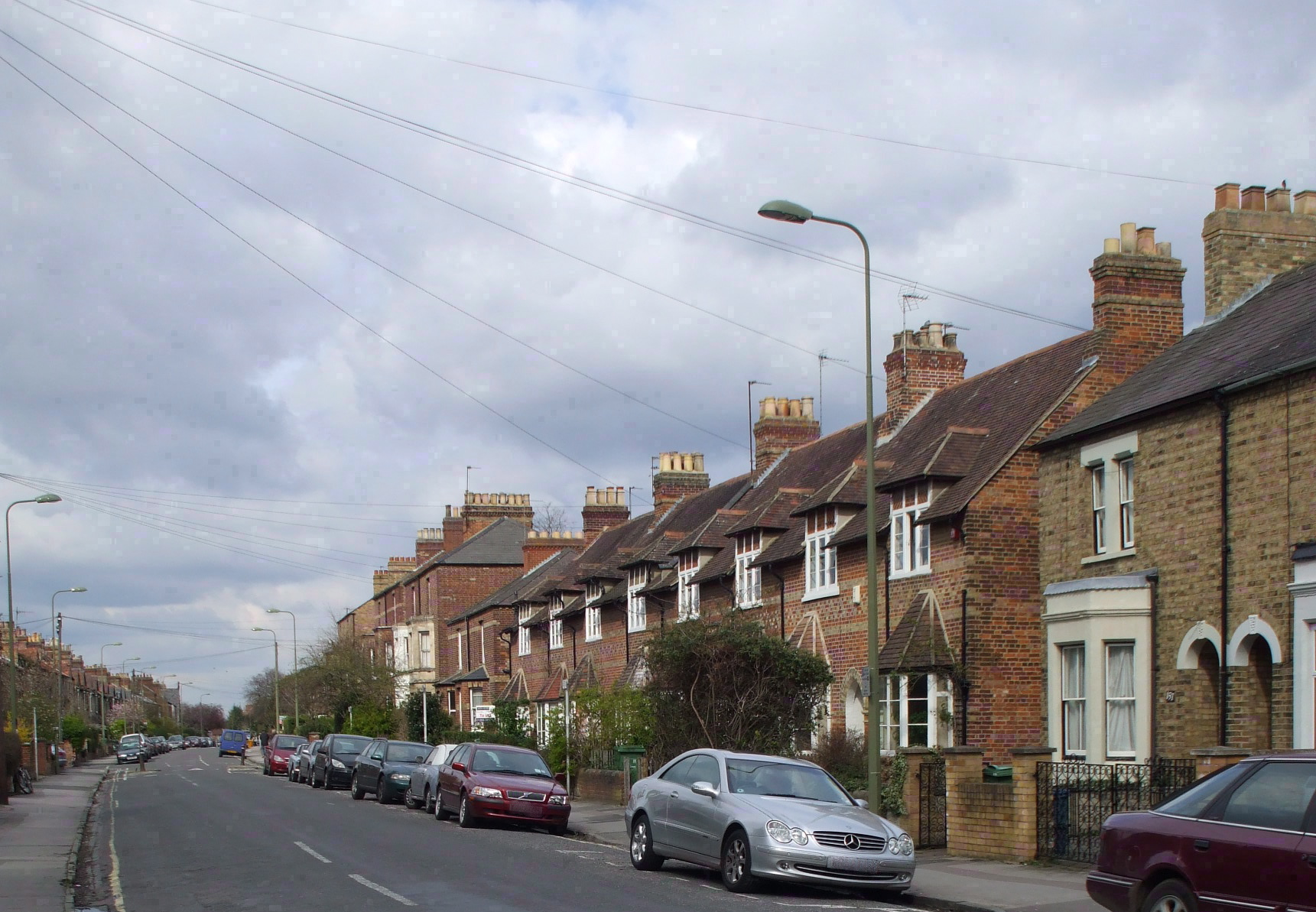
Looking north along Kingston Road.

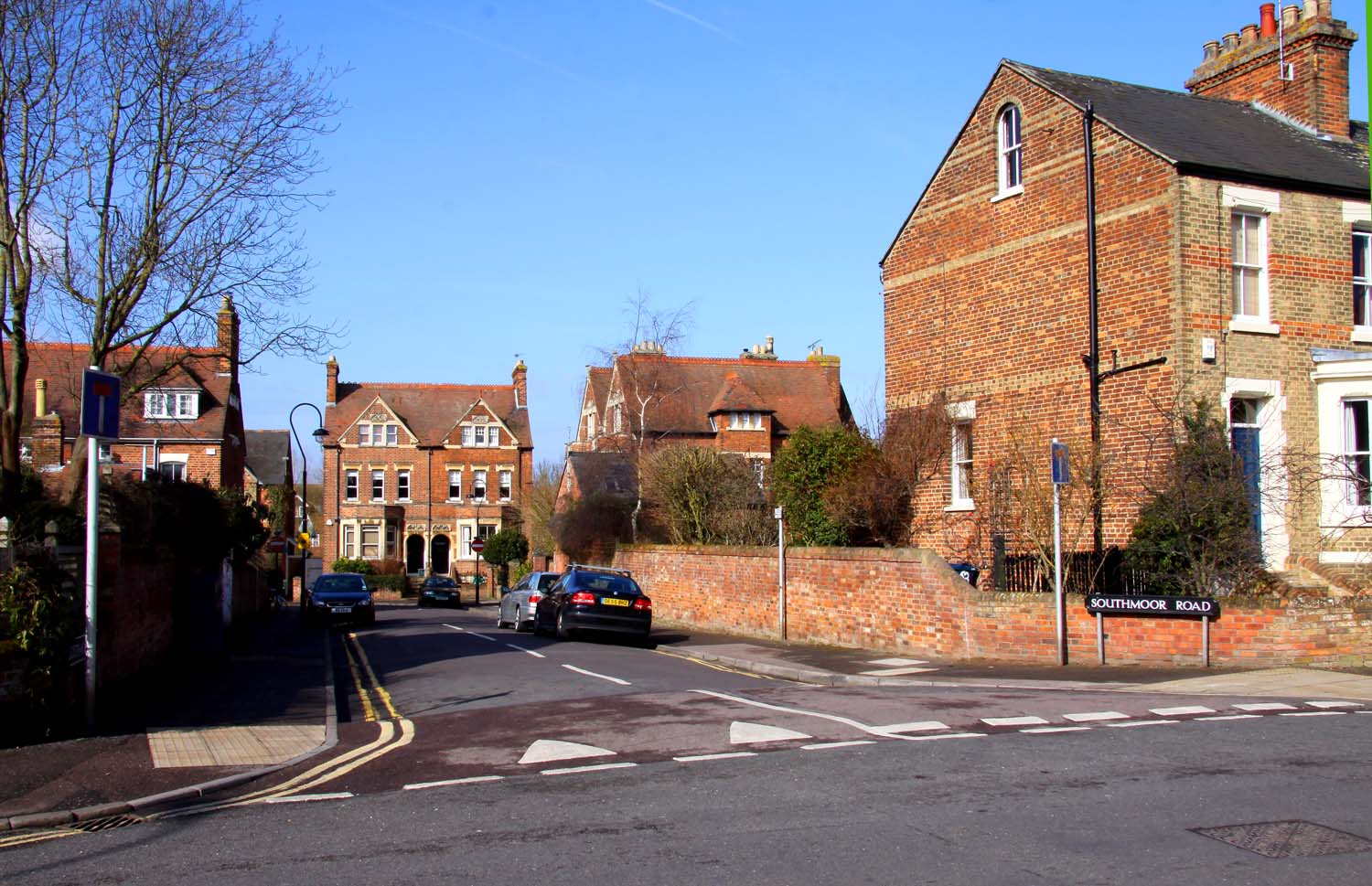
The junction of Southmoor Road on Kingston Road.

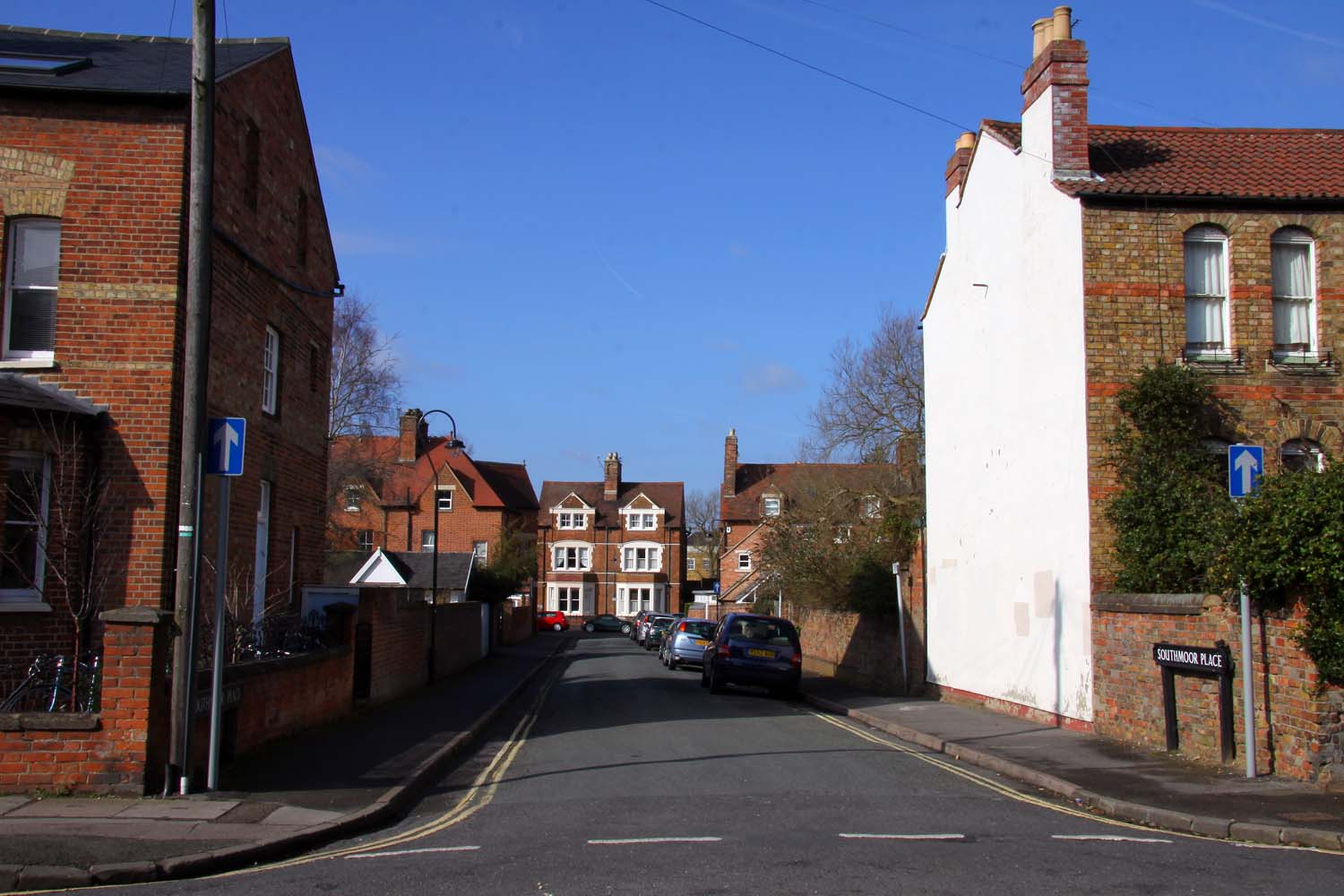
Southmoor Place at its junction with Kingston Road.

Kingston Road is a road in Oxford, England. It continues north from Walton Street, at the junction with Walton Well Road to the west and St Bernard's Road to the east, running parallel with and to the west of Woodstock Road. Kingston Road is the main road in Walton Manor. At the northern end, there is a staggered junction with Aristotle Lane to the west and Polstead Road to the east. The road continues as Hayfield Road. Southmoor Road and Southmoor Place lead off Kingston Road to the west.

The area was formerly part of the estate of St John's College, Oxford. Kingston Road is named after the village of Kingston Bagpuize, whose Church of England parish church is under the patronage of the college.

Many of the houses in Kingston Road are terraced, created as part of the generally grander North Oxford estate to the east. Numbers 114–138, 149–156 and 159–164 are terraces built in 1870–75 by the local architect C.C. Rolfe. All are Grade II listed buildings.

In the Victorian era the families in Kingston Road were more often from the local area than those in the rest of the estate. In 1881, 40.7% of the families were artisans.
