= The Silent Traveller in London =

Book by Chiang Yee

- Author: Chiang Yee
- Language: English
- Series: The Silent Traveller series
- Genre: Non-fiction
- Publisher: Country Life, Signal Books
- Publication date: 1938
- Publication place: United Kingdom

The Silent Traveller in London (simplified Chinese: 《伦敦画记》; traditional Chinese: 《倫敦畫記》; pinyin: “Lúndūn huàjì” (“London Pictorial”)) is a 1938 book by the Chinese author Chiang Yee.

It covers his pre-war experience in London, the capital city of England and the United Kingdom. Chiang Yee's account was one of the first widely available books written by a Chinese author in English. He was fascinated by such social conventions as afternoon tea and discussing the weather. Comparing London with China Chiang Yee draws parallels and contrasts:

"I am bound to look at things from a different angle, but I have never agreed with people who hold that the various nationalities differ greatly from each other. They may be different superficially, but they eat, drink, sleep, dress, and shelter themselves from the wind and rain in the same way."

The book is illustrated by the author with colour and monochrome plates in a Chinese style.

The book was originally published by Country Life in London. Second and third impressions were published in 1938 and a fourth impression was published in 1940. It was reprinted by Signal Books in 2001 (ISBN 1-902669-41-X).

This book is part of The Silent Traveller series. In 1940, he moved from London to Oxford due to the loss of his flat during the Blitz in World War II, and subsequently wrote The Silent Traveller in Oxford in 1944.
