= William Ward (mayor) =

Mayor of Oxford, England (1807–1889)

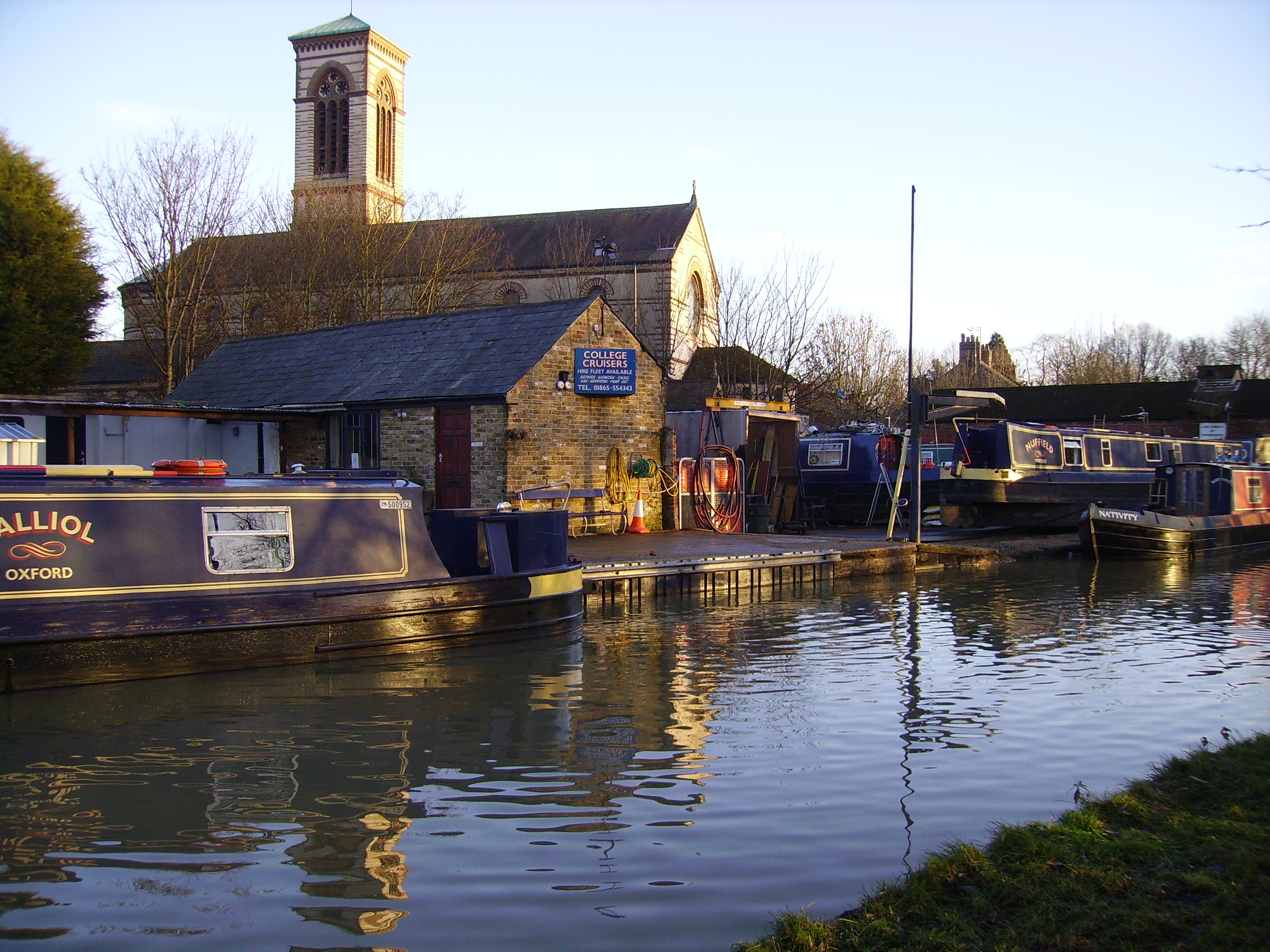
A view of the Oxford Canal in Jericho, Oxford, where William Ward undertook his coal business, with St Barnabas' Church, built on land given by Ward

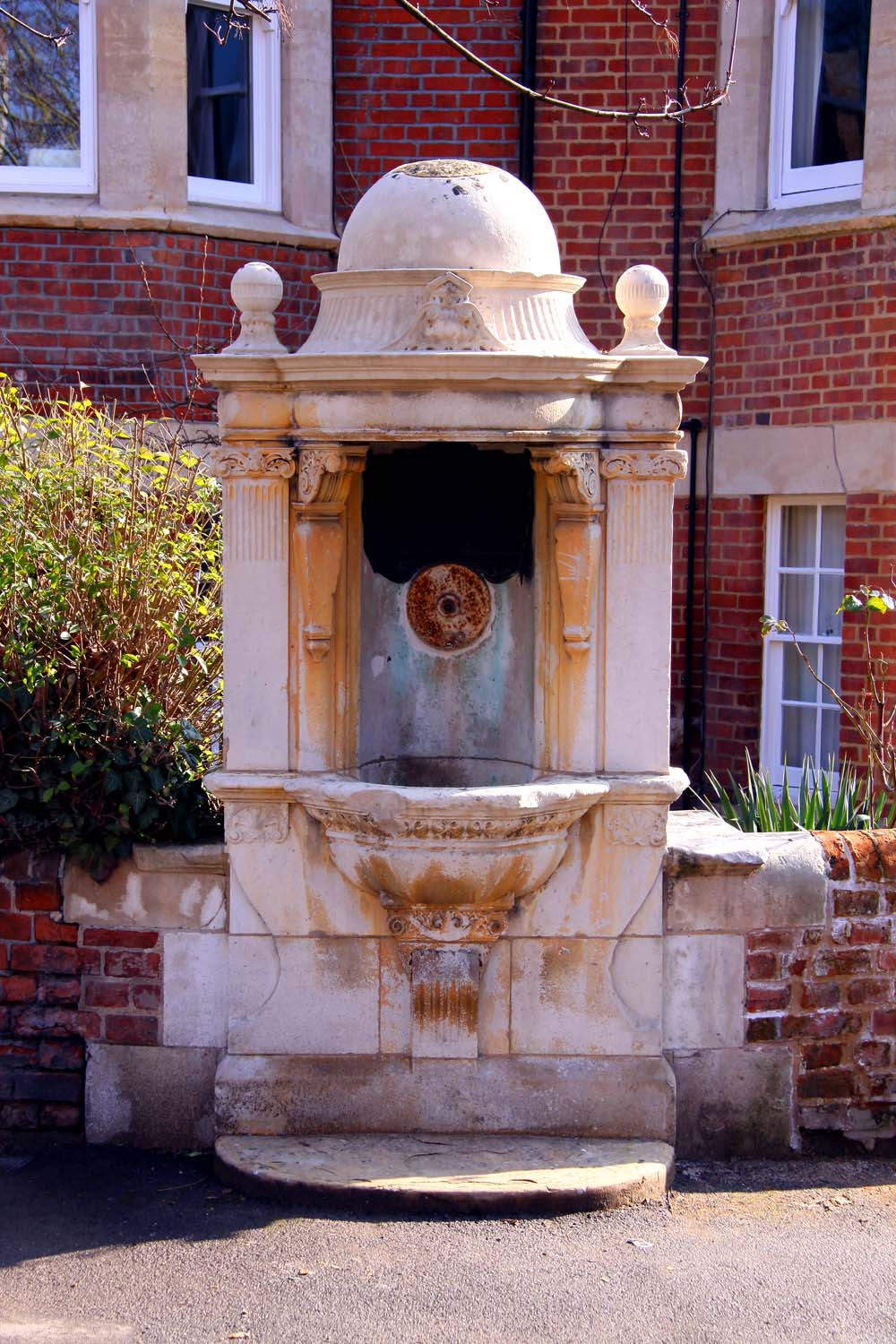
The Walton Well Drinking Fountain, erected by Ward in 1885

William Ward (1807 – 20 July 1889) was a Victorian Mayor of the city of Oxford, in England.

William Ward was born in Oxford, the son of Henry Ward (1780–1852), who himself was the son of Abraham Ward from Warwickshire. His mother was Sarah Ward (1779–1858), the daughter of Abraham Ward (1739–1817) from Stafford and Oxford.

Ward became a coal merchant as his father had been before him. His business was based at the canal wharf on the Oxford Canal in Jericho, Oxford.

William Ward married Harriet Timmis on 20 July 1830. They lived at the junction of St John Street and Alfred Street (now Pusey Street) in central Oxford. The house is now 22 St John Street. Eleven children were born to them in this house between 1832 and 1847, all baptised at St Giles' Church nearby.

Ward was Mayor of Oxford in 1851–2 and again in 1861–2.

In 1868, Ward was elected the first President of the newly formed Oxford Constitutional Association. He became known as the father of modern Conservatism in Oxford.

Ward erected a drinking fountain on the site of the spring in Walton Well Road, with a plaque dated 1885.

Ward died on 20 July 1889, aged 82 and was buried in the family vault at St Mary Magdalen's Church. His wife died on 26 July 1876, aged 67 and was buried in the same church.
