= Walton Manor =

Residential suburb in Oxford, England

Coordinates: 51.764°N 1.267°W

- Location within Oxfordshire
- OS grid reference: SP505075
- Civil parish: unparished
- District: Oxford
- Shire county: Oxfordshire
- Region: South East
- Country: England
- Sovereign state: United Kingdom
- Post town: Oxford
- Postcode district: OX2
- Dialling code: 01865
- Police: Thames Valley
- Fire: Oxfordshire
- Ambulance: South Central
- UK Parliament: Oxford West and Abingdon
- Website: Oxford City Council

Walton Manor is a residential suburb in Oxford, England. It is north of Jericho and the Radcliffe Observatory Quarter and forms part of North Oxford. The street layout and many of the area's buildings date from the mid-19th century. It was developed on land belonging to St John's College, Oxford.

In 1975, Walton Manor was designated as a Conservation Area under the Town and Country Planning Act 1971. The conservation area is bounded by Leckford Road on the north, Woodstock Road on the east, the properties fronting Observatory Street to the south, and Kingston Road and Walton Street to the west. The main road north–south through the area is Kingston Road, which continues southwards as Walton Street towards the city centre. Walton Manor has a residents' association.

Walton Manor Farm used to be on the site of St Sepulchre's Cemetery, in Jericho, just south of the Eagle Ironworks on Walton Well Road.

== See also ==
- Norham Manor to the east
- Walton Well

== Sources and further reading ==
- Chance, Eleanor; Colvin, Christina; Cooper, Janet; Day, C.J.; Hassall, T.G.; Selwyn, Nesta (1979). Crossley, Alan; Elrington, C.R. (eds.). Victoria County History: A History of the County of Oxford, Volume 4.
- Sherwood, Jennifer; Pevsner, Nikolaus (1974). The Buildings of England: Oxfordshire. Harmondsworth: Penguin Books. pp. 321–322. ISBN 0-14-071045-0.
- Tyack, Geoffrey (1998). Oxford An Architectural Guide. Oxford & New York: Oxford University Press. pp. 234–235. ISBN 0-19-817423-3.
