= Chiang Yee =

Chinese author, painter, illustrator, calligrapher, poet (1903–1977)

Chiang Yee (simplified Chinese: 蒋彝; traditional Chinese: 蔣彝; pinyin: Jiǎng Yí; Wade–Giles: Chiang I; 19 May 1903 – 26 October 1977), self-styled as "The Silent Traveller" (哑行者), was a Chinese poet, author, painter and calligrapher. The success of The Silent Traveller: A Chinese Artist in Lakeland (1937) was followed by a series of books in the same vein, all of which he illustrated himself. He was a nominee for the 1973 Nobel Prize in Literature. Chiang Yee came up with the famous Chinese translation for Coca-Cola (可口可乐, pinyin: "Ke Kou Ke Le", meaning "palatable and pleasurable") in 1935. He submitted the winning entry while living in England after answering a corporate naming competition held by The Coca-Cola Company.

== 1903–1933: China ==
Chiang Yee was born in Jiujiang, China, on a day variously recorded as 19 May or 14 June. His father was a painter. His mother died when he was five.

Chiang Yee married Tseng Yun in 1924, with whom he was to have four children. In 1925 he graduated from Nanjing University (then named National Southeastern University), one of the world's oldest institutions of learning but also relaunched in 1920 as one of China's earlier modern universities; his degree was in chemistry. He served for over a year in the National Revolutionary Army during the Second Sino-Japanese War, then taught chemistry in middle schools, lectured at National Chengchi University, and worked as assistant editor of a Hangzhou newspaper. He subsequently served as magistrate of three counties (Jiujang in Jiangxi, and Dangtu and Wuhu in Anhui). Unhappy with the situation in China then (see Nanjing decade), he departed for England in 1933, to study for an MSc in economics at the London School of Economics, focusing on English local government, leaving wife and family behind. He did not complete the MSc.

== 1933–1955: England ==
From 1935 to 1938 Chiang taught Chinese at the School of Oriental Studies (now School of Oriental and African Studies), University of London, and 1938 to 1940 worked at the Wellcome Museum of Anatomy and Pathology. During this period, he wrote and illustrated a well-received series of books entitled The Silent Traveller in..... His first was The Silent Traveller: a Chinese Artist in Lakeland, written from a journal of a fortnight in the English Lake District in August 1936). Others followed: The Silent Traveller in London, the Yorkshire Dales, and Oxford. Despite paper shortages and rationing, these books were kept in print. He wrote The Silent Traveller in Wartime, and, after World War II ended, the series gradually ventured further afield, to Edinburgh, Dublin, Paris, New York, San Francisco, and Boston, concluding in 1972 with Japan. He lived for a time with fellow expatriates Hsiung Shih-I, author of a West End hit, and Dymia Hsiung, the first Chinese woman to write a fictionalised autobiography in English.

After publication of the Silent Traveller books, Chiang became friends with a number of British intellectuals and people involved in the arts. Ninette de Valois commissioned him to design the costumes for a performance of the ballet The Birds.

People he knew in Britain included Dorothea Hosie, Basil Gray, Noel Carrington, John Laviers Wheatley, Elizabeth Longford, Gilbert Murray and Strickland Gibson.

=== Commentary on his writing: 1933–1955 ===
The books bring a fresh 'sideways look' to places perhaps unfamiliar at the time to a Chinese national: the author was struck by things the locals might not notice, such as beards, or the fact that the so-called Lion's Haunch on Arthur's Seat in Edinburgh is actually far more like a sleeping elephant. In his wartime books, Chiang Yee made it plain that he was fervently opposed to Nazism. His writings exude a feeling of positive curiosity. Some of his books have been re-issued in recent decades, at times with fresh introductions. Godfrey Hodgson noted Chiang Yee's irony and his comments on British racism. In The Silent Traveller in Oxford (1944), Chiang points out that Chinese people are not allowed to enter Trinity College, Oxford. He describes feeling homesick for China. He writes about the natural world, particularly flowers.

== 1955–1975: United States ==
After living for some years in a small flat in London and being obliged, during the war, neither to travel nor to take part in the hostilities, on account of being classed as an 'alien', Chiang moved to the United States in 1955. He became a lecturer (and ultimately Emeritus Professor of Chinese) at Columbia University from 1955 to 1957, with an interlude in 1958 and 1959 during which he was Emerson Fellow in Poetry at Harvard University. He became a naturalized citizen in 1966. He illustrated all his books, including several for children, and he wrote a standard work on Chinese calligraphy.

== 1975–1977: China ==
Chiang died in his seventies in China after spending over forty years away from his homeland, on a day variously recorded as 7 or 26 October 1977. His tomb is on the slopes of Mount Lu nearby his home town Jiujiang.

== Commemoration ==
In June 2019, 40 years after Chiang's death, a blue plaque was unveiled at 28 Southmoor Road, Oxford where he rented two rooms from 1940 to 1955. The plaque honours his contribution to British and Chinese life. He is thought to be only the third Chinese person to receive a blue plaque, i.e. a memorial created by English Heritage. (Writer Lao She has a blue plaque in Notting Hill and Sun Yat-sen, the first president of the Republic of China, is commemorated in the village of Cottered in Hertfordshire.)

== Chiang Yee's works ==
=== The Silent Traveller series ===
- The Silent Traveller: A Chinese Artist in Lakeland (London: Country Life, 1937 reprinted Mercat, 2004), ISBN 1-84183-067-4. Six impressions by 1949.
- The Silent Traveller in London (London: Country Life, 1938 reprinted Signal, 2001), six impressions by 1945.
- The Silent Traveller in War Time (London: Country Life, 1939).
- The Silent Traveller in the Yorkshire Dales (London: Methuen 1941), three editions by 1942. Not known if reprinted.
- The Silent Traveller in Oxford (London: Methuen, 1944, reprinted Signal, 2003), four editions by 1948.
- The Silent Traveller in Edinburgh (London: Methuen, 1948, reprinted Mercat, 2003). ISBN 1-84183-048-8.
- The Silent Traveller in New York (London: Methuen, 1950).
- The Silent Traveller in Dublin (London: Methuen, 1953).
- The Silent Traveller in Paris (London: Methuen, 1956; New York: W. W. Norton, 1956).
- The Silent Traveller in Boston (New York: W. W. Norton, 1959).
- The Silent Traveller in San Francisco (New York: W. W. Norton, 1963). ISBN 0-393-08422-1.
- The Silent Traveller in Japan (New York: W. W. Norton, 1972). ISBN 0-393-08642-9.

=== Poetry ===
- The Silent Traveller’s Hiong Kong Zhuzhi Poems (1972).

=== China: childhood and return ===
- A Chinese Childhood (London: Methuen, 1940 reprinted John Day, 1953).
- China Revisited: After Forty-two Years (New York: W.W. Norton, 1977). ISBN 0-393-08791-3.

=== Painting and calligraphy ===
- The Chinese Eye: An Interpretation of Chinese Painting, (London: Methuen, 1935).
- Chinese Calligraphy (London: Methuen, 1955).
- Chinese Calligraphy: An Introduction to Its Aesthetic and Technique (Harvard: University Press, 1973, 3rd edition). ISBN 0-674-12225-9.

=== Other works ===
- Chin-Pao and the Giant Pandas (London: Country Life, 1939).
- Chinpao at the Zoo (London: Methuen, 1941).
- The Men of the Burma Road (London: Methuen, 1942).
- Dabbitse (London: Transatlantic Arts, 1944), for children.
- Yebbin: a Guest from the Wild (London: Methuen, 1947). ISBN 0-908240-87-2.
- The Story of Ming (London: Puffin, c. 1945).
- Lo Cheng: The Boy Who Wouldn′t Keep Still (London: Puffin, c. 1945).
- Some Chinese Words to be learnt without a teacher (privately published; date unknown).

=== Illustrated only ===
- Innes Herdan (tr.), 300 Tang Poems (Far East Book Co., 2000), illustrated by Chiang Yee. ISBN 957-612-471-9,
- Birds and Beasts, Chiang Yee (Country Life, 1939), a portfolio of illustrations of birds and animals.
- The Pool of Chien Lung; by Lady Hosie, 1944 (frontispiece).
- Chinese Cookery; by M. P. Lee – decorations (i.e., illustrations) by Chiang Yee.

An exhibition of original paintings and drawings by Chiang Yee – The silent traveller: Chiang Yee in Britain 1933-55 – was displayed at the Victoria and Albert Museum, 23 April to 9 November 2012.
