= Granville Ramage =

British diplomat (1919–2011)

Granville Ramage CMG

British Consul-General in Boston
- In office 1975–1977
- Preceded by: Alastair Maitland
- Succeeded by: Sir Giles Bullard

British Ambassador to People's Democratic Republic of Yemen (South Yemen)
- In office 1972–1975
- Preceded by: Arthur Kellas
- Succeeded by: Peter Keegan Williams

British High Commissioner to the Gambia
- In office 1968–1971
- Preceded by: George Edmond Crombie
- Succeeded by: James Roland Walter Parker

Personal details
- Born: 19 November 1919
- Died: 4 March 2011 (aged 91)
- Children: 3
- Education: University of Glasgow
- Occupation: Diplomat

James Granville William Ramage (19 November 1919 – 4 March 2011) was a British diplomat who served as high commissioner to the Gambia from 1968 to 1971 and ambassador to People's Democratic Republic of Yemen (South Yemen) from 1972 to 1975.

== Early life and education ==
Ramage was born on 19 November 1919, the son of Rev. George Granville Ramage and Helen Marion (née Middlemass). He was educated at the Glasgow Academy and University of Glasgow. His aunt was Elinore Almond Ramage, wife of British-Australian naturalist Albert Kitson.

== Career ==
Ramage served with British Armed Forces during World War II, and was mentioned in despatches. In 1947, he joined the Foreign Service, and was seconded to the Commonwealth Relations Office at Bombay. He was also promoted second secretary that year. In 1950, he was transferred to the Foreign Office and in the following year promoted to first secretary. He was then posted to Manila as first secretary and consul and acted as chargé d’affaires there in 1953, 1954 and 1955. After spending two years at the Foreign Office, he served as consul at Atlanta from 1958 to 1962.

After returning to the Foreign Office, he was appointed consul-general at Tangier, where he served from 1963 to 1967. From 1968 to 1971, he was high commissioner in The Gambia and from 1972 to 1975, ambassador to the People’s Democratic Republic of Yemen (South Yemen). In 1975, he was appointed consul general at Boston, Massachusetts, and remained in the post until his retirement in 1977.

== Personal life and death ==
Ramage married Eileen Mary Smith in 1947 and they had a son and two daughters.

Ramage died on 4 March 2011.

== Honours ==
Ramage was appointed Companion of the Order of St Michael and St George (CMG) in the 1975 Birthday Honours.

== See also ==
- The Gambia–United Kingdom relations
- Yemen–United Kingdom relations

Diplomatic posts
Preceded by George Edmond Crombie	British High Commissioner to the Gambia; 1968–1971	Succeeded by James Roland Walter Parker
Preceded by Arthur Kellas	British Ambassador to People's Democratic Republic of Yemen (South Yemen); 1972–1975	Succeeded by Peter Keegan Williams
Preceded by Alastair Maitland	British Consul-General in Boston; 1975–1977	Succeeded by Sir Giles Bullard
