= Meadowhead School =

Secondary School in Sheffield, South Yorkshire, England

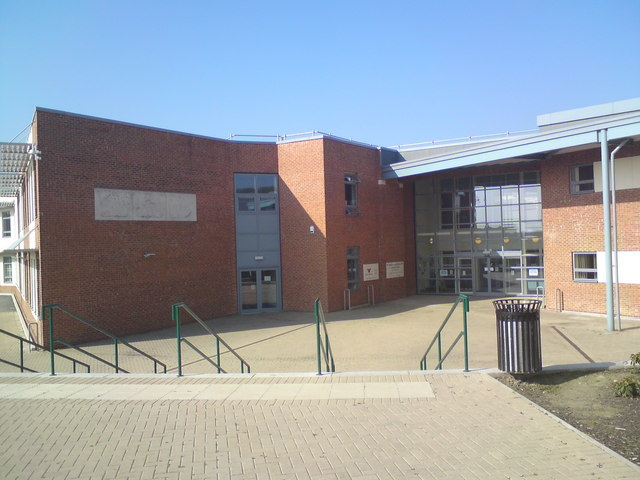
- Entrance to the new school building (2009)

Location
- Dyche Lane; Sheffield, South Yorkshire, S8 8BR; England; 53°19′33″N 1°28′10″W

Information
- Type: Academy
- Motto: Learning and Achieving Together
- Established: 1987
- Local authority: City of Sheffield
- Specialist: Language College
- Department for Education URN: 138545 Tables
- Ofsted: Reports
- Headteacher: Kam Grewal-Joy
- Staff: 183
- Gender: Coeducational
- Age: 11 to 18
- Enrolment: 2000
- Website: http://www.meadowhead.sheffield.sch.uk

Meadowhead School is a mixed secondary school and Language College with academy status in Sheffield, South Yorkshire, England. There are currently around 2000 students on roll, about 120 teaching staff and approximately 50 non-teaching staff.

== History ==
Meadowhead School was created when the two schools of Jordanthorpe Comprehensive School and Rowlinson School merged in 1987. The school remained on two sites approximately 0.25 miles apart until January 2007 when the new building was opened on land in between the two sites of Jordanthorpe. The Rowlinson School site became part of Norton College. The previous school sites of Jordanthorpe were demolished. The site where the North Building once stood became a Gilders Volkswagen and Audi car showroom and the area where the South Building was became the new school's playing fields. The new building was built just to the south of where the original North Building stood.

== School Specialism ==
It has been a Specialist Language College since 2001 and was re-designated as such in 2005. The school converted to academy status in 2012.

== Academic ==
As of January 2023, the most recent data shows that the GCSE (Grade 5 or Above) pass rate, including English and Maths, was 57%, which was well above the average for Sheffield (47%) and for the UK (50%). 31% of students at Meadowhead School entered the English Baccalaureate, compared with 37% in Sheffield and 39% nationally.

In its most recent Ofsted inspection, the school was rated as ‘Good’.

== Post-16 ==
Meadowhead gained Trust status in September 2009, and now offers post-16 courses. In October 2017 the school opened its new 6th form building.

== School Logo ==
The School's logo is a phoenix, representing Meadowhead School rising from the ashes of Jordanthorpe Comprehensive School and Rowlinson School. There is a large statue of a phoenix in the central area of the school, named The Rosling.

== Alumni ==
=== Meadowhead School ===
- Elizabeth Henstridge, actress and model
- Jordan Robertson, former footballer who played for Sheffield United and Southampton
- Joe Rowley, footballer for AFC Fylde
- Jonathan Forte, former footballer for Sheffield United and Scunthorpe
- Harvey Gilmour, footballer for FC Halifax Town
- Kyron Gordon, footballer for Sheffield United

=== Jordanthorpe School ===
- Helen Sharman OBE, chemist and astronaut
- Fraser Digby, footballer formerly of Manchester United and Swindon Town
- Joanne Catherall, singer and member of the band The Human League
- Susan Sulley, singer and also a member of the band The Human League
- Jamie Hoyland, footballer formerly of Sheffield United

=== Rowlinson School ===
- Colin Crorkin MBE, Ambassador to the Gambia since 2014
- Candida Doyle, keyboard player in Pulp
- Pete McKee, artist and ukulele player in The Everly Pregnant Brothers
- Meg Munn, Member of Parliament

=== Rowlinson Technical School ===
- Chris Watson (musician) of Cabaret Voltaire
- Chris Stainton, musician who has worked with Joe Cocker, The Who and Eric Clapton.
