= St John's Road =

St John's Road or St. John's Road can refer to:

- St John's Road, East, a street in Dublin, Ireland.
- St John's Road, West, a section of the N4 road in Dublin, Ireland.
- St John's Road, Oxford, former name of St Bernard's Road.
- St John's Road, London, a street in Clapham Junction (area), London.
- St John's Road, Singapore, a street in Sembawang, Singapore.
