= List of consuls-general of the United Kingdom in Boston =

The British Consulate-General, Boston is the United Kingdom's local consulate for New England, including Connecticut, Maine, Massachusetts, New Hampshire, Rhode Island and Vermont.

== List of consuls-general ==
- 1899–1902: Sir John Blunt CB
- 1908: William Wyndham
- 1908–1919: Frederick Leay
- 1919–1920: Sir Harry Armstrong KCMG KBE
- 1920–1922: Thomas Porter
- 1922–1931: Edward Gray
- 1931–1933: George Beak
- 1933–1943: Hugh Ford
- 1943–1944: Sir Anthony George KCMG (died in office)
- 1944–1947: Bernard Sullivan MBE
- 1947–1950: Eric Whitamore
- 1950–1954: Leslie Barber MBE
- 1954–1955: Sir William Barker KCMG OBE
- 1955–1958: Sir Robert Marett KCMG OBE
- 1959–1962: George Edmondson CMG CVO OBE
- 1962–1966: Sir John Curle KCVO CMG
- 1966–1969: Ralph Selby CMG
- 1969–1971: Leonore Storar
- 1971–1975: Alastair Maitland CBE
- 1975–1977: Granville Ramage CMG
- 1977–1980: Sir Giles Bullard KCVO CMG
- 1980–1983: Philip McKearney CMG
- 1983–1987: David A. Burns CMG CBE
- 1988–1991: Philip McLean CMG
- 1992–1995: John Wynne Owen CMG MBE
- 1995–1999: James Poston CBE
- 1999–2003: George Fergusson
- 2003–2007: John Rankin
- 2007–2012: Phil Budden
- 2012–2016: Susie Kitchens
- 2016–2020: Harriet Cross
- 2020–2024: Peter Abbott OBE
- 2024–present: David Clay MBE

== See also ==
- List of diplomatic missions in Boston
