= Harry Armstrong (diplomat) =

Sir Harry Armstrong KCMG KBE

Consul-General in New York
- In office 1920–1931
- Preceded by: Wilfred Gilbert Thesiger (appointed but did not proceed)
- Succeeded by: Sir Gerald Campbell

Consul-General in Boston
- In office 1919–1920
- Preceded by: Frederick Leay
- Succeeded by: Thomas Porter

Personal details
- Born: Henry Gloster Armstrong; 17 January 1861 Belturbet, County Cavan, Ireland
- Died: 6 February 1938 (aged 77) Port Washington, New York
- Spouse: Margaret Hanway (m. 1912; died 1938)
- Children: 3
- Parent(s): John Armstrong; Sarah Helen Moffatt
- Education: Royal School Cavan

Sir Henry Gloster Armstrong KCMG KBE (17 January 1861 – 6 February 1938), was an Irish-born diplomat for the United Kingdom, spy and businessman.

== Early life ==
Henry Gloster Armstrong was born on 17 January 1861 in Belturbet, County Cavan, Ireland. He was the son of John Armstrong, a wealthy solicitor in Cavan Town, and the former Sarah Helen Moffatt. His siblings included elder brothers James and John George, and sister Sophia Jane Armstrong. His younger siblings were Constance Maria, and Kathleen Helen Armstrong.

His maternal grandparents were Joanne (née Richardson) Moffatt and the Rev. George Beatty Moffatt, of the Vicarage, Belturbet.

After attending the Royal School Cavan, he was educated at Dr. Benson's School in Dublin before studying at the Army Academy (also known as the Queen's Service Academy) under Dr. Chetwode Crawley.

== Career ==
In 1878, Armstrong enlisted with the Royal Irish Fusiliers as Second Lieutenant, before resigning in 1884 with the rank of Captain, remaining on the officers' reserve. being an actor with Maurice Barrymore at the Haymarket Theatre.

In 1891, he came to the United States, ostensibly as a business man on behalf of the Mexican Land Company of London. In reality, he was selected by Major Nicholas Gosselin, who had taken charge of Special Irish Branch at the Home Office, as a spy operative tasked with infiltrating Irish-American secret societies including Fenian organisations. In this capacity, Armstrong served as the manager and secretary of the Mexican Land and Colonization Company and visited South America several times. After the outbreak of World War I in Europe, he served as agent of the Manchester Ship Canal Company. While in America, he retained his British citizenship, thus enabling him to be appointed to the consulate, first in Boston. While there, he lived at 269 Beacon Street in the Back Bay. After his brief term in Boston, he returned to New York, where he served as Consul-General for eleven years. In 1925, he was the principal founder of the Society of Foreign Consuls in New York, serving as its president until October 1930. He was succeeded as Consul-General in New York by Sir Gerald Campbell, the British Consul-General at San Francisco since 1922.

=== Later life ===
After his retirement, Sir Harry and Lady Armstrong returned to England aboard the RMS Majestic. He was appointed a director of on the London Board of the Australian Bank of Commerce and was appointed commercial adviser to the Manchester Ship Canal Company. He returned to the United States several times to visit friends.

== Personal life ==
Armstrong was twice married. With his first wife, he was the father of one son and two daughters:

- Thaddeus Gloster Armstrong (1887–1963), who married artist Claire Kathleen Hanway, the younger sister of his stepmother, in 1921.
- Genevieve Armstrong, who married Watson.
- Constance Armstrong, who died unmarried.

On 21 November 1912 Armstrong married Margaret Hanway (1877–1953), who became known for her involvement in Catholic charities of New York. She was a daughter of Irish-born editor and writer Patrick J. Hanway and her mother who grew up in a Brooklyn home where Walt Whitman was a frequent guest. She was decorated by His Holiness Pope Pius XII with the Pro Ecclesia et Pontifice medal in 1942.

Armstrong was a member of Raleigh Club in London and the Calumet Club in New York. He was elected to the Century Association on 3 March 1917 after being proposed for admission by Eustace Conway and Charles C. Barrows.

Sir Harry died of pneumonia on 6 February 1938 at his son's home in Port Washington, New York, and was buried at Holy Cross Cemetery, Brooklyn. His widow died at their home in Port Washington in 1953.

=== Honours ===
In the 1923 Birthday Honours, Armstrong was appointed a Knight Commander of the Order of the British Empire (KBE). He was also appointed a Knight Commandership of the Order of St Michael and St George in 1931.

Diplomatic posts
| Preceded by Frederick Leay | Consul-General in Boston; 1919–1920 | Succeeded by Thomas Porter |
| Preceded by Wilfred Gilbert Thesiger (appointed but did not proceed) | Consul-General in New York; 1920–1931 | Succeeded by Sir Gerald Campbell |
