= Stigmella filipendulae =

Scientific classification
- Kingdom: Animalia
- Phylum: Arthropoda
- Clade: Pancrustacea
- Class: Insecta
- Order: Lepidoptera
- Family: Nepticulidae
- Genus: Stigmella
- Species: S. filipendulae

Binomial name
- Stigmella filipendulae (Wocke, 1871)

Synonyms
- Nepticula filipendulae Wocke, 1871; Nepticula ulmariae Wocke, 1879; Stigmella ulmariae

Species of moth

Stigmella filipendulae is a moth of the family Nepticulidae. It is found from Fennoscandia to the Alps and the Carpathians, and from Ireland to Poland. There is a disjunct population in Greece.

The wingspan is 3–5 millimetres (0.12–0.20 in). The head is ferruginous to dark fuscous. The antennal eyecaps are yellow-whitish. The forewings are shining golden-brown, sometimes purplish-tinged with a pale golden-metallic vertical fascia beyond middleThe apical area beyond this is dark purple-fuscous. The hindwings grey.

Adults are on wing from July to August and again in September. There are two generations per year.

== Distribution and threat level ==
In England, it is found between Leckford and St. Catherine's Hill of Hampshire and is also abundant in North Somerset and southern part of Wiltshire. It is considered endangered in East Sussex and Eastbourne while in West Sussex is considered to be extinct, since there was no recordings of it there since 1905.

== Ecology ==
The larvae feed on Filipendula vulgaris and Filipendula ulmaria.
