= Robert Marett =

Robert Marett may refer to:

- Robert Pipon Marett (1820–1884), British lawyer, journalist, poet, and politician
- Robert Ranulph Marett (1866–1943), British ethnologist
- Robert Marett (diplomat) (1907–1981), British author and diplomat
