= Martin Le Quesne =

British diplomat (1917–2004)

Sir Martin Le Quesne KCMG (10 June 1917 – 3 April 2004) was a British diplomat, ambassador to Mali and Algeria and high commissioner to Nigeria.

== Biography ==
Charles Martin Le Quesne, son of Charles Thomas Le Quesne, was educated at Shrewsbury School and Exeter College, Oxford. He served in the Royal Artillery 1940–45 and joined the Foreign Service in 1946. He served at Baghdad, Bahrain and Rome, and in the Foreign Office (later the Foreign and Commonwealth Office, FCO), before being appointed chargé d'affaires in Mali when that country gained independence from France in 1960; subsequently he was Ambassador there 1961–64. After another post in the Foreign Office 1964–68, he was Ambassador to Algeria 1968–71. He was deputy Under-Secretary at the FCO 1971–74, with responsibility for Africa and the Middle East.

He became the senior official adviser on Rhodesia – a problem then poisoning Britain's relations with the black African states. He devoted his formidable intellectual energy to finding an honourable solution, but to no avail. The fruit was not yet ripe and it was only in 1979, after Le Quesne's retirement, that Lord Carrington brought off with great skill and courage the hitherto elusive settlement.
— The Telegraph, 10 April 2004

Le Quesne was High Commissioner to Nigeria 1974–76. His time in Nigeria was brought to an unlucky end by an attempted military coup by Lt. Col. Buka Suka Dimka, who ambushed and assassinated the president, Murtala Mohammed on 13 February 1976. Dimka then visited Le Quesne and asked him to relay a message to General Gowon in London. Le Quesne refused, but the visit had compromised his position and he was expelled by Mohammed's successor, Olusegun Obasanjo.

Le Quesne was then within a year of his statutory retirement age, so he retired to Jersey and was a member of the States of Jersey 1978–90.

Le Quesne was appointed CMG in the New Year Honours of 1963 and knighted KCMG in the Queen's Birthday Honours of 1974.

Diplomatic posts
Preceded by Adam Watson	Ambassador Extraordinary and Plenipotentiary at Bamako; 1961–1964	Succeeded by John Waterfield
Preceded by No representation	Ambassador Extraordinary and Plenipotentiary at Algiers; 1968–1971	Succeeded by Ronald Burroughs
Preceded by Sir Cyril Pickard	High Commissioner to Nigeria; 1974–1976	Succeeded by Sir Sam Falle
