= Ronald Burroughs =

British diplomat

His Excellency Ronald Burroughs CMG

Her Majesty's Ambassador to Algeria
- In office 1971–1973
- Preceded by: Sir Martin Le Quesne KCMG
- Succeeded by: John Robinson

Personal details
- Born: 4 June 1917 Tibet
- Died: 24 May 1980 (aged 62)
- Spouse(s): 1st Jean Valerie McQuillen; 2nd Audrey Cunha
- Children: Two daughters by his first wife
- Education: St John's School, Leatherhead
- Alma mater: Trinity College, Cambridge
- Occupation: Diplomat

Ronald Arthur Burroughs CMG (4 June 1917 – 24 May 1980) was a British diplomat who served as Her Majesty's Ambassador to Algeria between 1971 and 1973. A letter he wrote to Sir James Craig in 1971 concerning The Spanish Ambassador’s Suitcase became the title of a book by Matthew Parris and Andrew Bryson on amusing unofficial letters of diplomacy. In the book Parris states that in ‘diplomatic circles The Spanish Ambassador’s Suitcase despatch is by impute probably the greatest funny of them all’.

== Life ==
Ronald Arthur Burroughs was born on 4 June 1917 in Tibet, the son of the Rev. Henry Frederick Burroughs, a missionary, and his wife Ada. He was educated at St John's School, Leatherhead, and Trinity College, Cambridge.

During World War II, Burroughs served in the Fleet Air Arm and afterwards joined the Foreign Office. On his first overseas appointment he was Second Secretary at the British Embassy in Rio de Janeiro between 1947 and 1949. After Brazil, he worked at the British Consul in Marseille between 1949 and 1950.

Burroughs was appointed First Secretary at the British Embassy in Cairo, a position he held between 1950 and 1953 before returning to London where he worked at the Foreign Office until 1955. He spent one year at The Canadian National Defence College before his appointment as First Secretary in Vienna, between 1956 and 1959, and was subsequently a Counsellor at the Foreign Office between 1959 and 1962.

Burroughs returned to Rio de Janeiro in 1962 as Counsellor and Head of Chancery at the British Embassy before his transfer to the British Embassy in Lisbon in 1964. He was made CMG in 1966. After Portugal he was made British Charge D'Affaires in South Yemen between 1967 and 1968. In 1969 he returned to England as an Assistant Under-Secretary of State at the Foreign and Commonwealth Office before being seconded to the Home Office as the UK’s Representative to the Northern Ireland Government where he handled security in the province.

Burroughs was made British Ambassador to Algeria, a position he held from 1971 until his retirement in 1973. A letter he wrote to Sir James Craig in 1971 concerning The Spanish Ambassador’s Suitcase became the title of a book by Matthew Parris and Andrew Bryson on amusing unofficial letters of diplomacy. In the book Parris states that in ‘diplomatic circles The Spanish Ambassador’s Suitcase despatch is by impute probably the greatest funny of them all’.

Ronald Burroughs died on 24 May 1980 at the age of 62. In 1947 he married Jean Valerie McQuillen with whom he had two daughters. In 1971 he married secondly Audrey Cunha. There were no children by the second marriage.
