= Margery Perham =

British historian (1895–1982)

Dame Margery Perham DCMG CBE FBA
- Born: Margery Freda Perham; 6 September 1895; Bury, Lancashire, England
- Died: 19 February 1982 (aged 86)
- Education: School of S. Anne, Abbots Bromley; St Hugh's College, Oxford
- Occupation: Historian

Dame Margery Freda Perham DCMG CBE FBA (6 September 1895 – 19 February 1982) was a British historian of, and writer on, African affairs. She was known especially for the intellectual force of her arguments in favour of British decolonisation in the 1950s and 1960s.

== Life and career ==
She was born in Bury, Lancashire, and was educated at the School of S. Anne, Abbots Bromley and St Hugh's College, Oxford. After completing her Oxford degree, she became an assistant lecturer in history at the University of Sheffield in 1917. In 1922, as a result of illness, she took a year’s leave, which she spent in Somaliland with her sister’s family, beginning her lifelong interest in the British African colonies.

In 1924, she became a tutor and subsequently fellow in modern history and modern greats (philosophy, politics and economics) at St Hugh's College. In 1929, she was awarded a travelling fellowship administered by The Rhodes Trust, which oversees the Rhodes Scholarship (closed to women until 1977), and from July 1929 until early 1932 visited the United States, the Pacific islands, Australia, New Zealand, and much of Africa south of the Sahara. In 1932 she was awarded a Rockefeller Travelling Fellowship for travel and study in East Africa and the Sudan.

During the 1930s, she wrote the first of many books on Africa, including Native Administration in Nigeria (1937) and African Discovery (1942; jointly with Jack Simmons), and from 1935 to 1939 was research lecturer in colonial administration at Oxford. In 1939, she was appointed the first official and only woman fellow of the newly founded Nuffield College, Oxford, and was also elected reader in colonial administration, a post she held until 1948. Her teaching at this time was almost entirely devoted to the first and second Devonshire courses for colonial servants, though later she played a part in the development of universities for the new African leaders and experts, and helped in the initiation of the Oxford Colonial Records Project. Her books, reports and papers provided the basis for the Oxford Institute of Colonial Studies, to which she was appointed director, 1945–1948.

Her 1941 book Africans and British Rule was banned in Kenya by the British Governor who argued that the book had "anti-settler bias" that would likely "stir up racial feelings". At the same time, the book was criticized by anti-colonial activists such as C. L. R. James and George Padmore.

Her official biography of Lord Lugard appeared in two volumes in 1956 and 1960, and she published four volumes of Lugard’s diaries (1959–63).

In 1961, she became the first woman to deliver the Reith Lectures, her lectures being published as The Colonial Reckoning. Historian Kenneth O. Morgan called these lectures "a powerful intellectual force" and "widely influential", especially in shaping the Labour Party's views on decolonisation. Historian Caroline Elkins describes Perham as having "encyclopedic knowledge of the empire and its administration."

She was appointed CBE in 1948 and DCMG in 1965. She received honorary degrees from several universities, and was made an Honorary Fellow of St Hugh's College, Oxford, in 1962. She was the first President of the African Studies Association of the UK (ASAUK; 1963–64).

In 1968, she was criticised strongly when she espoused the cause of Biafra in the Nigerian Civil War. After a visit to Nigeria, she recanted her earlier views publicly on radio and television. She was elected a foreign honorary member of the American Academy of Arts and Sciences in 1969.

== See also ==
- Institute of Commonwealth Studies
