= Richard Faber =

Sir Richard Stanley Faber CMG KCVO FRSL (6 December 1924 – 18 October 2007) was a British diplomat and writer.

== Early life ==
He was born in Kensington and was the eldest son of Sir Geoffrey Faber, the founder of the publisher Faber and Faber. He was educated at Dragon School before he won a scholarship for Westminster School, where he became head of the school. He then served in the Royal Navy between 1943 and 1946, and took part in the unopposed landing of Malaysia, Operation Zipper. He went up to Christ Church, Oxford, where he was also President of the Oxford Union. He was awarded a First in Greats in 1949.

== Diplomatic career ==
Faber served in the Diplomatic Service from 1950 until 1981. Between 1967 and 1969 was head of the Rhodesia Political Department at the Foreign Office and then served as a counsellor to The Hague between 1969 and 1973. He was counsellor in Cairo from 1973 until 1975 before being appointed Assistant Under-Secretary of State, Foreign and Commonwealth Office, an office he held between 1975 and 1977. His final diplomatic office was ambassador to Algeria from 1977 until 1981.

== Works ==
- Beaconsfield and Bolingbroke (London: Faber and Faber, 1961).
- The Vision and the Need: Late Victorian Imperial Aims (London: Faber and Faber, 1966).
- Proper Station: Class in Victorian Fiction (London: Faber and Faber, 1971).
- French and English (London: Faber and Faber, 1975).
- The Brave Courtier, Sir William Temple (London: Faber and Faber, 1983).
- High Road to England (London: Faber and Faber, 1985).
- Young England (London: Faber and Faber, 1987).
- A Brother's Murder: Lees Court, Sheldwich 1655 (Faversham Society, 1992)
- A Chain of Cities (Bloomsbury Academic, 2000).

== Notes ==
Diplomatic posts
Preceded by John Armstrong Robinson	British Ambassador to Algeria; 1977–1981	Succeeded by Benjamin Strachan
