= Consulate General of Canada, Boston =

Diplomatic mission of Canada in Massachusetts, United States

Consulate General of Canada in Boston
- Location: Boston, Massachusetts, United States
- Address: Three Copley Place, Suite 400
- Consul General: Bernadette Jordan

The Consulate General of Canada in Boston (French: Consulat général du Canada à Boston) is a diplomatic mission of Canada located in Suite 400 of Three Copley Place in Boston, Massachusetts, United States. The geographical jurisdiction of the Boston office covers the New England states of Maine, Massachusetts, New Hampshire, Rhode Island, and Vermont. It further supports the Canadian Embassy in Washington, D.C., and is one of twelve consulates general and three consulates/trade commissioner offices located in the United States.

The Consulate General in Boston opened in 1948. The mission focuses on relations dealing in: technology, research and development, product commercialization, joint-ventures trade relationships, strategic partnerships, and both greenfield and financial investments between New England and Canada.

The Canadian province of Québec has maintained a separate secondary government office in Boston as part of the provincial Ministry of International Relations since the early 1970s.

== Past consuls-general ==
- James A. Strong (1951/02/01 – 1969/07/19)
- George S. Patterson (1951/07/31 – 1953/?/?)
- Jean-Louis Délisle (1953/11/? – 1954/07/?)
- Jean-Louis Fournier (1954/09/22 – 1957/09/03)
- Alexandre Boudreau (1957/03/14 – 1958?)
- Stuart D. Helmsley (1958/09/25 – ?)
- Joseph François-Xavier Houde (1970/06/04 – 1973/09/18)
- Marion A. Macpherson (1976/09/21 – 1977/08/31)
- Timothy A. Williams (1978/01/19 – ?)
- Jean-Marie Gaétan Déry (1980/?/? – 1983/?/?)
- Hon. Barnett J. Danson (1983/?/? – 1986/?/?)
- Pierrette A. Lucas (1987/?/? – 1989/?/? )
- Hon. Thomas McMillan (1989/08/24 – 1993/?/?)
- Hon. Donald W. Cameron (1993/06/23 – 1997/?/?)
- Hon. Mary Clancy (1997/07/10 – 2001/?/?)
- Hon. Ron Irwin (2001/08/20 – 2005/?/?)
- Stan Keyes (2005/08/02 – 2006/?/?)
- Neil LeBlanc (2006/07/13 – 2010/08/09)
- Patrick G. Binns (2010/08/10 – 2015/04/22)
- David N. Alward (2015/02/23 – 2020/11/30)
- Hon. Rodger Cuzner (2020/11/30 – 2023/06/30)
- Bernadette Jordan (2023/12/04 – present)

== See also ==
- Boston–Halifax relations
- Northern New England Corridor, a concept of high speed rail between Canada and New England.
- Canada-United States relations
- Embassy of the United States in Ottawa
- List of ambassadors of Canada to the United States
- List of diplomatic missions in Boston
