= List of diplomatic missions in Boston =

This is a list of diplomatic missions in Boston, Massachusetts, United States (and surrounding environs of "Greater" or "Metro-Boston"). These countries have established a resident consular presence to provide diplomatic and trade representation.

== Consulates ==
=== Boston ===
Country	Headed by	Address	Neighborhood	Photo
Brazil	Glivania de Oliveira, Consul-General	175 Purchase Street, 02110	Financial District	
Canada	Bernadette Jordan, Consul-General	3 Copley Place, Suite 400	Back Bay	
Colombia	Daisy Carolina Mejía Gil, Consul-General	31 St. James Avenue, Suite 960	Back Bay	
Dominican Republic	Dominico Cabral Abad, Consul-General	20 Park Plaza, Suite 601	Back Bay	
El Salvador	Abelino Chicas Hernández, Consul-General	46 Bennington Street	East Boston	
France	Mustafa Soykurt, Consul-General	31 St. James Avenue, Suite 750	Back Bay	
Germany	Dr. Sonja Kreibich, Consul-General	3 Copley Place, Suite 500	Back Bay	
Greece	Symeon Tegos, Consul-General	86 Beacon Street	Back Bay/Beacon Hill	
Haiti	Emmanuelle Dupiton, Acting Consul-General	545 Boylston Street, Suite 201	Back Bay	
Ireland	Laoise Moore, Consul-General	535 Boylston Street, 5th Floor	Back Bay	
Israel	Meron Reuben, Consul-General	20 Park Plaza, Suite 1020	Back Bay	
Italy	Arnaldo Minuti, Consul-General	600 Atlantic Avenue, 17th Floor	Financial District	
Japan	Seiichiro Takahashi, Consul-General	100 High Street, 6th Floor	Financial District	
Mexico	Alberto Fierro Garza, Consul-General	55 Franklin St, 1st Floor	Financial District	
Peru	Carla Stella Maris Chirinos Llerena, Consul-General	20 Park Plaza, Suite 511	Back Bay	
Portugal	Tiago Araújo, Consul-General	31 St. James Avenue, Suite 350	Back Bay	
Spain	Ana Durán de la Colina	31 St. James Avenue, Suite 905	Back Bay	
Turkey	Murat Lütem, Consul-General	31 St. James Avenue, Suite 840	Back Bay	
United Arab Emirates	Salem Alshami, Consul-General	One International Place, Suite 2901	Financial District	

=== Cambridge ===
The city of Cambridge is located very close to downtown Boston, directly across the Charles River.

Country	Headed by	Address	Neighborhood	Photo
Denmark	Joan Hentze, Head of Mission	245 Main street	Kendall Square	
Switzerland	Philippe Roesle, Consul and CEO of Swissnex	420 Broadway, Cambridge MA 02138, https://swissnex.org/boston/	Between Harvard and MIT	
United Kingdom	David Clay MBE, Consul-General	One Broadway	Kendall Square	

=== Chelsea ===
The city of Chelsea, Massachusetts is located across the Mystic River from Boston's Charlestown neighborhood.

Country	Headed by	Address
Honduras	Consul	90 Everett Ave, 3rd Floor

=== Newton ===
The city of Newton is a suburban community which borders the western side of the Boston neighborhoods of Allston-Brighton.

Country	Headed by	Address
South Korea	You Ki-Jun, Consul-General	One Gateway Center, 2nd Floor

=== Quincy ===
The city of Quincy borders the southern edge of the Boston neighborhood of Dorchester.

Country	Headed by	Address
Cape Verde	Adeus Juiz George Leitao, Consul-General	300 Congress Street, Suite 204

== Honorary consulates ==
All honorary consulates are in Boston proper unless otherwise indicated.

- Albania
- Austria (in Medfield)
- Bulgaria (in Newton)
- Cambodia (in Lowell)
- Chile
- Cyprus (in Cambridge)
- Czechia (in Wellesley)
- Denmark
- Ecuador (in Needham)
- Estonia
- Finland
- Georgia (in Cambridge)
- Hungary
- Iceland (in Dedham)
- Jamaica
- Latvia (in Needham)
- Lebanon (in Andover)
- Luxembourg
- Malta (in Belmont)
- Monaco
- Morocco
- Nepal
- Netherlands
- Nicaragua (in Springfield)
- Norway
- Pakistan (in Millis)
- Poland (in Cohasset)
- Romania (in Concord)
- Senegal (in Dedham)
- Slovakia (in Weston)
- Sweden
- Thailand

Source: Massachusetts Executive Office of Housing and Economic Development

== Missions and representative offices in Boston ==
- Québec, Ministry of International Relations (Quebec) – Québec Government Offices
- Taiwan, Economic and Cultural Office

== See also ==
- List of diplomatic missions in the United States
