= John Blunt (diplomat) =

British diplomat (1832–1916)

Sir John Blunt CB

British Consul-General in Boston
- In office 1899–1902
- Preceded by: Post established
- Succeeded by: William Wyndham

Personal details
- Born: 14 October 1832
- Died: 19 June 1916 (aged 83) Malta
- Occupation: Diplomat

Sir John Elijah Blunt (14 October 1832 – 19 June 1916) was a British diplomat who served as consul-general in Boston from 1899 to 1902.

== Early life and education ==
Blunt was born on 14 October 1832, the son of Charles Blunt, who was British consul at Smyrna, and Caroline Vitalis. He was educated privately and at Kensington Grammar School.

== Career ==
Blunt joined the consular service in 1850, and served in various consular posts in Turkey. When the Crimean War broke out he was acting vice-consul at Rhodes and in recognition of his linguistic skills was appointed chief interpreter to the British Cavalry Division commanded by General Lord Lucan. He also acted as his secretary, and was present at the battles of the Alma, Balaclava, and Inkerman.

After the Crimean War, Blunt was sent to the Balkans where he would spend over 40 years in various consular posts. Under Turkish rule at the time, he became a trusted adviser of several Turkish governors. In 1862 and 1868, he received the thanks of the President of the United States for services rendered to American citizens suffering under misrule in the province of Adrianople, and was nominated by the US for the post of consul for Rumelia, but was not allowed to accept the appointment.

In 1877, during the Russo-Turkish War, Blunt was consul for Salonika, Prisrend and Thessaly and, in recognition of services rendered during the war, he was made a CB. In 1878, he was promoted to consul-general for the Vilayets of Salonira, Monastir, Jamnau, and Cossova, and for the Mustekil of Serwidehe. In 1879, he was promoted to consul-general at Salonika, a post he held until 1899. He also acted temporarily as French vice-consul on two occasions at Volos and twice at Monastir; as German consul; and twice as Belgian consul at Salonika. In 1897, he provided valuable assistance to the Turks during the Greco-Turkish War for which he received the gold medal of the Imtiaz from the Sultan.

Blunt was then transferred to the Consulate at Boston in the United States in 1899, where he served as consul-general for the States of Massachusetts, Vermont, New Hampshire and Maine from 1899 to 1902.

== Personal life and death ==
Blunt married in 1858 Fanny Janet Sandison, daughter of the British consul at Bursa.

Blunt died on 19 June 1916 at Malta, aged 83, where he had resided since his retirement from the consular service.

== Honours ==
Blunt was created Knight Bachelor in the 1902 Birthday Honours. He was appointed Companion of the Order of the Bath (CB) in 1878.

== See also ==
- British Consulate-General, Boston

Diplomatic posts
| New office | British Consul-General in Boston; 1899–1902 | Succeeded by William Wyndham |
