= Reader Bullard =

British diplomat and author (1885–1976)

Sir Reader Bullard KCB KCMG CIE
- Portrait by Walter Stoneman, 1950

British Ambassador to Iran
- In office 1942–1946
- Preceded by: Sir Horace Seymour
- Succeeded by: Sir John Le Rougetel

Personal details
- Born: Reader William Bullard; 5 December 1885 Walthamstow, Essex, England
- Died: 24 May 1976 (aged 90) Wantage, Oxfordshire, England
- Spouse: Miriam Catherine Smith (m. 1921; died 1973)
- Children: 5, including Giles and Julian
- Education: Queens' College, Cambridge
- Occupation: Diplomat; author

Sir Reader William Bullard KCB KCMG CIE (5 December 1885 – 24 May 1976) was a British diplomat and author.

== Education ==
Reader Bullard was born in Walthamstow, the son of Charles, a dock labourer, and Mary Bullard. He was educated at the Monoux School there and later at Bancroft's School, Woodford Green, northeast London, and spent two years studying at Queens' College, Cambridge. He entered the Levant (Western Asia) Consular Service of the Foreign Office in 1906.

== Career ==
Bullard held various diplomatic positions during his career:

- 1920: Military Governor, Baghdad, Iraq
- 1921: Middle East Department, Colonial Office
- 1923–25: Consul, Jeddah, Saudi Arabia
- 1925–28: Consul, Athens, Greece
- 1928: Consul, Addis Ababa, Ethiopia
- 1930: Consul General, Moscow, Russia
- 1931–34: Leningrad, Russia
- 1934: Rabat, Morocco
- 1936–39: Minister, Jedda, Saudi Arabia
- 1939–46: Minister and later Ambassador, Tehran, Iran

In Eastern Approaches, Fitzroy Maclean describes how Bullard and General Joseph Baillon, the Chief of Staff, requested him to kidnap a powerful Iranian. They were concerned about the influence of Fazlollah Zahedi, the general in charge of the Iranian forces in the Isfahan area, who, their intelligence told them, was stockpiling grain, liaising with German agents, and preparing an uprising. Baillon and Bullard asked Maclean to remove Zahidi alive and without creating a fuss, and so he did so. (Zahedi spent the rest of the war in British Palestine; five years later he was back in charge of the military of southern Iran, by 1953 he was prime minister.)

In 1951, Bullard became Director of the Institute of Colonial Studies in Oxford. In 1953, he became a member of the governing body of School of Oriental and African Studies (SOAS), University of London.

Bullard was appointed Companion of the Order of the Indian Empire (CIE) in 1916, Companion of the Order of St Michael and St George (CMG) in 1933, Knight Commander of the Order of St Michael and St George (KCMG) in 1936, and Knight Commander of the Order of the Bath (KCB) in 1944. He was an Honorary Fellow of Queens' College, Cambridge, SOAS in London, and Lincoln College, Oxford.

== Personal life ==
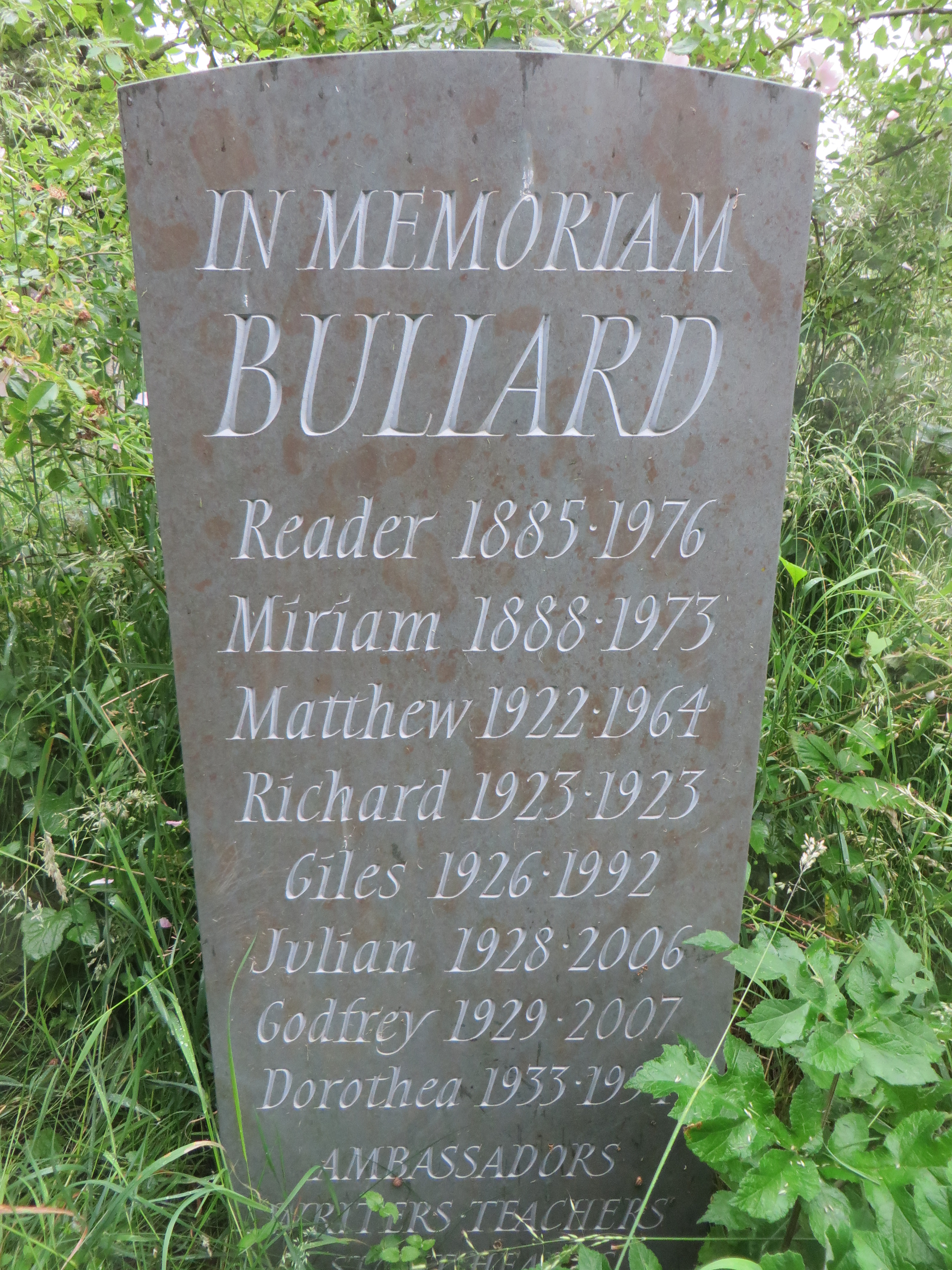
"In Memoriam Bullard" memorial stone in Holywell Cemetery, Oxford

In 1921, Reader Bullard married Miriam Catherine (Biddy), née Smith (1888–1973), daughter of the historian Arthur Lionel Smith, Master of Balliol College, Oxford. They had four sons and one daughter, including the diplomats Sir Giles Bullard (1926–1992) and Sir Julian Bullard (1928–2006).

Bullard retired in 1946. Towards the end of his life he lived in Plantation Road, North Oxford. Bullard's papers have been archived by St Antony's College, Oxford.

He was on the governing body of Abingdon School from 1951 to 1955.

== Works ==
Bullard published a number of books, including Britain and the Middle East (Hutchinson, 1951) and his autobiography The Camels Must Go: An Autobiography (Faber, 1961). The diaries that he kept during his time in the Soviet Union were published posthumously, under the title Inside Stalin's Russia (Day Books, 2000).

See also Margaret Bullard - Bootstraps: A Memoir of Reader William Bullard (MPG Books Group, 2008)

== See also ==
- List of diplomats from the United Kingdom to Iran
