= Plantation Road =

Road in North Oxford, England

Coordinates: 51.7629°N 1.2654°W

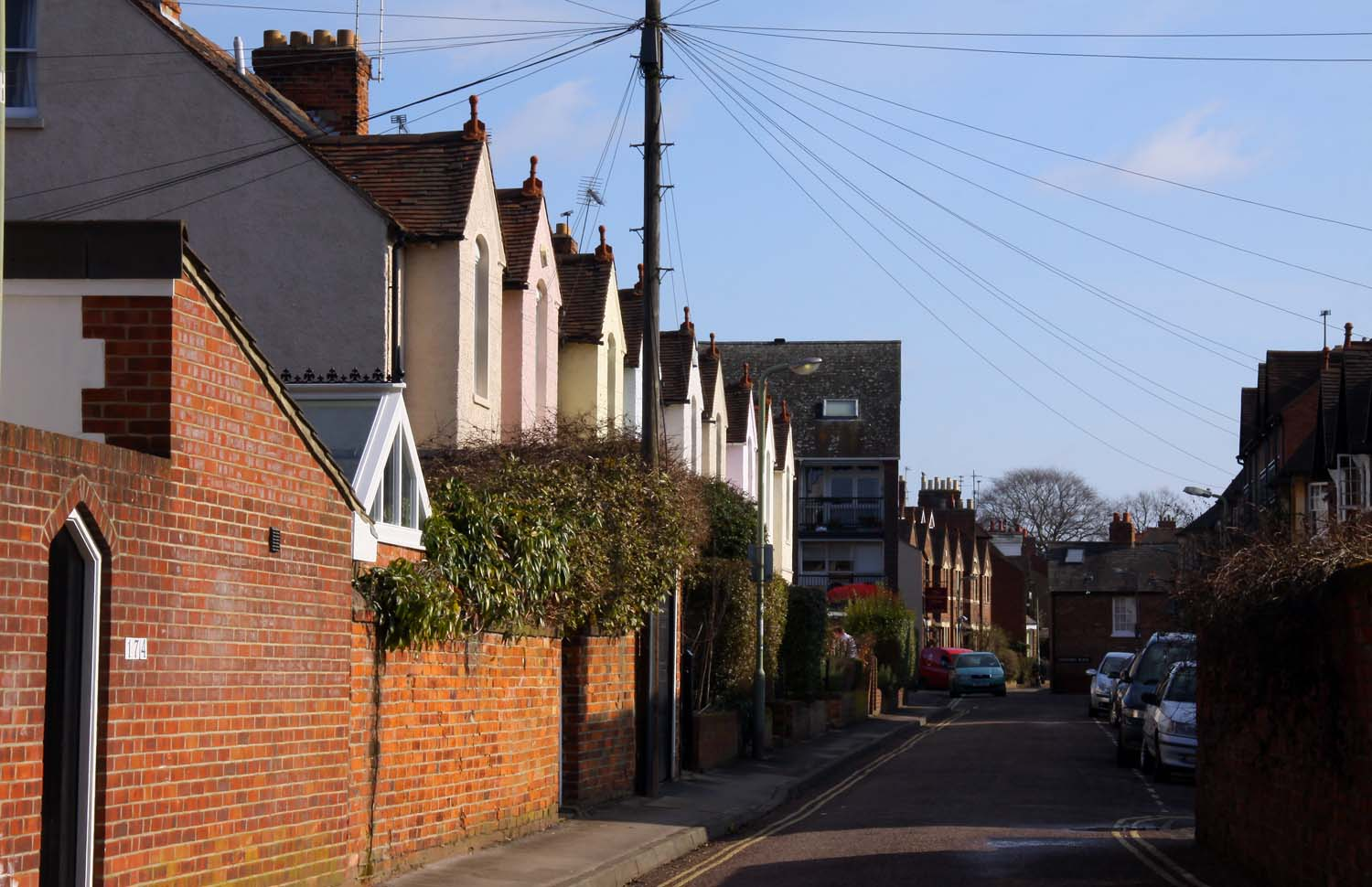
Plantation Road from the western end at Kingston Road.

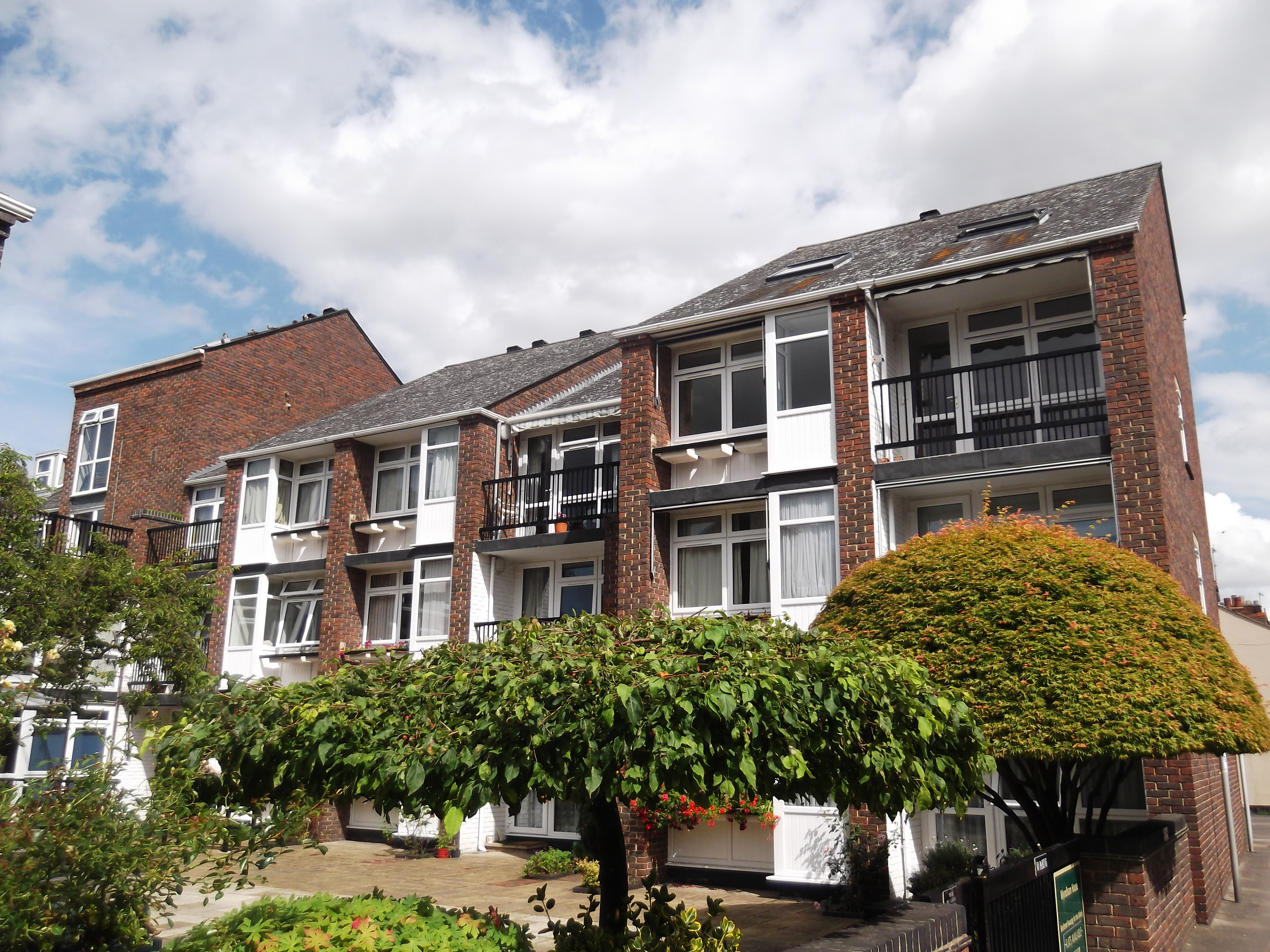
View of Wyndham House, a retirement home, from Plantation Road.

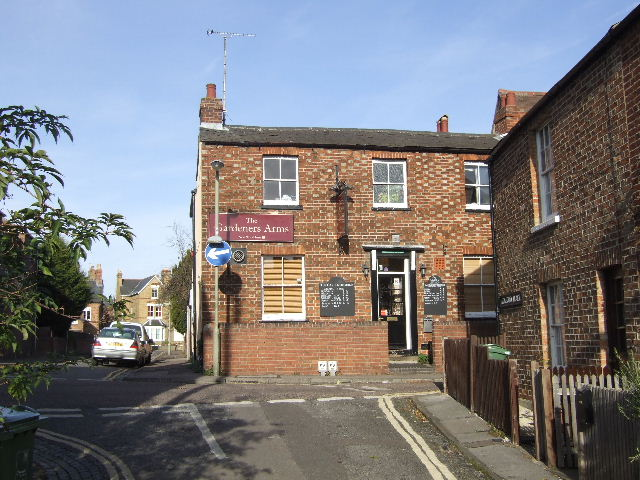
The Gardeners Arms public house in Plantation Road, from Leckford Place.

Plantation Road is a residential road in North Oxford, England, connecting Kingston Road to the west with Woodstock Road to the east.

To the north is Leckford Road and to the south is St Bernard's Road. Leckford Place crosses it halfway along. The eastern part of the road is very narrow, almost like a village lane despite now being in a city suburb.

In the past there was a plantation here, hence the name. The road was laid out with building plots by 1832. The philanthropic Oxford Cottage Improvement Company built a block of seven cottages in 1888 on the south side of the road.

The Gardener's Arms public house, at 39 Plantation Road on the corner with Leckford Place, dates from the late 1830s and has a vegetarian restaurant. The 20th-century Wyndham House, officially opened by Queen Elizabeth the Queen Mother in 1973, provides sheltered housing with 33 flats, also on a corner with Leckford Place. The Jericho Chiropractic Clinic is at 16 Plantation Road.

Towards the end of his life, the diplomat and author Sir Reader Bullard (1885–1976) lived in Plantation Road.
