= Jack Simmons (historian) =

English transport historian (1915–2000)

- Born: Jack Simmons; 30 August 1915; Isleworth, London, England
- Died: 3 September 2000 (aged 85); Wigston Magna, England
- Education: Rushmore School, Bedford; Westminster School
- Alma mater: Christ Church, Oxford
- Occupations: Railway historian, editor, university administrator
- Known for: University of Leicester professor and pro-vice-chancellor

Jack Simmons OBE (30 August 1915 – 3 September 2000) was an English transport historian and emeritus professor of history at University of Leicester, known as a specialist in railway history.

== Biography ==
Born on 30 August 1915 at Isleworth, London, Jack Simmons was the only child of Seymour Francis Simmons, a hosiery maker then serving in the Royal Fusiliers, and his wife, Katherine Lillias, daughter of Thomas Finch, a doctor from Babbacombe, Devon. His father was killed on the Somme in France in 1918. He and his mother settled after several years in Carshalton, Surrey. They continued to live together until her death in 1971. Simmons was educated at the independent Rushmore School in Bedford, at Westminster School and at Christ Church, Oxford, where he graduated in modern history in 1937. He spent a year in France and then returned to Oxford as a professor's assistant.

Medically unfit for military service in World War II, Simmons was appointed a lecturer at Christ Church in 1943, researching imperial history. His early publications included a 1945 biography of the poet Robert Southey, which led to him being elected a fellow of the Royal Society of Literature. He was much influenced in this period by his fellow Oxford historian A. L. Rowse. Simmons became in 1947 the first professor of history at University College, Leicester, which received its charter as the University of Leicester in 1957. Apart from running his own department there, Simmons also concerned himself with the college library and with the Senate publications board, precursor of Leicester University Press. Simmons was active in the campaign to win university status and described the process in his book New University (1958). He served at the university as public orator, pro-vice-chancellor, and acting vice-chancellor (in 1962). He retired from his chair at Leicester in 1975.

Another abiding interest was topography. He was behind the launch by the publishers William Collins, Sons of A New Survey of England, although this was cancelled after only three volumes. He turned to a new project, A Visual History of Britain, to which he contributed the volumes Transport (1962) and Britain and the World (1965). His Selective Guide to England, covering 130 places, appeared in 1979.

Jack Simmons died on 3 September 2000 at a nursing home in Wigston Magna, Leicestershire.

== Work ==
=== Railway history ===
Simmons had been joined at Christ Church in 1934 by Michael Robbins, a school friend from Westminster, who shared his abiding interest in railways. This tied in with Simmons's work at Leicester to set up a Victorian Studies Centre. He and Robbins launched in 1953 The Journal of Transport History, which is still published today. Simmons himself edited it until 1973. His many books in this field began with The Railways of Britain: an Historical Introduction (1961), included the meticulous "biography" of St Pancras Station (1968), and culminated in The Oxford Companion to British Railway History (1997), edited and compiled with Gordon Biddle.

Simmons was active in the foundation in 1975 of the National Railway Museum at York, where a reading room in the library was named after him. He also worked with London Transport on its new London Transport Museum in Covent Garden. In addition, he became a member of the first advisory committee of the National Museum of Photography, Film and Television in Bradford, and mounted two exhibitions on railway photography at the National Railway Museum.

Simmons became an honorary fellow of the National Museum of Science and Industry in 1993, and was awarded an OBE in the 1999 New Year Honours. A festschrift was published in 2002.

== Publications ==
- (Jointly with Margery Perham) African Discovery. London: Penguin Books. 1942.
- (Jointly with C. E. M. Joad and others) The English Counties Illustrated. London: Odhams. 1948. (the chapter on Devon)
- Livingstone and Africa. London: English Universities Press. 1955.
- St Pancras Station. London: George Allen & Unwin. 1968. ISBN 0-04385043-X.
- (As editor) Gibbs, George Henry (1971). Simmons (ed.). The Birth of the Great Western Railway. Bath: Adams & Dart. SBN 239-00101-X.
- The Railway in England and Wales 1830–1914. Leicester: Leicester University Press. 1978. ISBN 0-718511468.
- The Railway in Town and Country 1830–1914. Newton Abbott: David & Charles. 1986. ISBN 0-715386999.
- The Victorian Railway. London and New York: Thames & Hudson. 1991. ISBN 0-50025110-X.
- (As editor) Railways: An Anthology. London: Collins. 1991. ISBN 0-002156563.
