= Observatory Street =

Street in North Oxford, England

Coordinates: 51.76119°N 1.26541°W

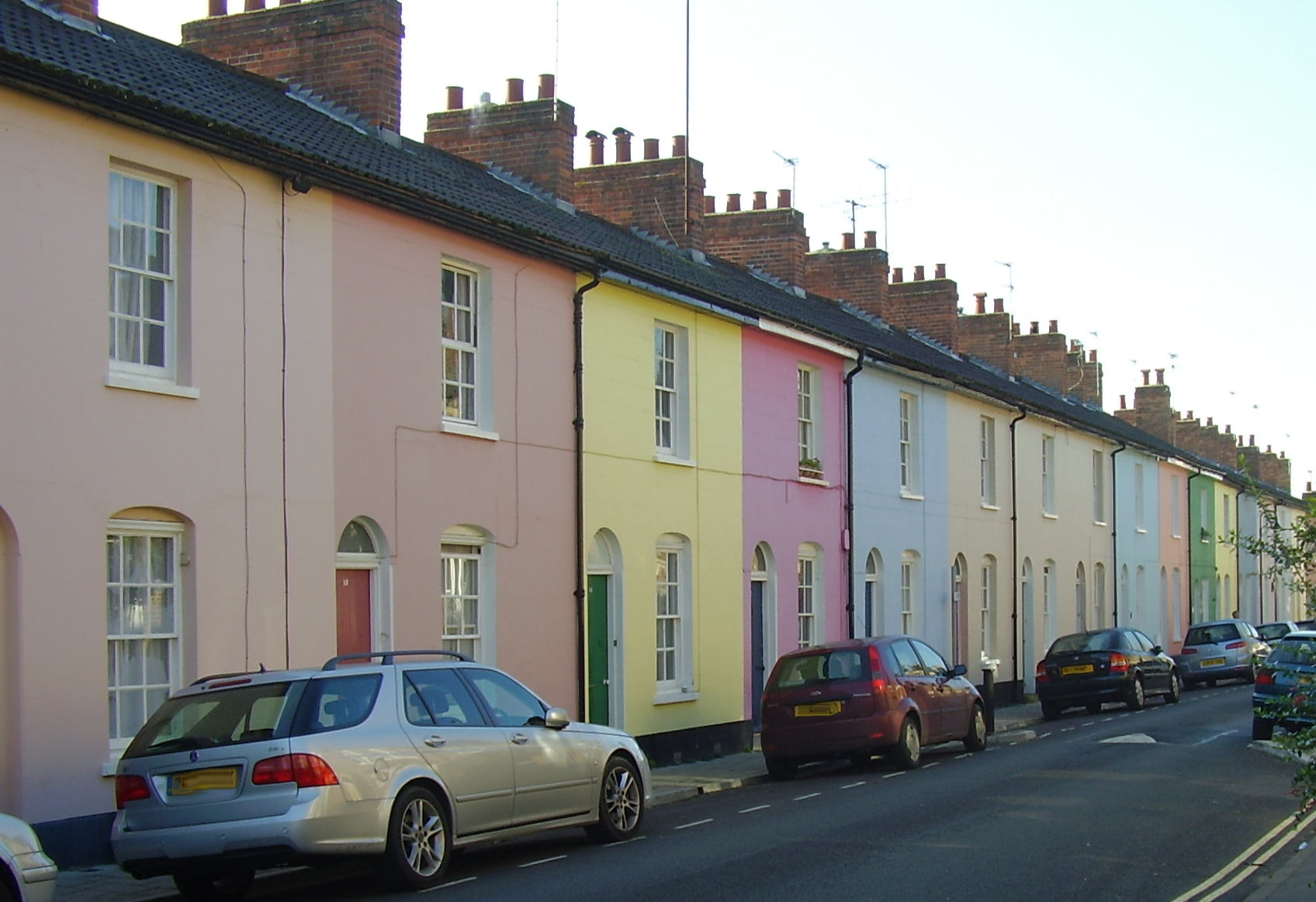
The brightly coloured terraced houses in Observatory Street

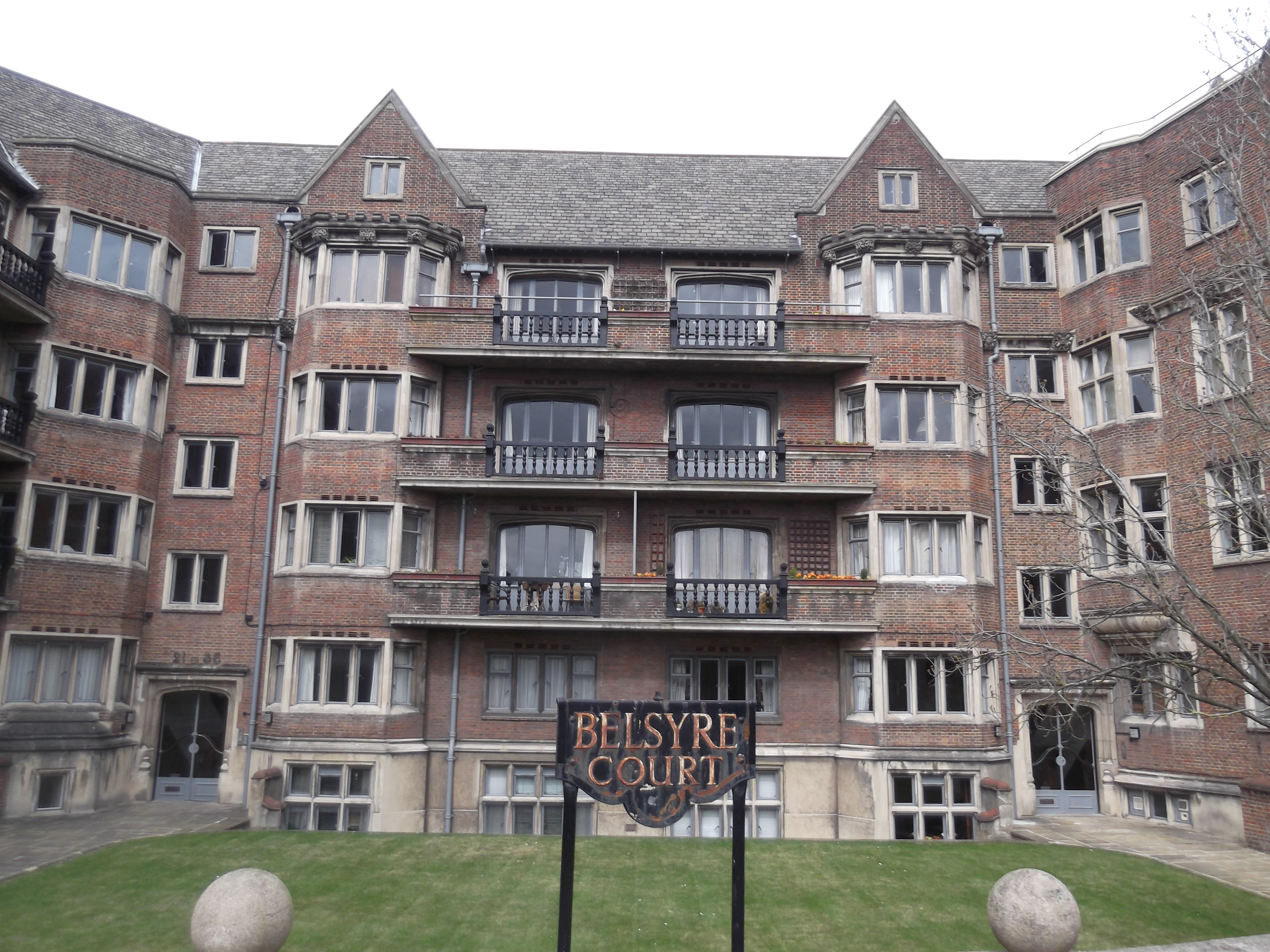
Belsyre Court, a 1936 Grade II listed apartment block at the eastern end of Observatory Street

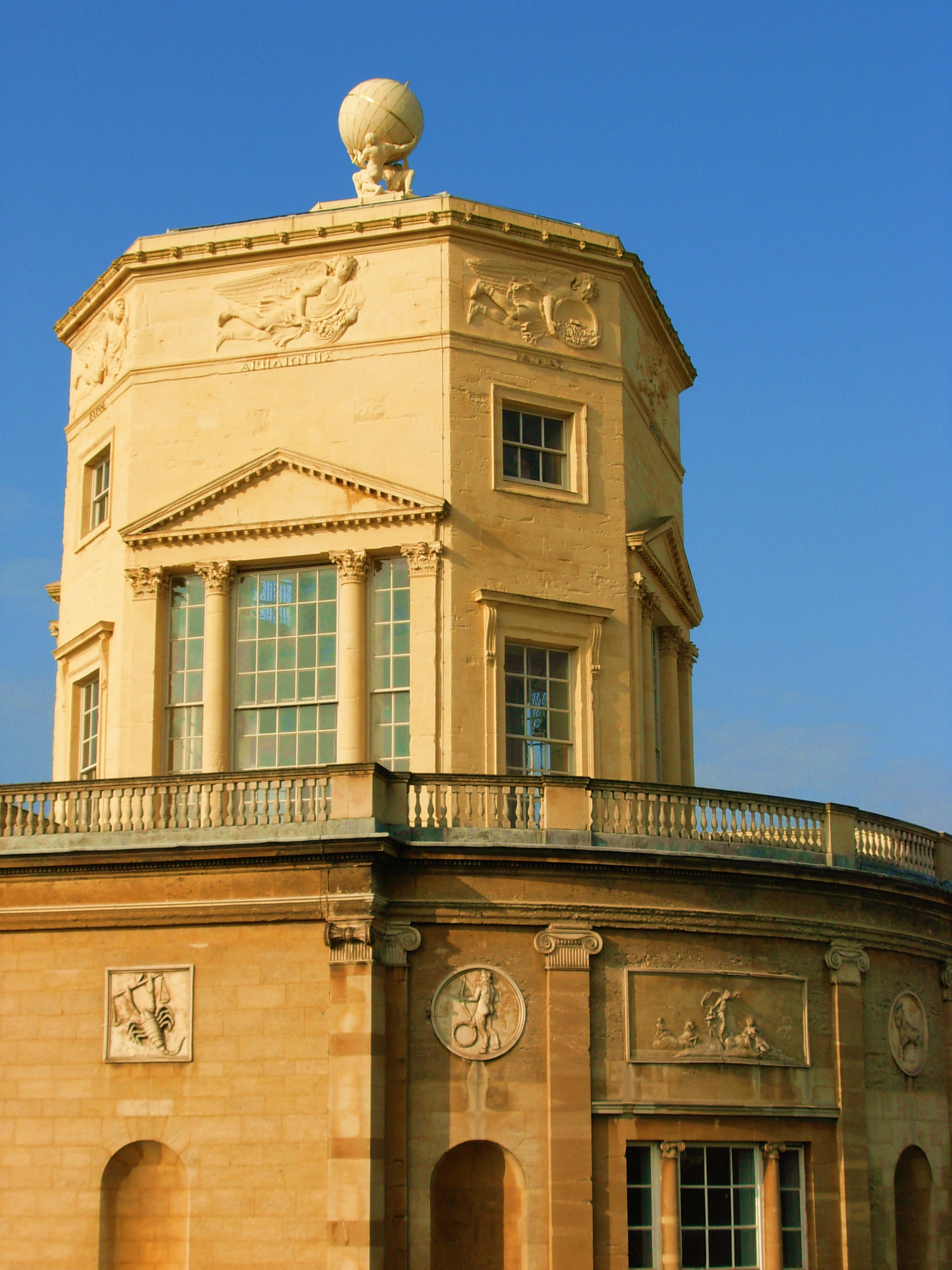
The Radcliffe Observatory to the south, after which the street is named

Observatory Street is a street in Oxford, England. It links at the eastern end Woodstock Road (opposite Bevington Road and St Anne's College and nearly opposite St Antony's College) in central North Oxford and at the western end Walton Street and the Jericho area of Oxford.

The street borders the north side of Green Templeton College, one of the Oxford University colleges, which has some student accommodation in the street. The street is named after the Radcliffe Observatory (completed in 1794), which now forms a centrepiece for the College. To the north is St Bernard's Road. The street lies within the Walton Manor Conservation Area and as such is of interest for protection by the Oxford Preservation Trust.

Adelaide Street branches off Observatory Street partway along and runs parallel to the north at the western end, also connecting with Walton Street.

== History ==
Observatory Street, developed from 1834, mainly consists of terraced houses directly on the street, many characterized by brightly painted stuccoed fronts in a variety of colours, especially on the south side of the street, which is very late Georgian. Once built as small dwellings for poorer inhabitants of Oxford, often workers on early railway and canal construction, the houses now command high prices because of the central location of the street, within easy walking distance of the city centre and close to the Oxford University Humanities and Mathematics site on the Radcliffe Observatory Quarter.

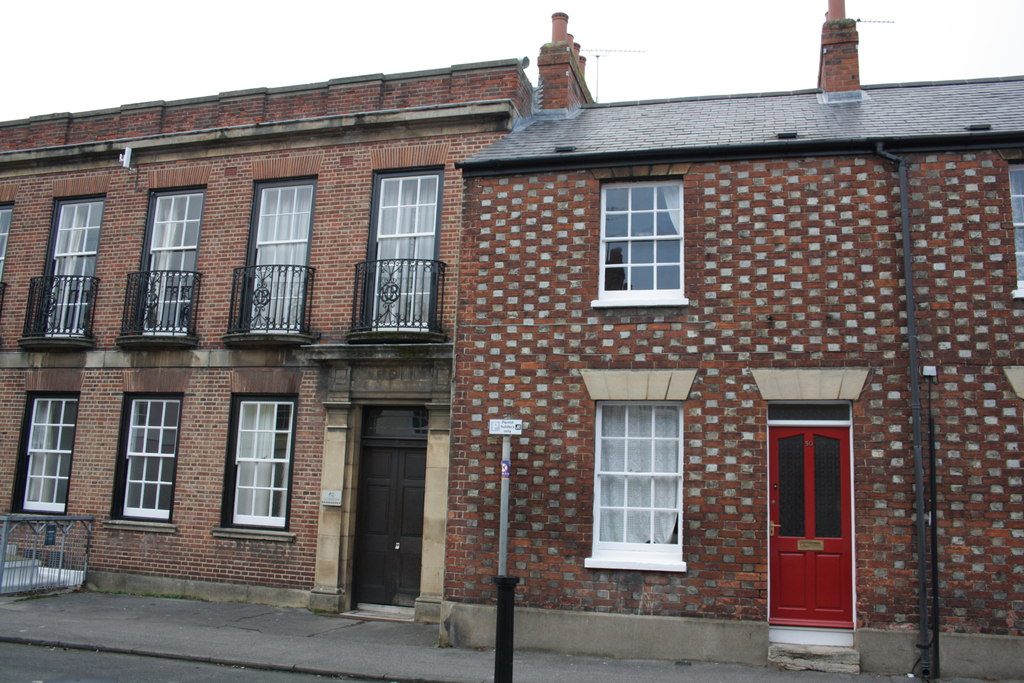
Lord Napier House (left) and 50 Observatory Street (right)

Lord Napier House is a large house and former Hall's Oxford Brewery public house, of historic interest in Observatory Street. The original building was erected in 1871 but it was replaced in 1930.

The former St Paul's Vicarage was built in 1905 at 1A Observatory Street. The house includes a stone Latin inscription:

A. M. D. G. [Ad Maiorem Dei Gloriam]

POSUIT
EP[ISCOPU]S RADINGENSIS
AD XVI KAL SEP MCMV

This translates as "To the greater glory of God, the Bishop of Reading laid [this stone] on 17 August 1905". St Paul's Church, nearby in Walton Street, ceased to function as a church in 1964. Shortly after this, the house ceased to act as its vicarage.

Belsyre Court is located on the north side at the east end of Observatory Street, Woodstock Road, and the south side at the east end of St Bernard's Road. It was designed by Ernest R. Barrow and built in 1936. Belsyre Court was the first large block of flats in Oxford.
