= List of ambassadors of the United Kingdom to Algeria =

The ambassador of the United Kingdom to Algeria is the United Kingdom's foremost diplomatic representative to the People's Democratic Republic of Algeria, and head of the UK's diplomatic mission in Algiers.

== Ambassadors ==
- 1962–1964: Trefor Evans
- 1964–1965: Sir Thomas Bromley
- 1965–1968: No representation
- 1968–1971: Martin Le Quesne
- 1971–1973: Ronnald Burroughs
- 1974–1977: John Robinson
- 1977–1981: Richard Faber
- 1981–1984: Benjamin Strachan
- 1984–1987: Sir Alan Munro
- 1987–1989: Patrick Eyers
- 1990–1994: Christopher Battiscombe
- 1994–1995: Christopher Crabbie
- 1995–1996: Peter Marshall
- 1996–1999: Francois Gordon
- 1999–2001: William Sinton
- 2001–2002: Richard Edis
- 2002–2004: Graham Hand
- 2004–2005: Brian Edward Stewart
- 2005–2007: Andrew Tesoriere
- 2007–2010: Andrew Henderson
- 2010–2014: Martyn Roper
- 2014–2017: Andrew Noble
- 2017–2020: Barry Lowen
- 2021–2025: Sharon Wardle
- 2025–present: James Downer
