= Institute of Commonwealth Studies, Oxford =

The Institute of Commonwealth Studies was a graduate research centre of the University of Oxford which was in existence between 1945 and 1986.

== History ==
The last year of Sir Reader Bullard as Director, 1956, saw the alteration of the Institute’s name from Institute of Colonial Studies to Institute of Commonwealth Studies, reflecting changes in Britain’s imperial status. The Institute of Colonial Studies had been established in 1945. Its antecedent had been the training courses at the University of Oxford for both the probationers of the Indian Civil Service and the Colonial Services (such as the Tropical African Service Course). More directly it had developed out of the University’s response to a proposed expansion, to be made in the post-war years, in the training of colonial civil servants. These proposals were eventually published as the Report on Post-War Training for the Colonial Service (Devonshire Report, 1946). Much of the drafting of the report had been undertaken by Margery Perham, then Reader in Colonial Administration at Oxford, who had also been influential in establishing the Committee for Colonial Studies, the Institute’s supervising body, in 1943. The Institute was set up under the directorship of Perham, assisted by Col. F.B.H. Drummond as administrative secretary who also acted as secretary to the Committee. In 1948 both Perham and Drummond resigned and the Institute’s affairs were placed in the hands of a Committee of Management, consisting of the Beit Professor of Commonwealth History (then, of the History of the British Empire), the Registrar and the Reader in Colonial Administration, who continued to run the Institute until Bullard's appointment as Director in 1951. The Institute, initially located at 10 Bardwell Road, Oxford, moved in 1948 to premises in South Parks Road, in 1951 to 10 Keble Road, and in 1961 to Queen Elizabeth House (21 St Giles). It continued in existence until 1986, when it was amalgamated with the Institute of Agricultural Economics and Queen Elizabeth House to form the International Development Centre, a centre for international Development Studies. In 2005, the centre moved to Mansfield Road and became the Oxford Department of International Development.

== Past directors ==
Directors of the Institute of Commonwealth Studies (to 1956, of Colonial Studies):

1945–48 Dame Margery Perham
1948–51 Committee of Management
1951–56 Sir Reader Bullard
1957–61 Elizabeth Millicent Chilver
1961–68 A.F.M. Madden
1968–78 P.P. Streeten
1978–79 K.B. Griffin.
