= Wyndham House, Oxford =

Retirement home in North Oxford, England

Wyndham House
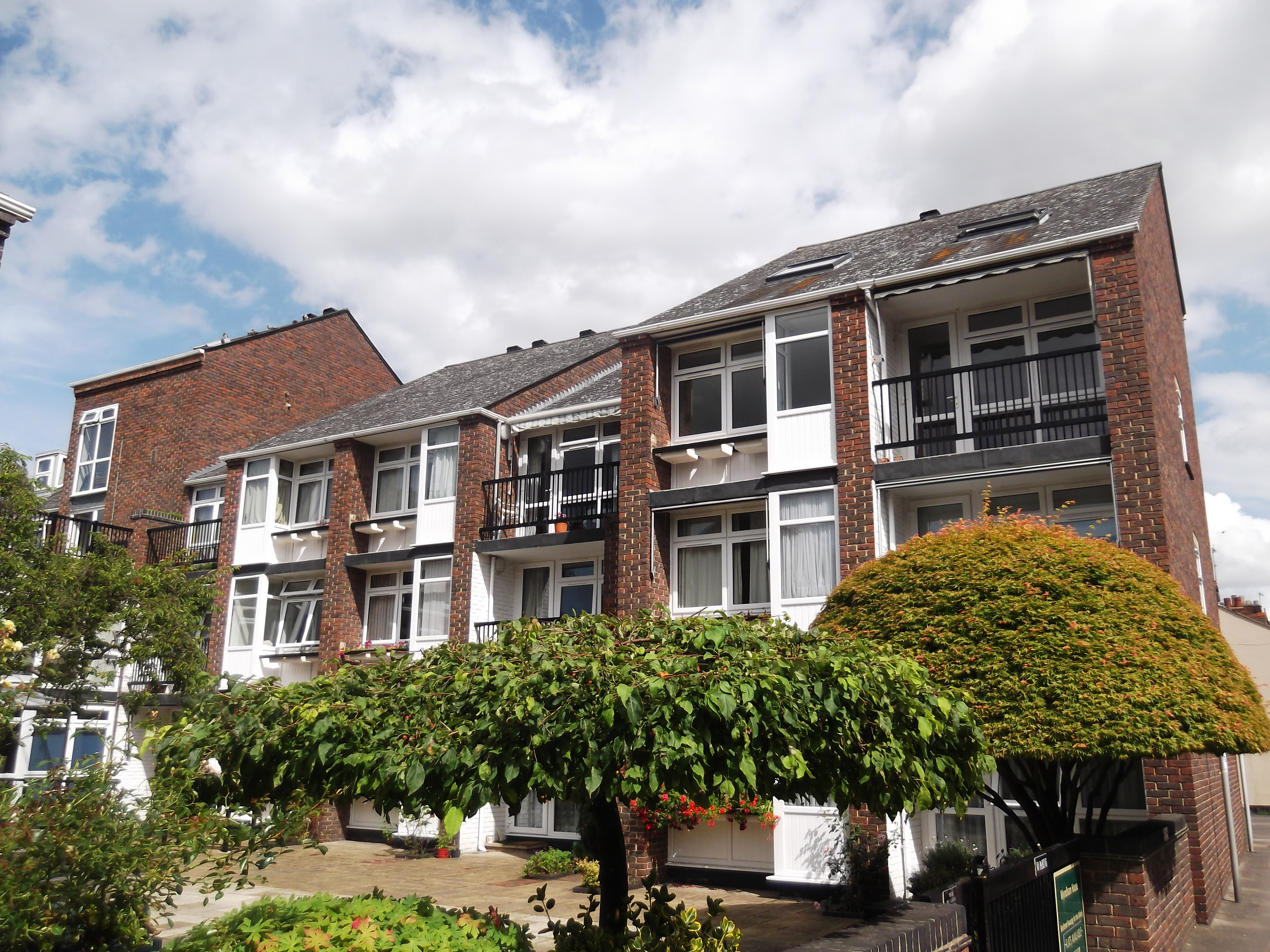
- View of Wyndham House from Plantation Road
- Interactive map of the Wyndham House area

General information
- Type: Retirement home
- Location: Plantation Road, Oxford, United Kingdom
- Coordinates: 51.7627°N 1.2670°W
- Completed: 1973
- Opening: June 1973 by Queen Elizabeth The Queen Mother
- Management: Anchor Hanover Group; Wyndham Housing Association

Technical details
- Floor count: 3

Website
- www.hanover.org.uk

Wyndham House is a retirement home in North Oxford, England.

Wyndham House was officially opened in June 1973 by Queen Elizabeth The Queen Mother. Also in attendance were Fred Ingram, the Lord Mayor of Oxford, who was involved with the scheme to establish the project. Others present included Lady Jean Rankin, a lady-in-waiting, and the Duke and Duchess of Marlborough.

The facility replaced a home for elderly people in Banbury Road in North Oxford. The site was provided by St John's College, Oxford, who historically owned much of the land in the area, locally called Walton Manor. Originally, Wyndham House was a project of the British Red Cross although the connection with the Red Cross ceased in 1976. The home was previously run by the Wyndham Housing Association. It is now run by the Anchor Hanover Group.

Wyndham House is on Plantation Road and also abuts Leckford Place off Leckford Road. Opposite on Leckford Place are part of d'Overbroeck's College (for Year 7 to Year 11) and a public house on the corner with Plantation Road, The Gardener's Arms.
