= Sharon Wardle =

British diplomat

Her Excellency Sharon Wardle
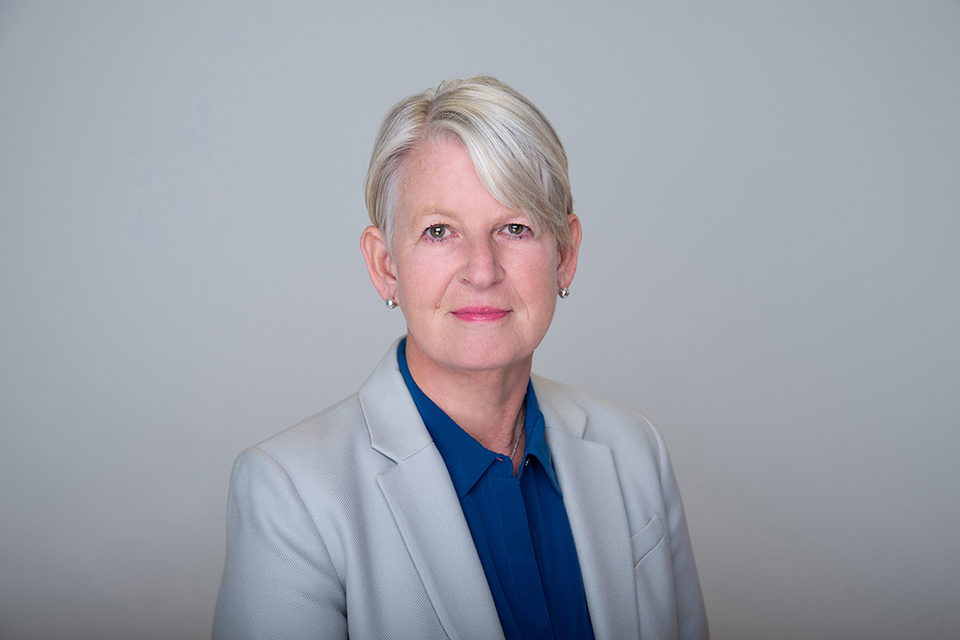

British Ambassador to Algeria
- In office January 2021 – January 2025
- Monarchs: Elizabeth II; Charles III
- Prime Minister: Boris Johnson; Liz Truss; Rishi Sunak; Keir Starmer
- Preceded by: Barry Lowen
- Succeeded by: James Downer

British High Commissioner to The Gambia (Note: At the time she entered office, The Gambia was not a member of the Commonwealth. In February 2018, The Gambia under the government of Adama Barrow joined the Commonwealth, so her status as an ambassador changed to that of a High Commissioner.)
- In office 2017 – August 2020
- Monarch: Elizabeth II
- Prime Minister: Theresa May; Boris Johnson
- Preceded by: Colin Crorkin
- Succeeded by: David Belgrove

Personal details
- Born: 1960s
- Spouse: Peter Millman
- Occupation: Diplomat

Sharon Wardle (born 1964/5) is a British diplomat. She became the Ambassador to the Gambia in 2017. After the negotiations were complete to allow the Gambia to rejoin the Commonwealth, she became the High Commissioner to The Gambia from 2018 to 2020. From 2021 until 2025, she served as the Ambassador to Algeria.

== Career ==
Wardle became a diplomat when she joined the Foreign, Commonwealth and Development Office in 1985.

She was the Ambassador to The Gambia from 2017, taking over from Colin Crorkin. She became ambassador at a time when the Gambia had left the Commonwealth. At her first meeting with the President she assured him that the UK was keen for the Gambia's application to rejoin to proceed.

In January 2020, she was acting on behalf of Queen Elizabeth II, giving the Order of the British Empire as a result the 2019 Special Honours. She awarded an OBE to Fatou Baldeh in recognition of her valuable efforts regarding advocating to ethnic communities in Scotland and a KBE to Professor Tumani Corrah.

She was succeeded as the British ambassador in the Gambia by David Belgrove in August 2020.

In 2021, she became the Ambassador to Algeria. She took over from Barry Lowen. Lowen became the ambassador in Mali. She noted that it had been a difficult three years for the country but that she was optimistic concerning Gambia's future.

Wardle was noted for stating the UK's support for the international recognition of the emerging country of Western Sahara in 2022. Wardle's views on Algeria are reported in the local press. One report of a trip she made to Batna noted her liking for the local stew and flatbread Chakhchoukha and the Roman city and World Heritage Site of Timgad.

== Notes ==
Diplomatic posts
Preceded by Colin Crorkin	British Ambassador / High Commissioner to The Gambia; 2017–2020	Succeeded by David Belgrove
Preceded by Barry Lowen	British Ambassador to Algeria; 2021–2025	Succeeded by James Downer
