= St Bernard's Road =

Road in North Oxford, England

Coordinates: 51.7621°N 1.2659°W

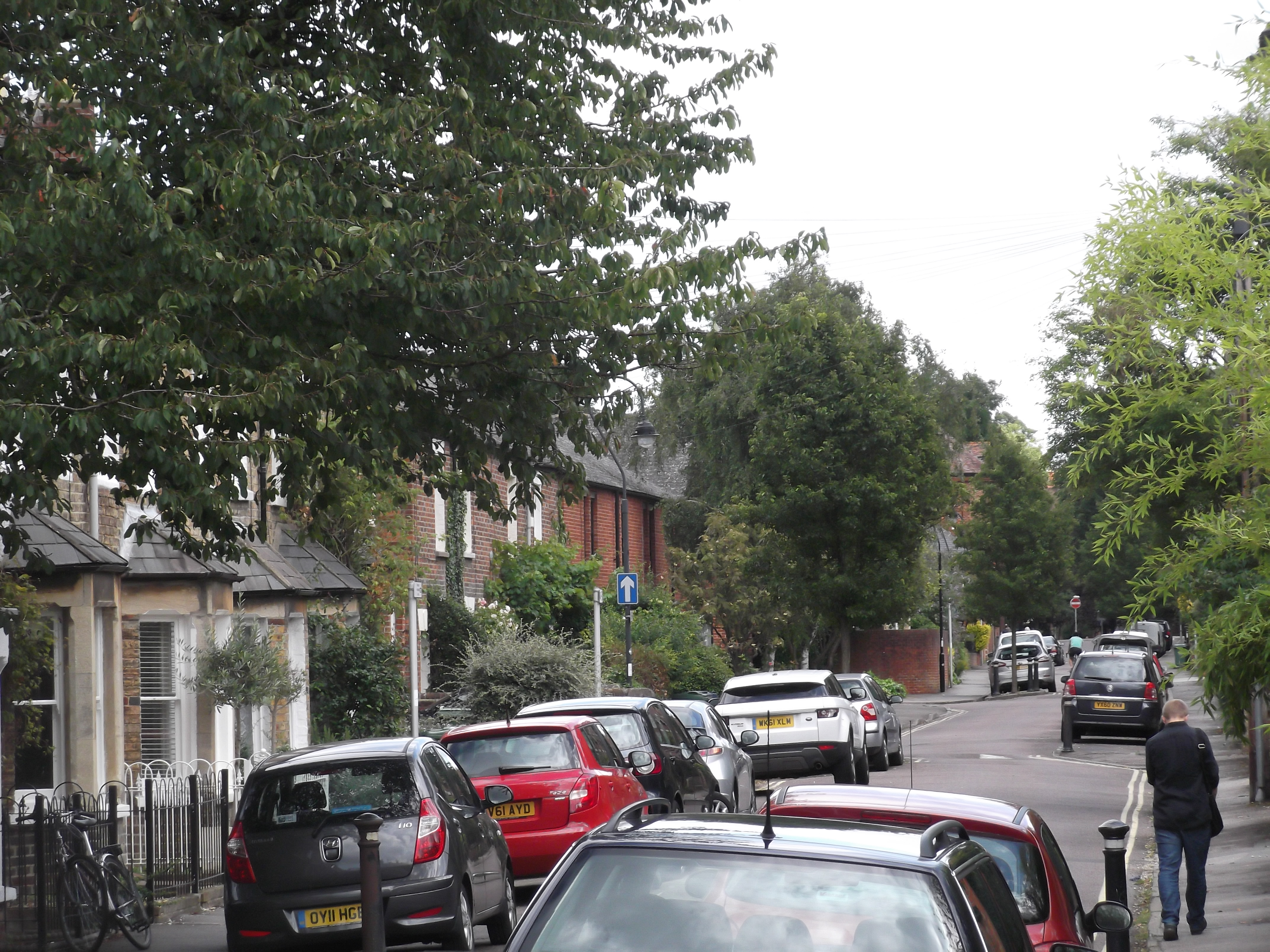
View east along St Bernard's Road from close to the junction with Walton Street.

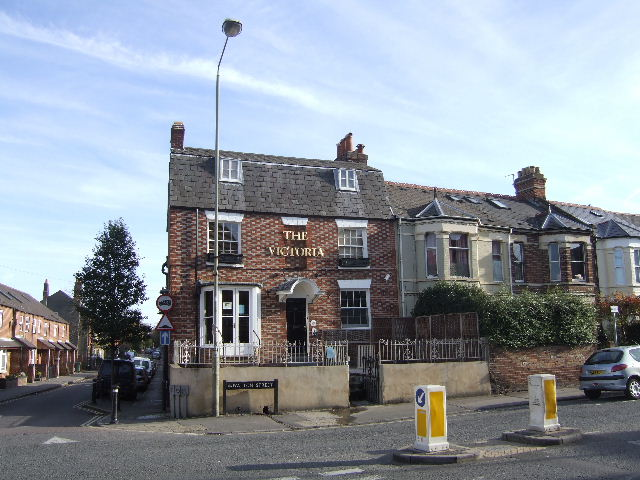
The Victoria public house on the corner of St Bernard's Road and Walton Street, with a view east down St Bernard's Road on the left.

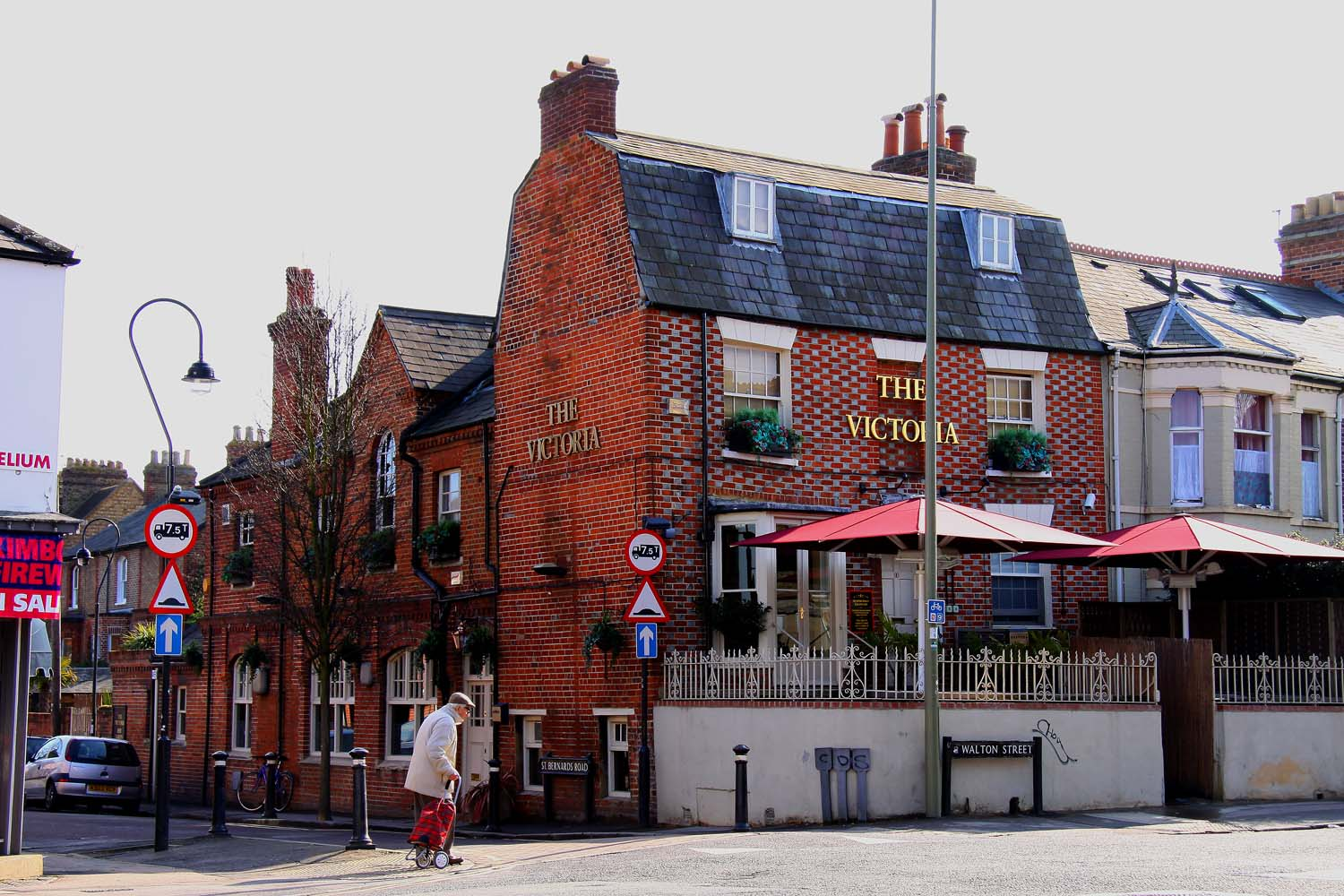
The corner of St Bernard's Road and Walton Street (including the Victoria pub) from the end of Walton Well Road.

St Bernard's Road is a residential road in North Oxford, England, connecting the southern end of Kingston Road and the northern end of Walton Street, at the junction with Walton Well Road, to the west with Woodstock Road, opposite Bevington Road, to the east.

To the north is Plantation Road and to the south is Observatory Street. Leckford Place leads north halfway along. The road is one-way from west to east, with traffic calming constrictions. The houses are mainly terraced with some semi-detached.

At the eastern end on the south side is a Grade II listed block of flats, Belsyre Court, built in 1936.

== History ==
This location was part of the route taken by King Charles I with his cavaliers and 6,000 troops when he escaped at night from Oxford on 3 June 1644 during the Civil War. The road was previously known as Horse and Jockey Road (or Lane), after the Horse and Jockey Inn, formerly on the corner with Woodstock Road. It then became known as St John's Road, after St John's College, but there was some confusion with St John Street to the south, so at the request of residents it was given its current name in 1961. St Bernard's College, a former Cistercian institution that was closed in 1539 after the Dissolution of the Monasteries, was the name of the college from which St John's College developed.

Some houses were demolished to make way for the St John's College development of Arthur Garrard Close off St Bernard's Road, named after the bursar at the College from 1949–67.
