= Belsyre Court =

Listed block of flats in Oxford, England

Coordinates: 51.762121°N 1.263889°W

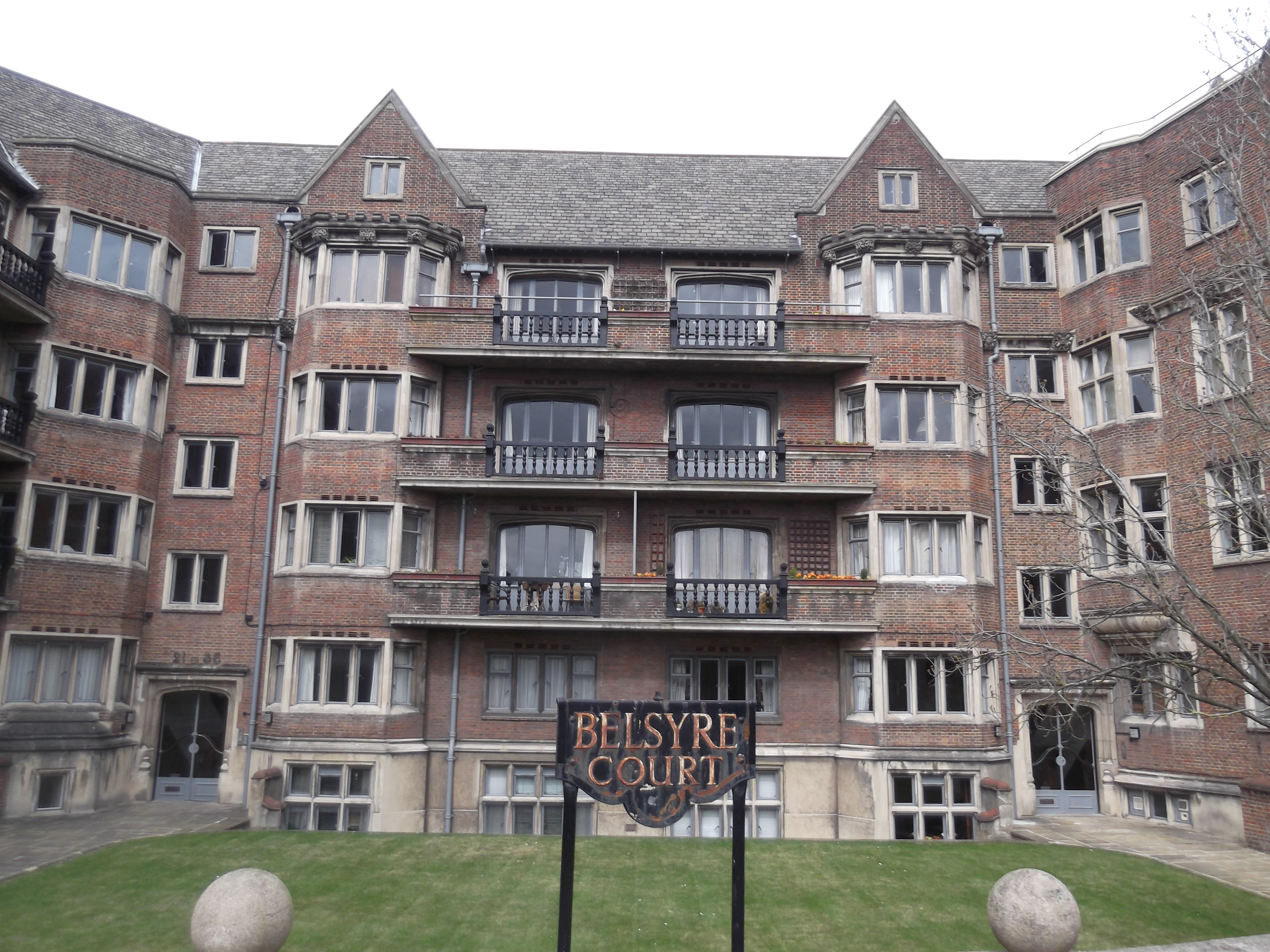
Belsyre Court courtyard on Observatory Street in North Oxford

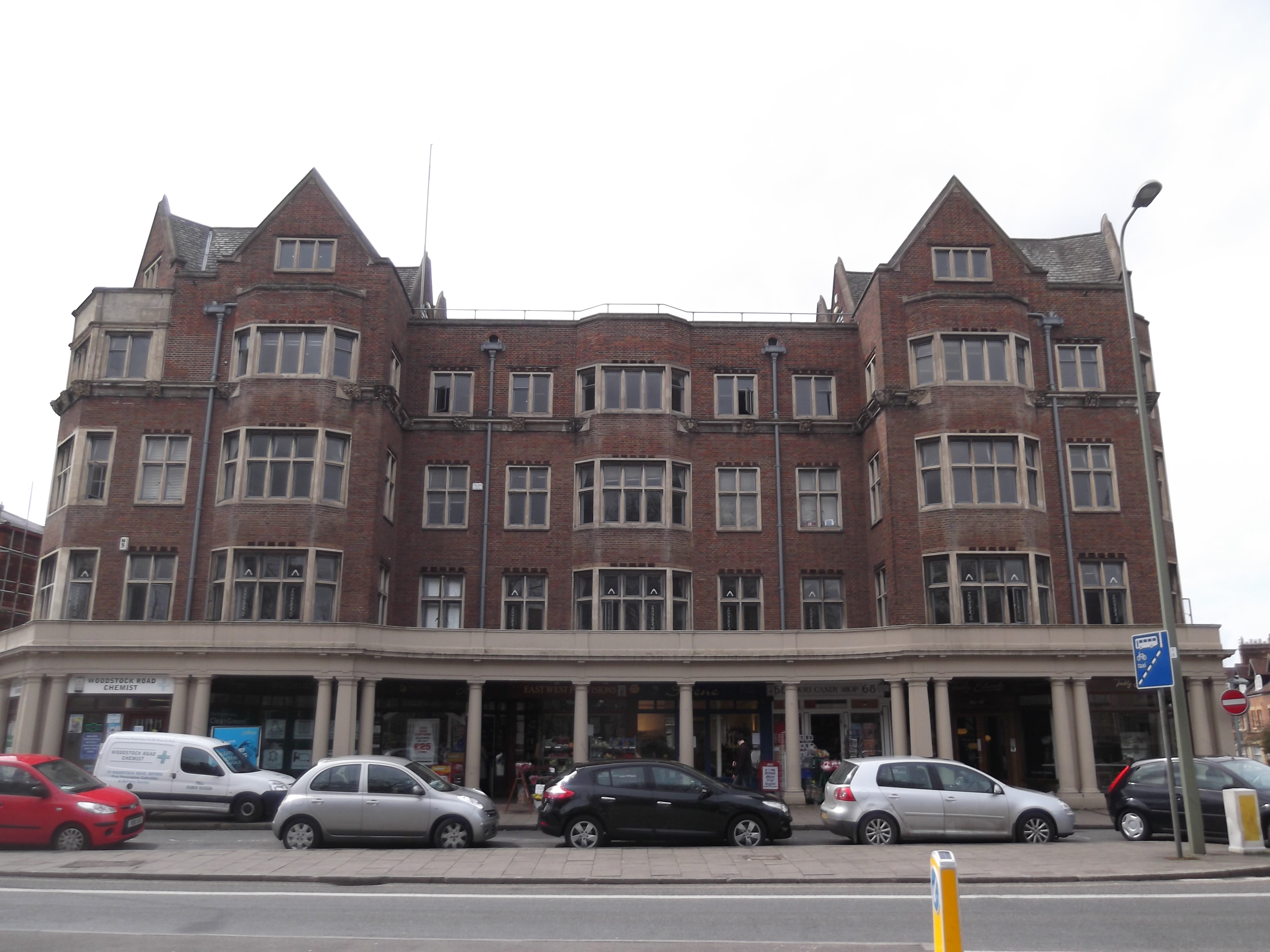
View from Woodstock Road

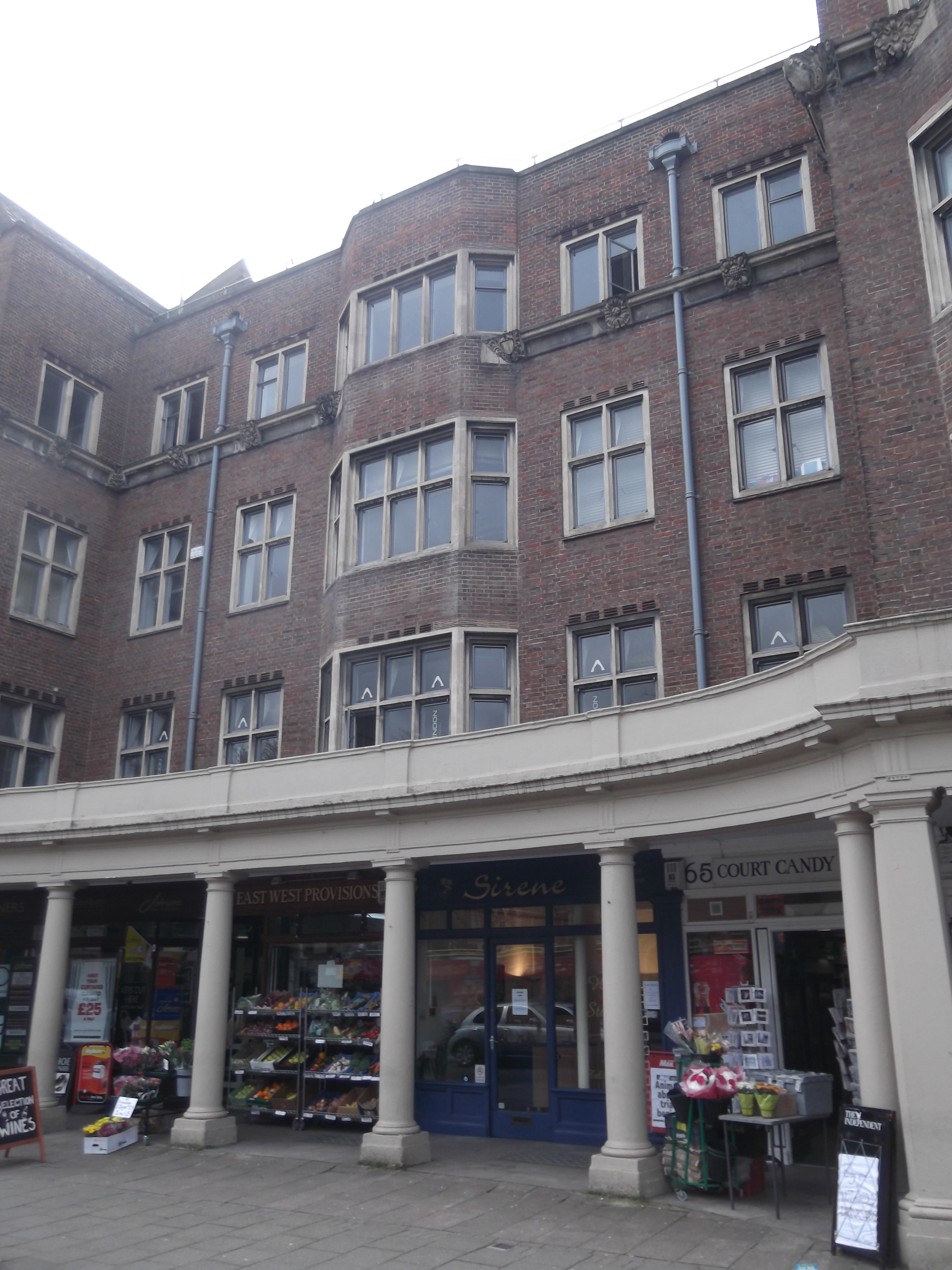
Belsyre Court shops on Woodstock Road

Belsyre Court is a listed early 20th-century block of flats in Oxford, England.

The building is located on the south side at the east end of St Bernard's Road, the west side of Woodstock Road, and the north side at the east end of Observatory Street in North Oxford. There is a small row of shops in a colonnade with a parking area on the Woodstock Road side.

The site, part of the St John's College North Oxford estate, was first considered for a theatre. In 1932, a mixed-development scheme of shops, offices, and flats, was selected. An initial design by J. C. Leeds was rejected. The final block was designed by Ernest R. Barrow and built in 1936. Belsyre Court was the first large block of flats in Oxford. It was built of brick in a Jacobethan style. An Inland Revenue office was located here from 1936 until the early 1990s.

The building was Grade II listed in October 2008.
