= Leckford =

Village and parish in Hampshire, England

Coordinates: 51.137269°N 1.464659°W

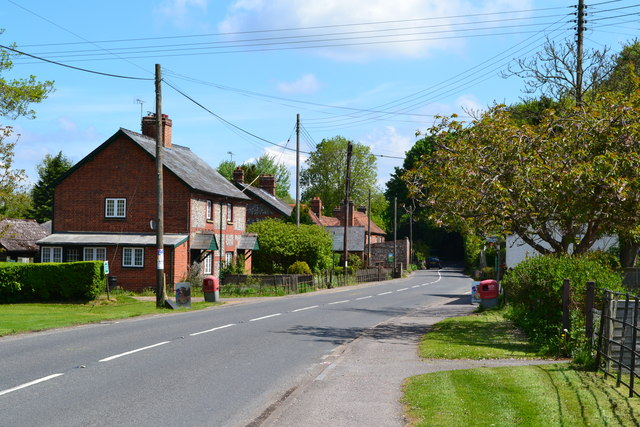
- A3057 through Leckford village centre

- Location within Hampshire
- Population: 133 (2011 census)
- OS grid reference: SU374377
- Civil parish: Leckford
- District: Test Valley
- Shire county: Hampshire
- Region: South East
- Country: England
- Sovereign state: United Kingdom
- Post town: STOCKBRIDGE
- Postcode district: SO20
- Dialling code: 01264
- Police: Hampshire and Isle of Wight
- Fire: Hampshire and Isle of Wight
- Ambulance: South Central
- UK Parliament: Romsey

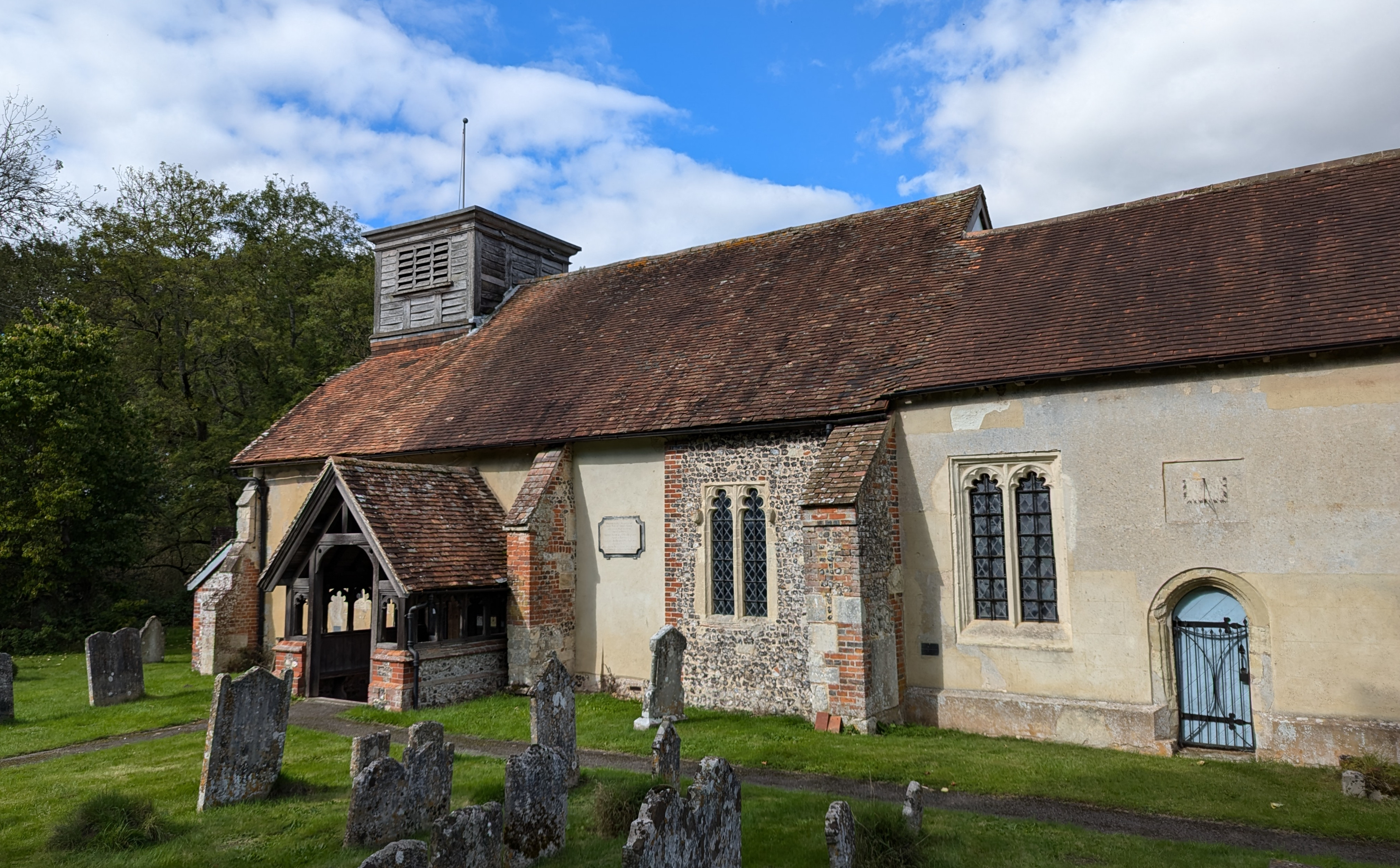
The church of St. Nicholas at Leckford, Hampshire, England. September 2024.

Leckford is a village and civil parish in Hampshire, England. It lies on the eastern bank of the River Test just to the south of its confluence with the River Anton, to the east of Longstock and south of Chilbolton.

The parish church, St Nicholas's, has a 13th-century core, rebuilt in the 16th century and much restored since. Leckford was on the Andover Canal, which later became the Andover and Redbridge Railway, but did not have a station. The route through Leckford today is used by the Test Way long-distance footpath. In the Second World War, Leckford shared a boundary with Chilbolton Aerodrome, which was used by the RAF and later by US Army Air Forces.

The parish contains the Leckford Estate, owned by the John Lewis Partnership.

== See also ==
- Leckford Road, Oxford
