= Colin Crorkin =

Colin Wynn Crorkin, OBE (born 31 January 1957) was the UK's Ambassador to the Gambia from 2014 to 2017.

== Early life ==
Crorkin was born in Edinburgh and attended the Rowlinson School in Sheffield.

== Career ==
He joined the Foreign Office in 1975. He became ambassador to the Gambia in June 2014, having been appointed in early January 2014. Gambia had only recently withdrawn from the Commonwealth.

In 2018 Sharon Wardle became the new ambassador.

== Personal life ==
He married Joanne Finnamore in 1991. They have two sons and one daughter.

Diplomatic posts
Preceded by David Morley	British Ambassador to The Gambia; June 2014 - 2017	Succeeded by Sharon Wardle
