= Alastair Maitland =

British diplomat

Alastair George Maitland CBE (30 January 1916 – 21 December 2011) was a British diplomat.

== Biography ==
He was born in Kampala, Uganda, the son of a colonial service botanist. He was educated at the University of Edinburgh.

Maitland served as a diplomat in Canada, Jerusalem and the United States, culminating in his appointment as consul-general in Boston. After retiring, he settled in Boston, Massachusetts, with his wife Betty. He then married Hazel Porter and retired to Heath, Massachusetts to live out the rest of his life.

== See also ==
- List of consuls-general of the United Kingdom in Boston
