= Leckford Road =

Road in North Oxford, England

Coordinates: 51.7637°N 1.2662°W

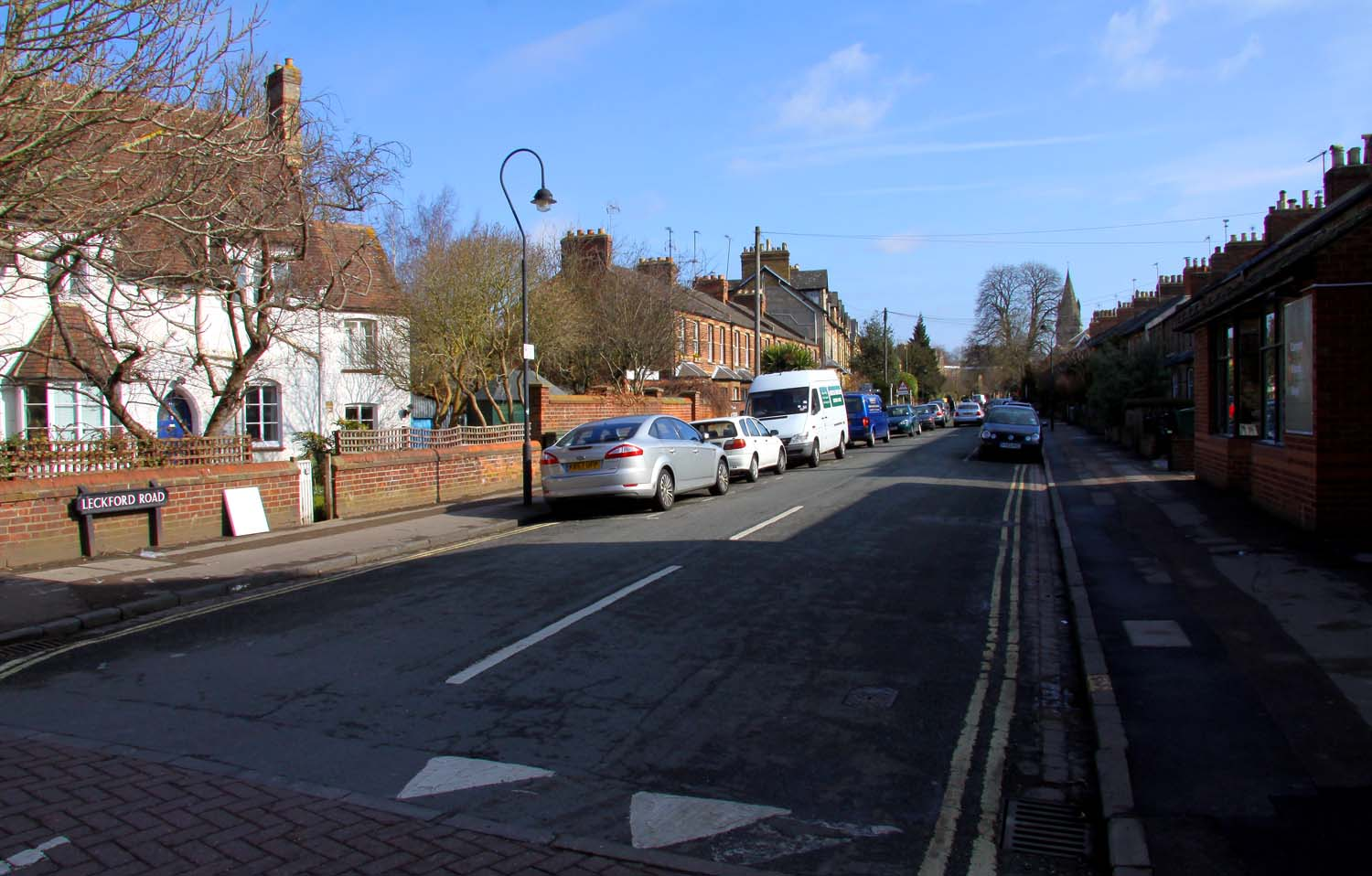
Leckford Road from the western end at the junction with Kingston Road, looking east with the spire of St Philip and St James Church in the distance.

Leckford Road is a road in North Oxford, England. It runs between Kingston Road to the west and Woodstock Road to the east.

== Location ==
To the north halfway along is a junction with Warnborough Road. To the south, Leckford Place links with Plantation Road. Opposite the east end on the Woodstock Road is the Victorian St Philip and St James Church with its dominating spire, now used as the Oxford Centre for Mission Studies.

== History ==
The houses in Leckford Road were leased between 1873 and 1885 as part of the St John's College North Oxford estate.

The most famous resident of the road was Bill Clinton (who later served as US president between 1993 and 2001). He lived in 46 Leckford Road while studying as a Rhodes Scholar at University College, Oxford from 1968 to 1970. He shared the house with Frank Aller, David Satter, and Strobe Talbott (later an editor of Time magazine).

Wyndham House, a retirement home that backs onto Leckford Road on land originally owned by St John's College, Oxford, was officially opened by Queen Elizabeth the Queen Mother in 1973.

Leckford Road is the former location of St Philip and St James Church of England Aided Primary School ("Phil and Jim" or "Pip and Jim"), now in Navigation Way. The buildings have been converted for new use as Leckford Place School, part of d'Overbroeck's College, an independent day school for boys and girls between 11 and 16.

== Gallery ==
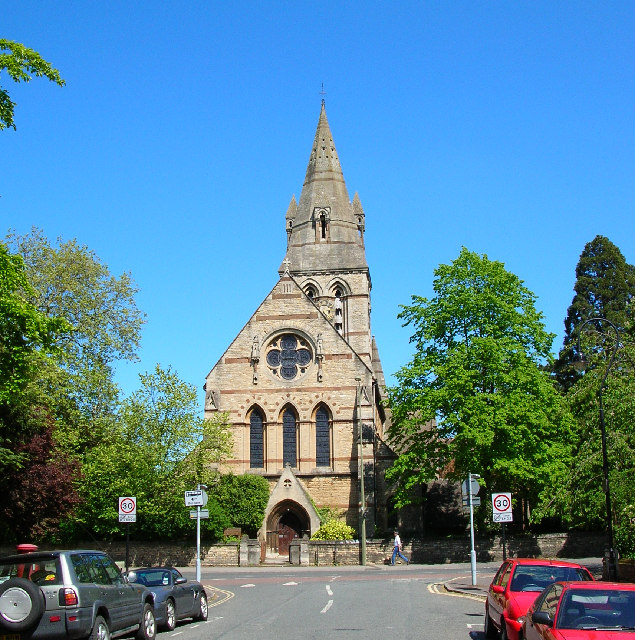
View east along Leckford Road to the former church St Philip and St James Church on Woodstock Road, now the Oxford Centre for Mission Studies.

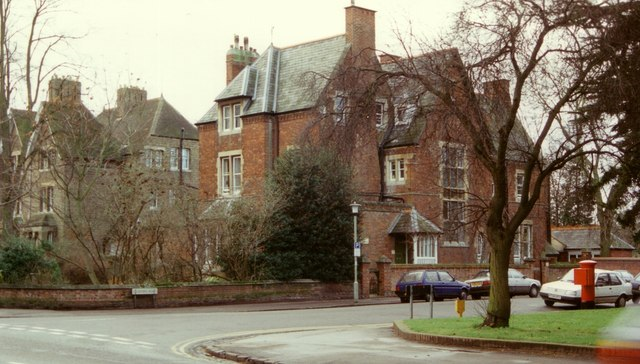
Woodlands Nursing Home at the eastern end of Leckford Road on the corner with Woodstock Road.

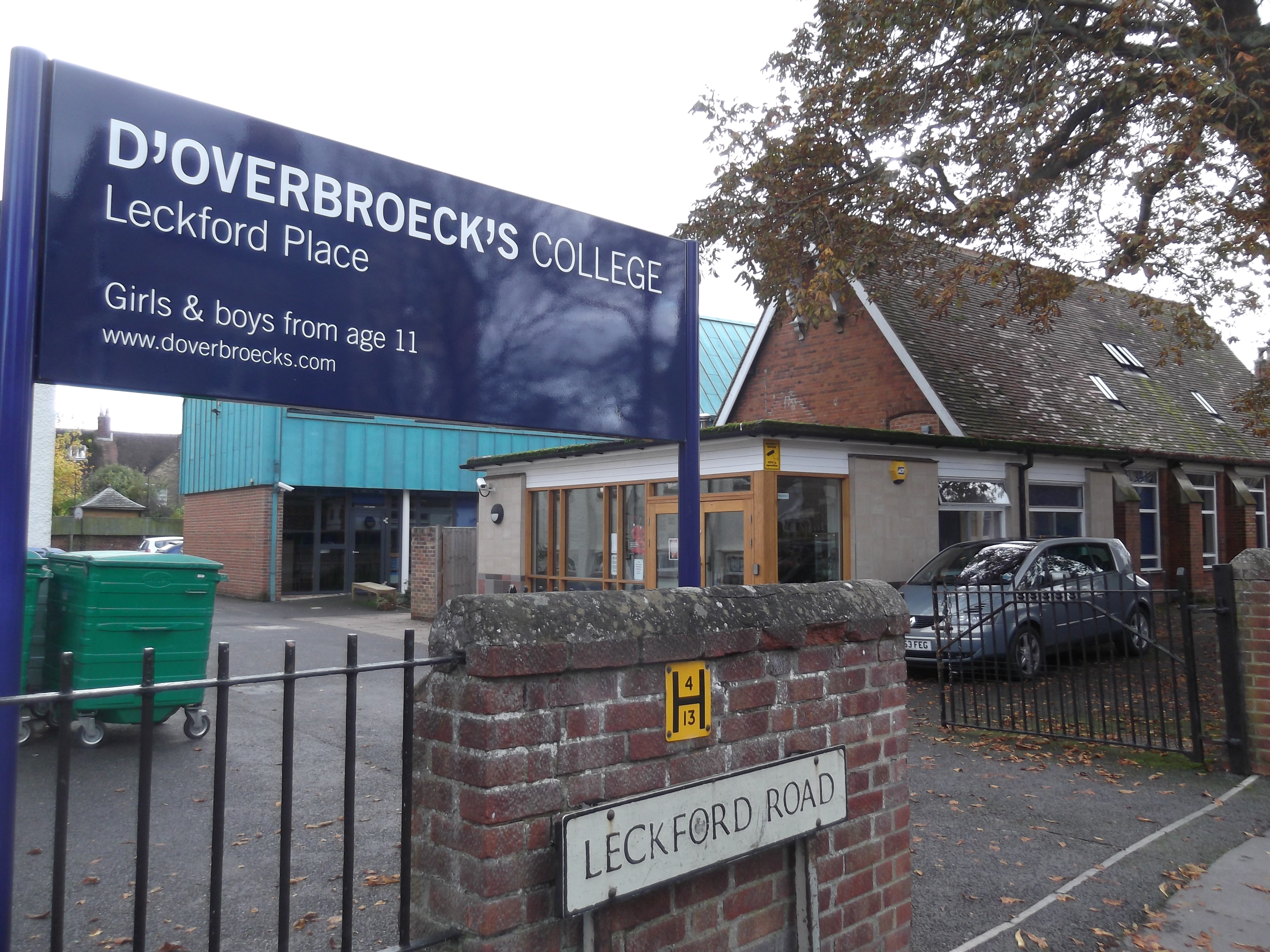
The d'Overbroeck's College Leckford Place site on the south side of Leckford Road, east of Leckford Place.

President Bill Clinton, a former resident of 46 Leckford Road.

== See also ==
- Leckford, a village in Hampshire
- Marian Allen, writer
