= Robert Marett (diplomat) =

British author and diplomat (1907–1981)

Sir Robert Hugh Kirk Marett, KCMG, OBE, FRAI (1907–1981) was a British writer, businessman, civil servant, and diplomat. He was the Consul-General of the United Kingdom to Boston from 1955 to 1958, and the British Ambassador to Peru from 1963 to 1967.

== Selected works ==
- Marett, R. H. K. (1934). Archaeological tours from Mexico city: a guide to the principal archaeological sites of the pre-Spanish civilizations of Mexico that can conveniently be visited from the capital. London: Simpkin, Marshall, ltd.
- Marett, R. H. K. (1939). An Eye-witness of Mexico. Oxford: Oxford University Press.
- Marett, R. H. K. (1968). Through the back door: an inside view of Britain's overseas information services. Oxford: Pergamon Press. ISBN 978-0080037622.
- Marett, R. H. K. (1969). Peru. London: Benn. ISBN 978-0510388560.
- Marett, R. H. K. (1971). Mexico. New York: Walker. ISBN 978-0802721242.
- Marett, R. H. K. (1973). Latin America: British trade and investment. London: Charles Knight. ISBN 978-0853141914.
