= Gerald Campbell =

British diplomat

Campbell in 1941.

Sir Gerald Campbell, GCMG (1879–1964) was a British diplomat.

He served as British High Commissioner to Canada from 16 May 1938 to 1941. He then was transferred in 1941 by Winston Churchill to serve as British consul general to the United States, in order to improve relations between Britain and the United States during World War II. He had previously held this position in New York City from 1931 to 1938. He became very popular in the United States, especially for his "after-dinner stories".

His autobiography, Of True Experience, was published in 1948.
