= List of diplomats of the United Kingdom to the Gambia =

The high commissioner of the United Kingdom to The Gambia is the United Kingdom's foremost diplomatic representative in the Republic of The Gambia.

Until 2013, The Gambia was a member of the Commonwealth and the United Kingdom's representative was a high commissioner. On 2 October 2013, the Gambian government announced that the country was to withdraw from the Commonwealth. On 20 November 2013, the British high commission formally became the British embassy and the British high commissioner became the British ambassador.

Fulfilling an election pledge of President Adama Barrow, The Gambia rejoined the Commonwealth on 8 February 2018 and the British ambassador became the British high commissioner again.

== List of heads of mission ==
=== High commissioners ===
- 1965–1967: George Edmond Crombie
- 1968–1971: Granville Ramage
- 1972–1975: James Roland Walter Parker
- 1975–1979: Martin Rogers
- 1979–1981: Eric Smith
- 1981–1984: David Francis Battye Le Breton
- 1984–1987: John Garner
- 1988–1990: Alec Ibbott
- 1991–1993: Alan Pover
- 1994–1995: Michael Hardie
- 1995–1998: John Wilde
- 1998–2000: Tony Millson
- 2000–2002: John Perrott
- 2002–2006: Eric Jenkinson
- 2006–2011: Philip Sinkinson
- 2011–2013: David Morley

=== Ambassadors ===
- 2013–2014: David Morley
- 2014–2017: Colin Crorkin
- 2017–2018: Sharon Wardle

=== High commissioners ===
- 2018–2020: Sharon Wardle
- 2020–2023: David Belgrove OBE
- 2023–present: Harriet King
