= George Edmond Crombie =

British diplomat (1908–1972)

George Edmond Crombie CMG
- Born: 14 June 1908; Scotland
- Died: 8 December 1972 (aged 64); Aberdeen
- Education: University of Aberdeen
- Occupation: Diplomat

George Edmond Crombie (14 June 1908 – 8 December 1972) was a British diplomat.

== Early life and education ==
Crombie was born on 14 June 1908 in Scotland, the son of Dr James M. P. Crombie of Aberdeen. He was educated at Fettes College and University of Aberdeen.

== Career ==
Crombie joined the India Office, London in 1931 as assistant Principal and rose to Principal in 1937. During World War II, he served in the 1st Frontier Force Regiment, Indian Army, as lieutenant (1942–1945), and while serving in Italy was mentioned in dispatches.

After the War, he rejoined the India Office and in 1947 was appointed assistant Secretary of the Burma Office. In 1948, he was sent out to Burma as Deputy High Commissioner, Rangoon, and after Burma's independence in 1948, served as Counsellor at the Embassy, Rangoon from 1948 to 1949. He was awarded the CMG in 1950.

From 1951 to 1953, he was Deputy High Commissioner in Madras. From 1955 to 1958, he was Counsellor at the High Commission in Ottawa. From 1959 to 1960, he served as Deputy High Commissioner in the Federation of Malaya. From 1961 to 1965, he was Counsellor at the British Embassy, Dublin. In 1965, he was appointed as the first British High Commissioner to Gambia upon the country's independence that year, and remained in the post until his retirement in 1967.

Crombie died on 8 December 1972 at Aberdeen, aged 64.

== Honours ==
Crombie was appointed Companion of the Order of St Michael and St George (CMG) in the 1950 New Year Honours.
