= Giles Bullard =

British diplomat (1926–1992)

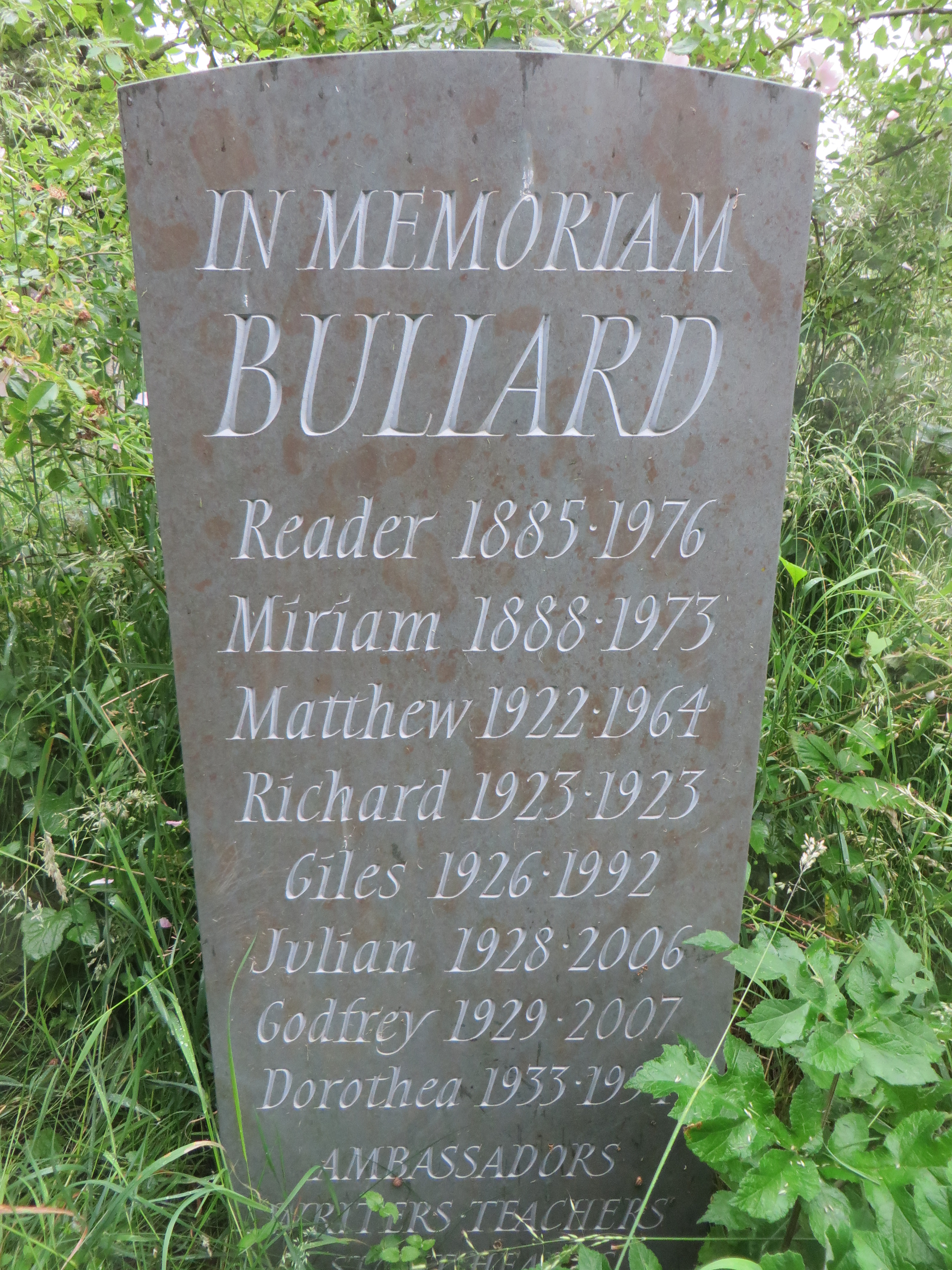
"In Memoriam Bullard" memorial stone in Holywell Cemetery, Oxford, England

Sir Giles Bullard KCVO CMG (24 August 1926 – 11 November 1992), was a British diplomat. His appointments included British Ambassador to Bulgaria and High Commissioner to the West Indies at the time of the American invasion of Grenada.

== Early life ==
Giles Lionel Bullard was born in Oxford, England, one of five children of Sir Reader Bullard and his wife, Miriam Catherine (Biddy), née Smith (one of his brothers being the diplomat Sir Julian Bullard).

Bullard was educated at the Dragon School, Oxford, and at Blundell's School in Tiverton in Devon. He won a scholarship to Balliol College in Oxford, which he attended from 1944 to 1945, before three years of national service, including a year with the West African Rifles.

In 1948 Bullard returned to Balliol, where he was president of the junior common room, and played cricket and rugby for the college, and rugby for the university in 1950 and 1951, in the latter year as captain of the side that beat Cambridge 13–0 in the Varsity Match, Bullard contributing most of the Oxford score. In 1952 he captained the Oxford University RFC team which made an unbeaten tour of Japan. He graduated with a second in modern history in 1951. On 20 December 1952 he married Hilary Chadwick (d. 1978), daughter of J. C. Brooks, of London; they had two sons and two daughters.

== Career ==
After three years with a shipping firm, mostly in Norway, Bullard joined the foreign service in 1955, serving in Bucharest, Panama, Bangkok, and Islamabad. He had two home postings, in the mid-1960s to the personnel department of the Foreign Office, and in the mid-1970s as a senior inspector.

Bullard spent a year at the Centre for South-East Asia Studies in Cambridge, and from 1977 to 1980 was consul-general in Boston, where he met his second wife, Linda Lewis, née Rannells (d. 1995), whom he married in 1982. His next post was as British Ambassador in Sofia.

Bullard's next posting was as High Commissioner to the West Indies, based in Bridgetown, Barbados. Only two months after his arrival came the American invasion of Grenada, to topple a left-wing regime and a suspected pro-Cuban plot. This armed intervention in a Commonwealth country was greeted in London with official outrage, but Bullard, who knew the strong feelings about the Grenada regime in other West Indian countries, advised co-operation with the Americans, or at any rate doing nothing to hamper them. The fact that his advice was ignored was something he never referred to, though he was sorely tempted to do so in the face of American criticism.

Bullard was appointed Companion of the Order of St Michael and St George (CMG) in the 1981 Birthday Honours and Knight Commander of the Royal Victorian Order in 1985.

After his retirement in 1986 Bullard lived at the Manor House, West Hendred, near Wantage, where he engaged in many country pursuits and local interests. Like his father, Bullard was quietly spoken, a rock of integrity, and a man of wide reading and subtle humour. He died at his home on 11 November 1992.

Diplomatic posts
Preceded by John Cloake	Ambassador Extraordinary and Plenipotentiary at Sofia; 1980–1983	Succeeded by John Snodgrass
Preceded by John Morrison	High Commissioner of the United Kingdom to Barbados; 1983–1986	Succeeded by Kevin Burns
