= Timeline of Oxford =

Coordinates: 51°45′N 1°15′W

The following is a timeline of the history of the city, university and colleges of Oxford, England.

== Pre-history ==
- Activity from the Mesolithic period onwards, attested by archaeological finds across the city.
- Bronze Age henge and barrow complexes at locations including the University Parks.
- Bronze Age burials at locations including The Hamel, Radcliffe Infirmary, Banbury Road, and several university buildings.
- Wide-ranging Iron Age and Roman remains, suggesting continued occupation from pre-conquest period into the Roman era.

== Recorded history before 12th century ==
- By 727 – Dida of Eynsham establishes a nunnery with Frideswide, perhaps his daughter, as abbess.
- after 871 – Coins of Alfred the Great are minted with the name of Oxford, as Orsnaforda.
- 911 – Mention of Oxford, as Oxnaforda, under the authority of Edward the Elder, King of Wessex.
- 979 – Vikings burn Oxford.
- 1002 – 13 November: St. Brice's Day massacre of Vikings: Monastery of St Frideswide destroyed.

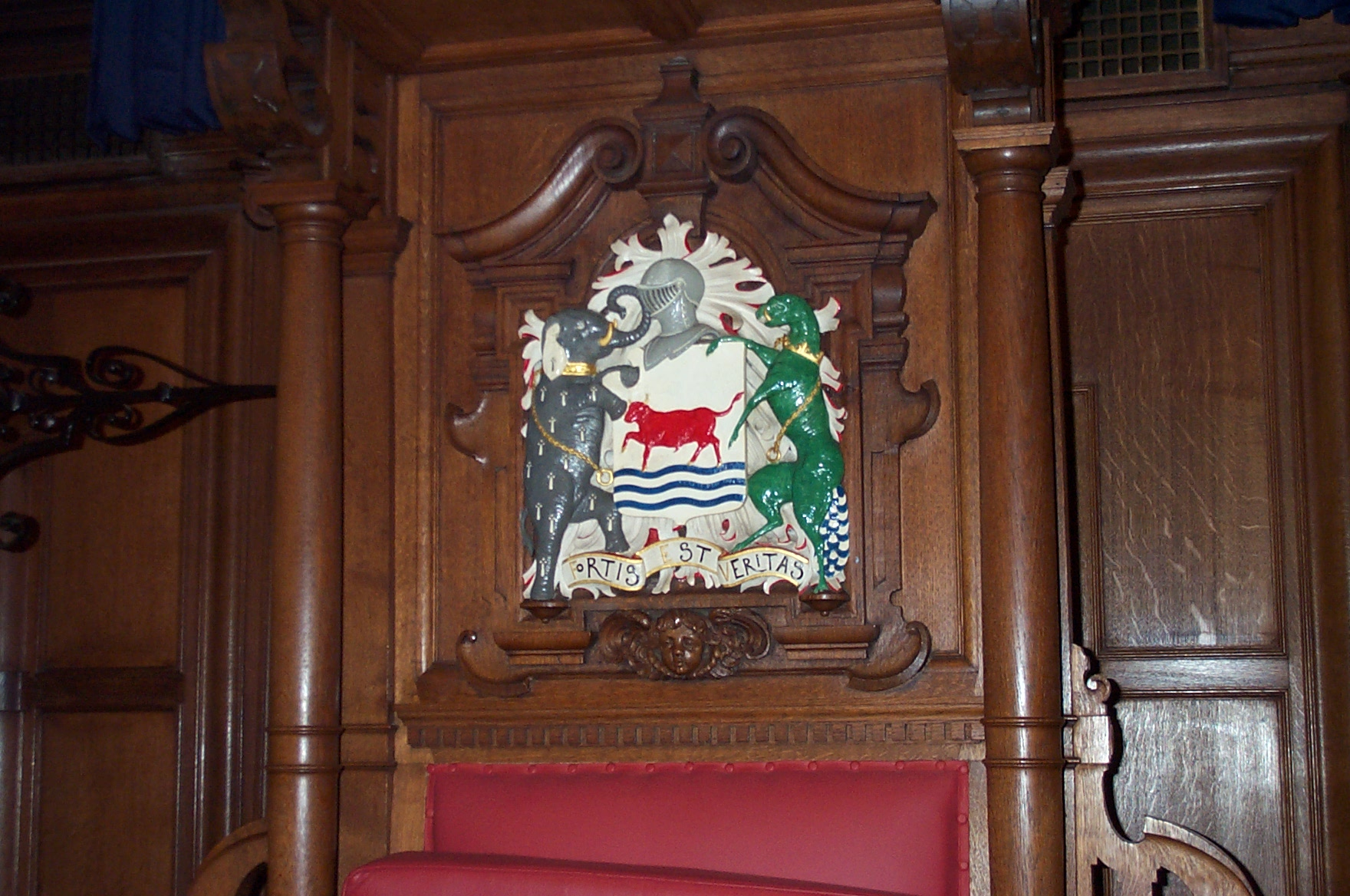
City coat of arms in Town Hall

- 1004 – First bridge over the River Cherwell east of the town centre (on the site of modern-day Magdalen Bridge) is in existence.
- 1009 – 1 August: Vikings burn Oxford.
- 1015 – Early: Sigeferth and Morcar, chief thegns of the Five Boroughs of the Danelaw, come to an assembly in Oxford where they are murdered by Eadric Streona.
- 1018 – Cnut the Great attends a Witenagemot at Oxford at which he is recognised as king of England.
- 1022 – Witenagemot held at Oxford to translate the laws of England into Latin and apply them equally within England and the Danelaw.
- 1026 – Witenagemot held at Oxford.
- 1036 – Council of Oxford (a Witenagemot) declares Harold Harefoot regent of England for his half-brother Harthacanute.

University seal

- c. 1040–50 – Tower of St Michael at the North Gate completed.
- 1071–73 – Oxford Castle erected as a motte-and-bailey by Norman baron Robert D'Oyly.
- 1074
  - St George's tower at the castle is built in stone (it may have Saxon origins), including a chapel for a college of secular canons.
  - First stone of St Mary Magdalen's Church, built by D'Oyly, is laid.
- c. 1085 – First stone bridge over the River Thames at Grandpont (modern-day Folly Bridge) is built by D'Oyly.
- 1088 – Curia regis held at Oxford by William II of England.
- 1096 – Academic teaching at Oxford is recorded.

== 12th century ==
- c. 1100 – Construction of St Lawrence, North Hinksey as a chapel begins.
- c. 1110 – Priory of St Nicholas, Littlemore, established.
- 1122
  - Priory of St Frideswide established.
  - Original All Saints Church established.
  - Approximate date: St Martin's Church, Carfax built.
- 1126 – Leper hospital and St Bartholomew's Chapel (Bartlemas), Cowley, established by Henry I.
- 1129 – Osney Abbey established as a priory by Robert D'Oyly the younger. It is raised to abbey status in 1154.
- c. 1130–60 – Nave, chancel and crypt of St Peter-in-the-East built.
- 1131 – Godstow nunnery established.
- 1133
  - Easter: King Henry I is in residence at his new Beaumont Palace.
  - Robert Pullen, an English theologian, teaches in Oxford.

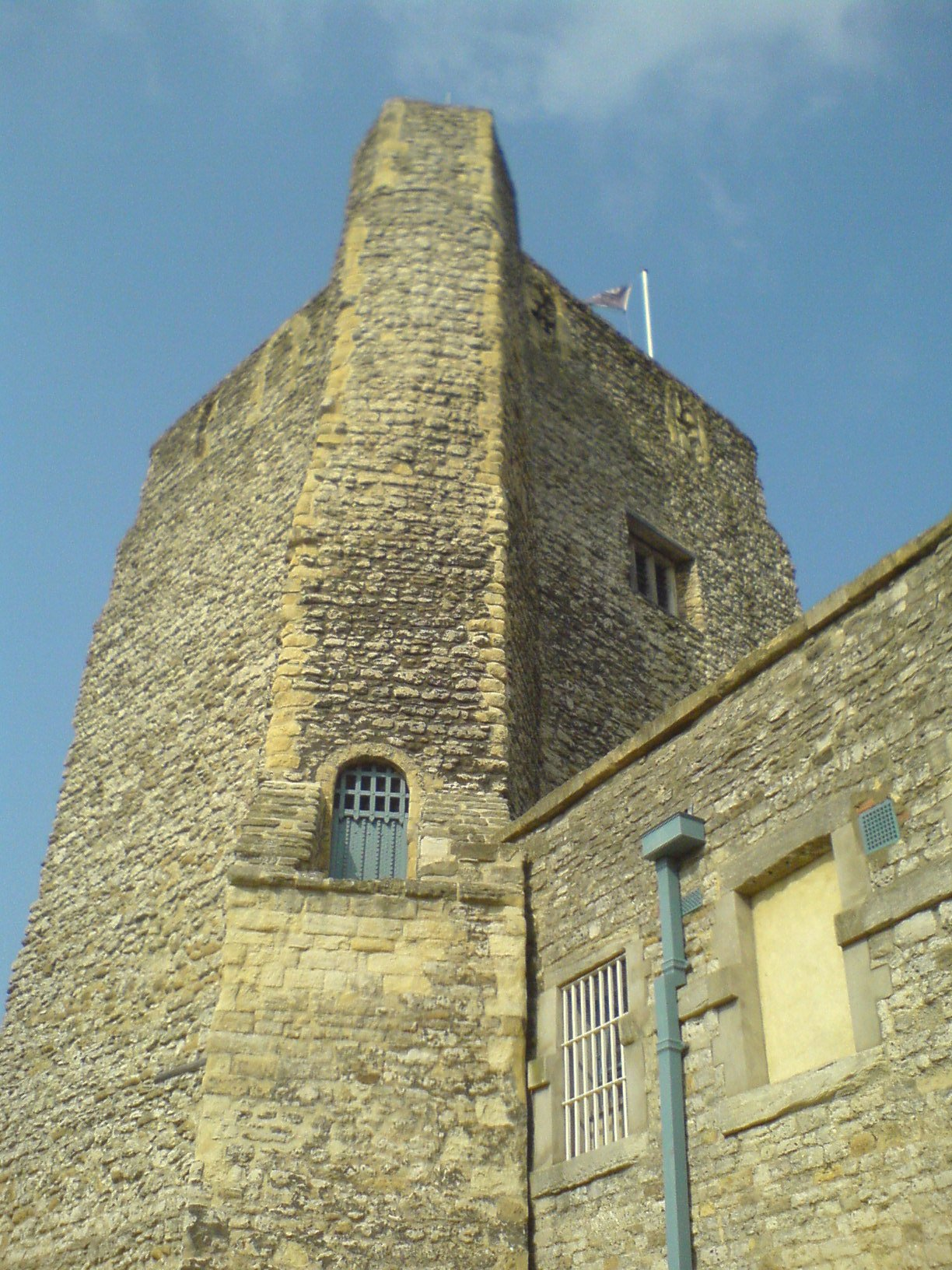
St George's Tower of the Castle

- 1136 – April: Curia regis held at Oxford by the new king Stephen, attended by Theobald of Bec.
- 1138 – Major fire.
- 1139
  - Curia regis held at Oxford.
  - Temple Cowley founded by Queen Matilda for the Knights Templar.
- 1141 – 24 June: The Anarchy: Empress Matilda is forced to flee from Westminster to Oxford.
- 1142 – The Anarchy
  - 26 September: King Stephen captures Oxford and besieges Matilda inside the castle.
  - December: Matilda escapes from Oxford Castle across the snow in a white cape for camouflage.

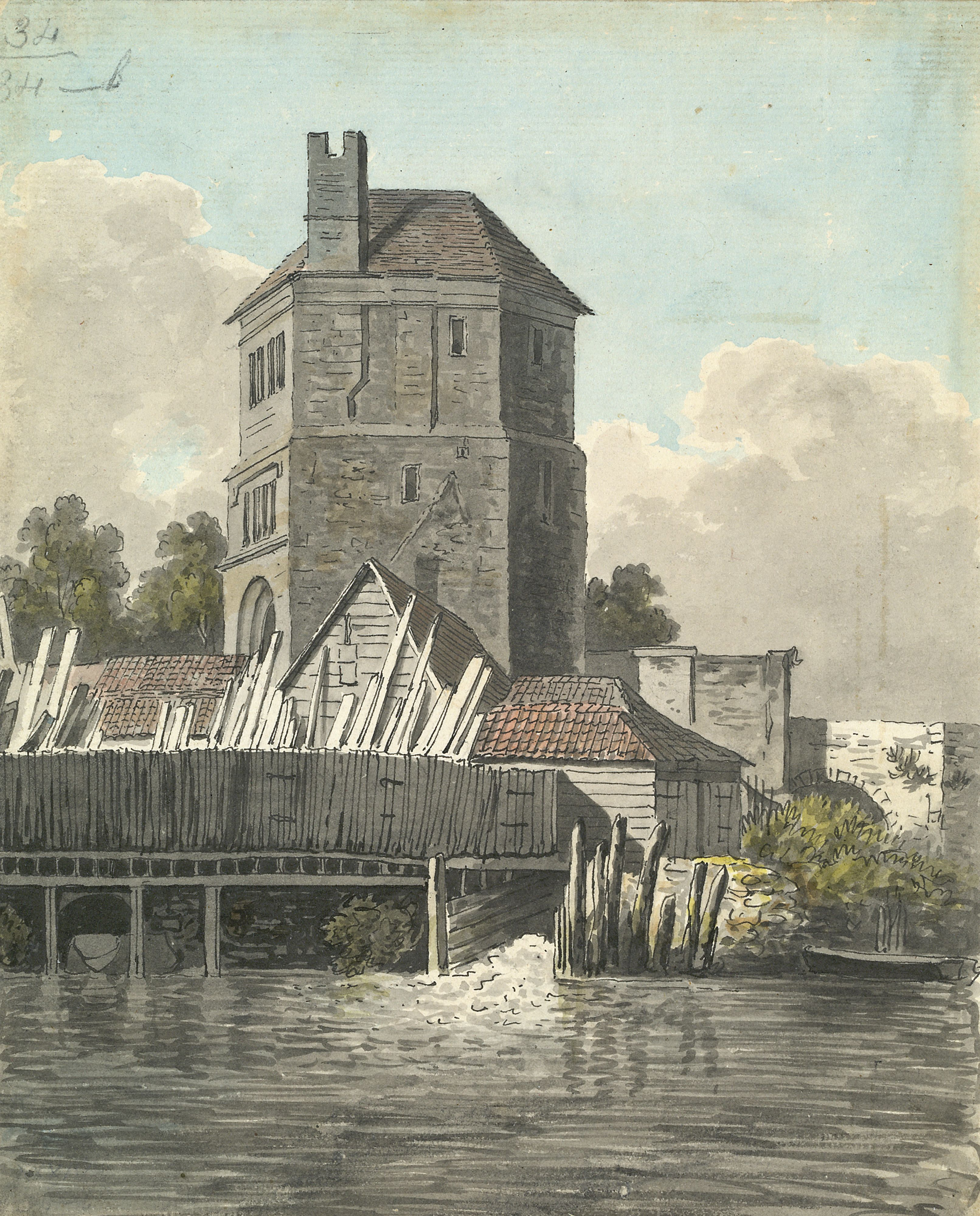
"Friar Bacon's Study" at Folly Bridge (demolished 1779)

- 1157 – 8 September: Richard I of England ("the Lionheart") born in Beaumont Palace.
- c.1160–1180 – St Mary the Virgin, Iffley built.
- 1166 – 24 December: John, King of England, born in Beaumont Palace.
- 1167 – Increased enrolment at Oxford after English students are barred from attending the University of Paris.
- 1177
  - May: Council of Oxford on governance of Ireland.
  - Jewish cemetery.
- 1185 – Curia regis held at Beaumont Palace by Henry II.
- c. 1187–1188 – Gerald of Wales reads his Topographia Hibernica to a large academic audience in Oxford.
- 1190
  - First known foreign scholar commences study at Oxford, Emo of Friesland.
  - Major fire.
- By 1191 – Burgesses are using the first known corporate town seal in England.
- 1193 – The inn later to become the Golden Cross is in existence.
- 1194 – St Mary Magdalen's Church rebuilt by Bishop Hugh of Lincoln.

== 13th century ==
- c. 1200–10 – First Hythe Bridge built.
- 1205
  - Council held at Oxford by King John who also spends Christmas here.
  - Approximate date: First known Mayor of Oxford.
- 1209 – Dissatisfied students from Oxford found the University of Cambridge.
- 1213 – 15 November: A council of knights is held in Oxford.
- 1214 – 20 June: Papal ordinance defines the rights of the scholars at the University of Oxford. By 1216 a chancellor of the university is in office.
- 1215 – 16–23 July: A council of the barons charged with enforcing Magna Carta meets with King John at Oxford Castle.
- 1216 – Oxford Castle's first recorded use as a prison, for misbehaving students.
- c. 1220 – Osney Abbey constructs a conduit for fresh water from North Hinksey.
- 1221 – 15 August: The Dominican Order founds Blackfriars.
- 1222 – 17 April: Stephen Langton, Archbishop of Canterbury, opens the Synod of Oxford at Osney Abbey, which introduces measures against Jews.
- 1224 – c. October: Franciscans led by Agnellus of Pisa found the first Greyfriars in Oxford. By c. 1229 Robert Grosseteste is teaching theology to the order here.
- By c. 1230 – Broad Street laid out beyond the city wall as Horsemonger Street.
- 1236 – Rioters cause a fire.
- Between c. 1236 and 1272 – St Edmund Hall, at this time known as the ‘house of Cowley’, established, "the oldest surviving academic society to house and educate undergraduates in any university."
- 1238 – Students attack the papal legate's retinue.
- 1239 – Oxford Castle's first recorded use as a county gaol.
- 1240
  - Robert Grosseteste, Bishop of Lincoln, establishes "St Frideswide's Chest" for the support of poor scholars.
  - Approximate date: William de Brailes is working on illuminated manuscripts in the city, including an early book of hours, perhaps for a woman called Suzanna from North Hinksey.
- 1242
  - For the murder of an Oxford scholar, townsman Henry Symeonis and others are fined and ordered to leave the town for some months by King Henry III.
  - A tavern exists on the site of the Bear Inn.
- 1249 – Spring: Bequest of William of Durham for the support of scholars, used for establishment of University College.
- By 1252 – University Congregation meeting in the University Church of St Mary the Virgin.
- 1253 – June: University buys property to support the establishment of University College, on the north side of The High.
- 1258
  - 12 June: Provisions of Oxford enacted by a parliament meeting at the Dominican Friary in St. Ebbes, creating an elected Council of barons to advise King Henry III (abandoned 1261).
  - 27 October–4 November: Oxford Parliament meets, with Peter de Montfort presiding.
- 1262 – Consecration of a priory church in Oxford, probably the largest of the Dominican Order in England, in St Ebbe's.
- 1263
  - Early May: Simon de Montfort, 6th Earl of Leicester, newly returned from exile, summons a meeting of rebel barons at Oxford, leading to the outbreak of the Second Barons' War. Soon afterwards, the King occupies the town and holds a council here.
  - Town and gown riots.
  - Presumed date: Balliol College is founded in the university by John I de Balliol on its modern-day site. Its first statutes are sealed on 22 August 1282 by his widow, Dervorguilla of Galloway, who in 1284 also conveys the freehold of its site.
- 1264
  - February: Student riots.
  - 12 March: Henry III suspends teaching in the university until Michaelmas as he is making the city his military headquarters at the outbreak of the Second Barons' War.
  - 14 September: Walter de Merton formally completes the foundation of the House of Scholars of Merton, later Merton College in the university.
- 1265 – Christmas: Henry III is entertained at Osney Abbey.
- 1268 – Ascension Day: Riots against Jews.
- 1274
  - January: Student riots between northerners and southerners.
  - August: Merton College receives its statutes, the first English university college to do so.
- 1276 – Merton College is first recorded as having a collection of books, making its library the world's oldest in continuous daily use. During the first century of its existence the books are probably kept in a chest.
- 1279 – Wolvercote Common villagers' rights first confirmed.
- 1280/1 – University College receives statutes.
- 1281 – December: Rewley Abbey, established in 1280 by Edmund, Earl of Cornwall for Cistercians, is dedicated.
- 1283 – Gloucester College is founded in the university for Benedictines of Gloucester Abbey.
- Between 1283 and 10 May 1301 – Hart Hall established in the university.
- c. 1291 – Durham College is founded in the university for Benedictines from Durham.
- 1292 – Guildhall.
- 1294 – Holywell passes to Merton College.
- 1295 – Earliest known members of parliament for Oxford.
- 1297 – Quaking Bridge first known.
- By 1300 – The philosopher Duns Scotus is studying in Oxford.

== 14th century ==
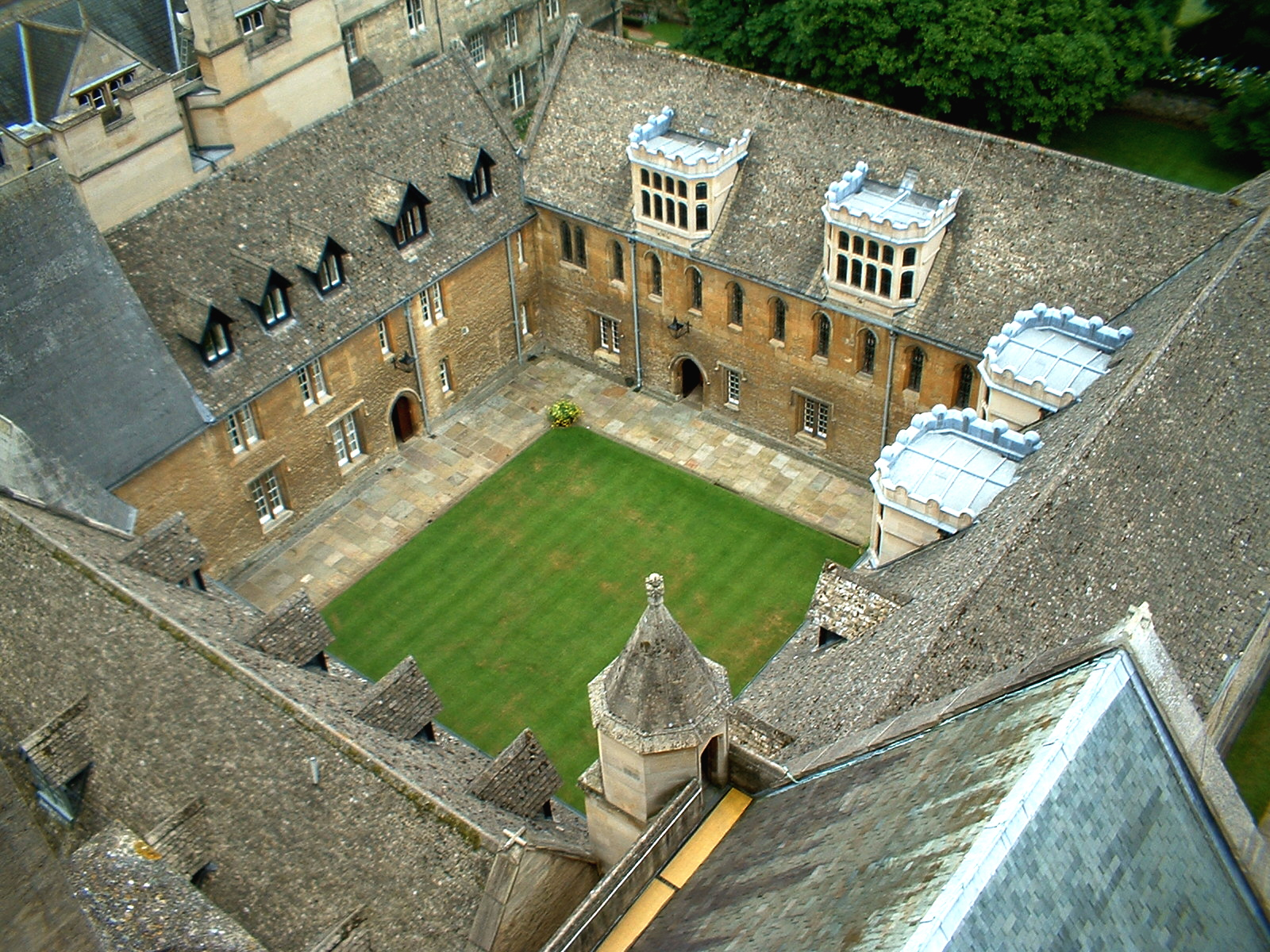
Merton College's Mob Quad

- 1310 – Mob Quad, the first purpose-built accommodation for students, completed in Merton College.
- 1314 – 4 April: Exeter College is founded in the university by Walter Stapledon, Bishop of Exeter, and his brother for education of clergy (statutes 26 April 1316).
- 1317 – St Edmund Hall first recorded under this name in the university.
- 1318 – John Deydras, pretender to the English throne, claims Beaumont Palace.

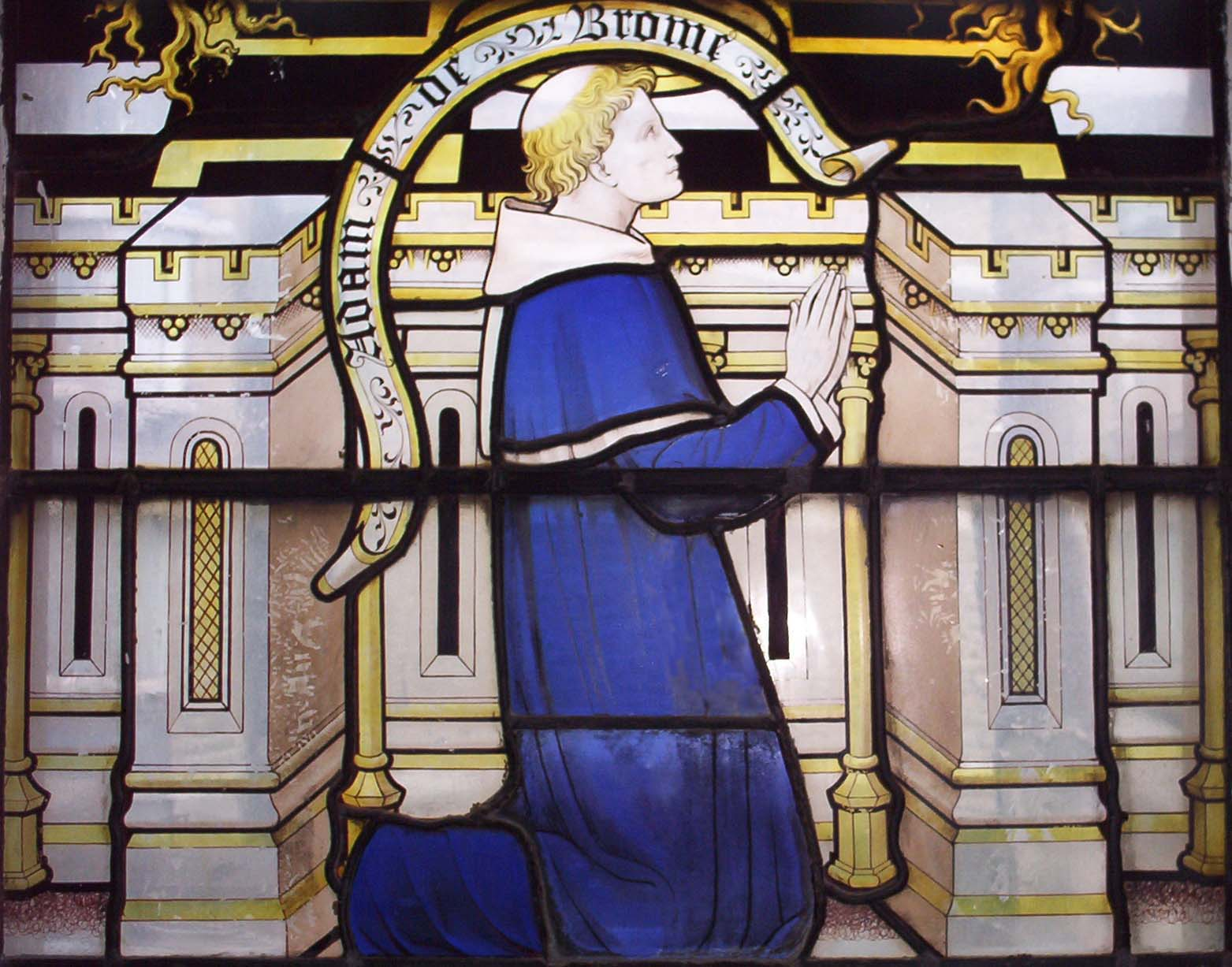
Adam de Brome, founder of Oriel College

- c. 1320
  - Original University Convocation House added to University Church of St Mary the Virgin.
  - Tackley's Inn built in the university.
- 1324
  - 24 April: Oriel College is founded in the university by Adam de Brome by licence from King Edward II in honour of the Virgin Mary.
  - Franciscan friar and philosopher William of Ockham is summoned from Oxford to the Papal court at Avignon; either at this time or later he comes into conflict with Pope John XXII and never returns to England.
- 1326
  - 21 January: Oriel College chartered.
  - 2 October: Invasion of England: Isabella of France reaches Oxford.
- 1327
  - 1 February: First record of the mayor of Oxford serving the monarch at a coronation feast.
  - 27 August: Death of Thomas Cobham, Bishop of Worcester. His books are given to the university, where they are installed in a room above Convocation House in the University Church of St Mary the Virgin, forming the university's first library.
- 1329 – Oriel College's fellows, previously accommodated in Tackley's Inn, move to La Oriole from which the college takes its name.
- 1332 – University College first acquires property on its modern-day site.
- 1333 – November: Following violence between northern and southern masters, a group of the former from Brasenose and Merton migrates to Stamford, Lincolnshire, and attempts to set up a university there. In August 1334, the chancellor of Oxford obtains a royal writ to suppress it, and it is closed in summer 1335.
- 1341 – 18 January: The Queen's College is founded as the "Hall of the Queen's scholars of Oxford" in the university in the name of Philippa of Hainault by her chaplain, Robert de Eglesfield.
- 1348 – November: Black Death reaches Oxford, continuing until June 1349.
- 1355 – 10 February: St Scholastica Day riot breaks out, leaving 63 scholars and perhaps 30 locals dead in two days.
- 1362 – Canterbury College is founded in the university by locally-born Simon Islip, Archbishop of Canterbury, for Benedictine monks of Christ Church Priory, Canterbury and secular priests of the province of Canterbury.
- c. 1370s – Cretan-born Franciscan Peter Phillarges, the future Antipope Alexander V, studies in the university.
- 1373
  - Merton College Library is built.
  - Rebuilding of Hythe Bridge in stone begins.
- 1379 – 30 June: New College is founded in the university by William of Wykeham, Bishop of Winchester, as "The College of St Mary of Winchester in Oxford" (charter 26 November).
- 1381 – Summer: John Wycliffe's doctrines are pronounced heresy by the university Chancellor and he leaves Oxford about October.
- 1386 – 14 April: First scholars enter New College, the first college in the university to provide extensively for undergraduate education and also the first with an entrance tower and with a T-plan college chapel.
- 1394 – Summer: John/Eleanor Rykener, a London transvestite male prostitute (and embroiderer) is active in Oxford, consorting with scholars, leaving a rare surviving legal record from this period which mentions same-sex intercourse.
- 1396 – Construction of bell tower at New College begins, the first recorded use of building stone from Headington Quarry.

== 15th century ==
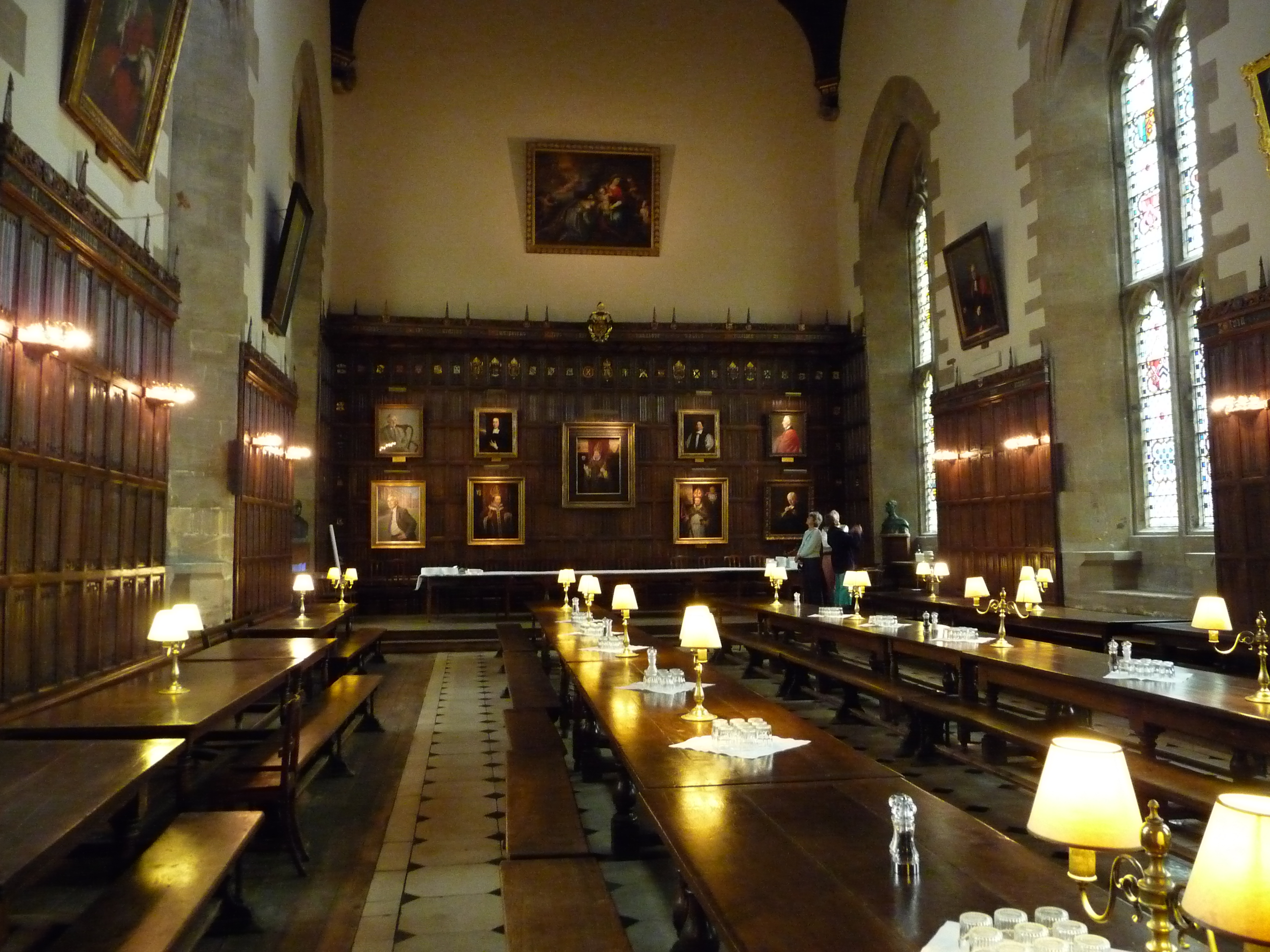
New College Dining Hall

- 1403 – Rebuilding of Hythe Bridge in stone completed.
- 1410 – University students forbidden to lodge with townspeople.
- 1427 – 13 October: Lincoln College is founded in the university by Richard Fleming, Bishop of Lincoln, for his secular clergy.
- 1435 – St Mary's College is founded in the university for Augustinians.
- 1437 – St Bernard's College is founded in the university for Cistercians.
- 1438 – 10 February: All Souls' College is founded in the university by Henry Chichele, Archbishop of Canterbury, and King Henry VI as a graduate institution.
- 1458 – 15 July: Magdalen College is founded in the university by William Waynflete, Bishop of Winchester and Lord Chancellor of England.
- 1461 – 3 July: The university chancellor is authorised to ban prostitutes within 10 miles of the city.
- 1465 – First mention of an Osney Bridge.
- By 1476 – New Inn Hall rebuilt and first known under this name.
- 1478
  - Severe outbreak of plague.
  - Lincoln College is re-endowed by Thomas Rotherham, Bishop of Lincoln.
  - Chapel and cloister of Magdalen College completed by architect William Orchard.
  - 17 December: First book printed in Oxford.
- 1480 – Magdalen College School established by William Waynflete. Waynflete also establishes a Grammar Hall at his college which by the early 16th century becomes known as Magdalen Hall.
- c.1480 – St George's College founded in the university, served by Augustinians of Osney Abbey.
- 1481 – 11 October: The printer Theoderic Rood from Cologne is known to be established in Oxford.
- 1485–1487 – Outbreaks of plague or epidemics in each of these years.
- 1486 – Magdalen College provides places for commoners (fee-paying students).
- 1488 – The university's Divinity School is completed with Duke Humfrey's Library on the upper floor as decreed in 1444 by the university to accommodate the manuscripts given by Humphrey, Duke of Gloucester (died 1447) and begun in 1478.
- 1490 – Construction begins on the tower of Magdalen College. John Colet receives his M.A. from the college.

== 16th century ==
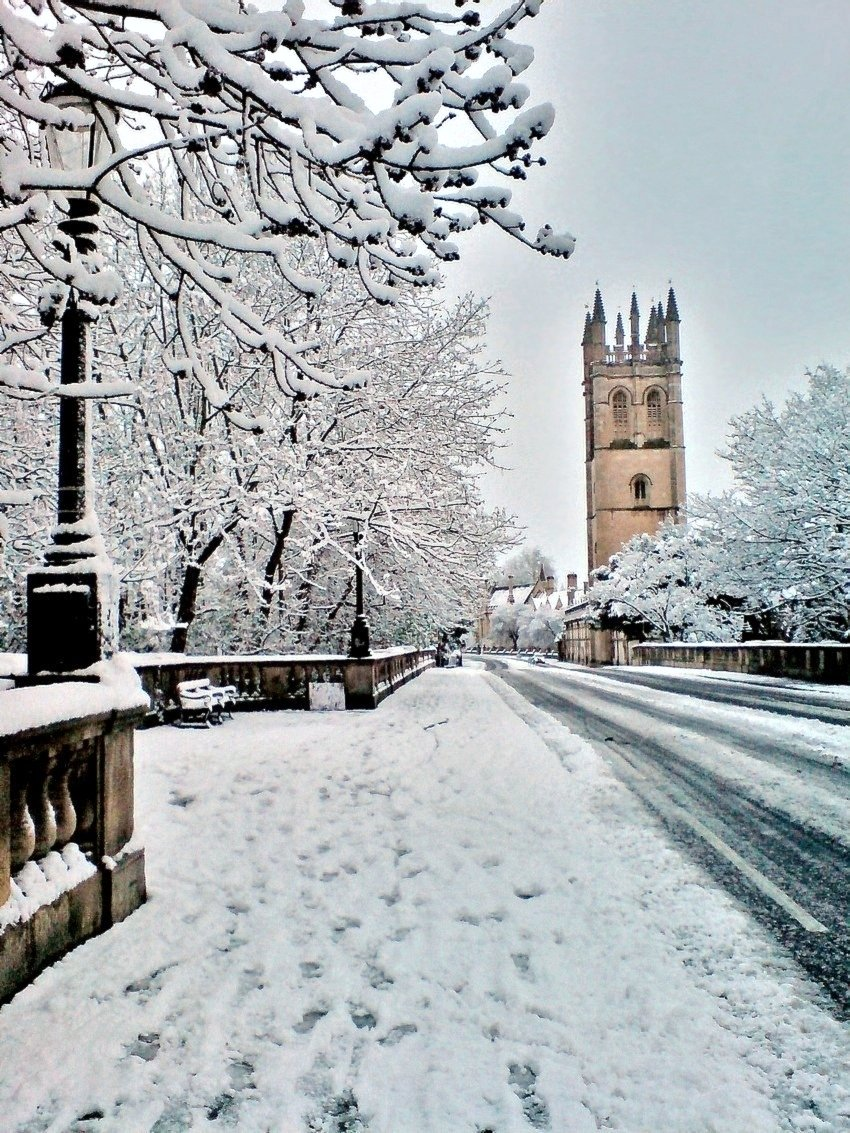
Magdalen Tower from Magdalen Bridge

- 1509
  - Magdalen Tower completed.
  - 19 June: Construction of Brasenose College as a hall in the university is begun by Sir Richard Sutton (lawyer) of Prestbury, Cheshire, and the Bishop of Lincoln, William Smyth, for secular clergy (charter 15 January 1512).
- 1510 – Visit of King Henry VIII.
- 1517
  - 1 March: Corpus Christi College founding charter is signed by Richard Foxe, Bishop of Winchester. On 12 March the college's first secular clergy begin their humanist studies within the university in the premises which have been under construction since 1512.
  - A third epidemic of sweating sickness hits Oxford and Cambridge.
- 1517–1518 – Littlemore Priory scandals.
- 1523 – Visit of King Henry VIII.
- 1525
  - February: Littlemore Priory suppressed.
  - July: Cardinal Wolsey founds Cardinal College in the university on the site of the Priory of St Frideswide (suppressed April 1524) and of Canterbury College. It will be the first college in which it is possible to study all subjects taught in the university. Work is suspended on Wolsey's downfall in 1529.
- 1530 – Gill's ironmongers opens; it remains in business in the city until 2010.
- 1531 – Oxford Castle's formally constituted use as a county gaol.
- 1532 – 18 July: Cardinal College, suppressed in 1531, is refounded as King Henry VIII's College, an ecclesiastical foundation.
- 1534 – 3 November–18 December: The Reformation Parliament passes the Act of Supremacy establishing Henry VIII as supreme head of the Church of England. All colleges and similar institutions are obliged to acknowledge this; the master and fellows of Balliol College do so only under protest.
- 1535 – First appointment to the chair of Regius Professor of Divinity founded by Henry VIII: Richard Smyth.
- 1536
  - Dissolution of the Monasteries and other religious institutions: Rewley Abbey dissolved.
  - First cornmarket erected in Northgate Street.
- 1538 – Dissolution of the Monasteries: Greyfriars dissolved.
- 1539 – Dissolution of the Monasteries: Gloucester College, Osney Abbey and Godstow nunnery (17 November) dissolved.
- 1540 – Dissolution of the Monasteries: St Bernard's College and St Mary's College dissolved.
- 1542 – Diocese of Oxford created. In September, Osney Abbey becomes the seat of the new Bishop of Oxford, the last abbot, Robert King, becoming the first bishop. This gives the town of Oxford city status. The see is transferred to King Henry VIII's College in June 1544.
- 1546
  - 4 November: Christ Church refounded as a college by Henry VIII under this name. Christ Church Cathedral School is also founded, for the education of boy choristers.
  - Regius Professorship of Hebrew founded by Henry VIII.

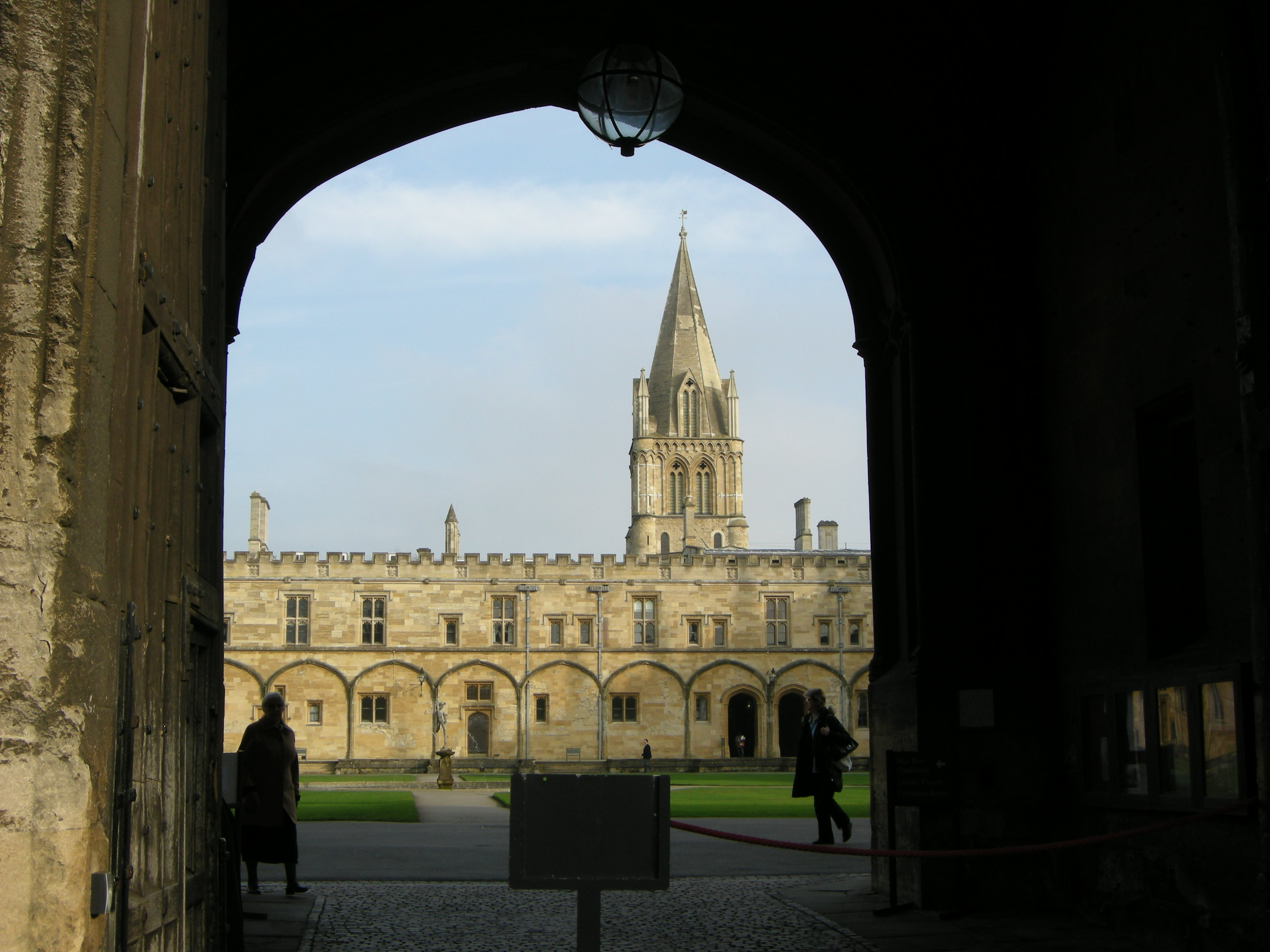
Christ Church

- 1548 – March: Florentine evangelical reformer Peter Martyr Vermigli is appointed Regius Professor of Divinity in place of Richard Smyth. He is forced to flee the city in September 1553.
- 1550 – The university's Duke Humfrey's Library is stripped of "superstitious books and images".
- 1555
  - 1 May: St John's College founded by merchant Sir Thomas White on the site of St Bernard's College to teach Catholic theology.
  - 30 May: Trinity College founded by court official and landowner Sir Thomas Pope on the site of Durham College to teach Catholic theology.
  - 16 October: Two of the Oxford Martyrs, Hugh Latimer and Nicholas Ridley, are taken from the Bocardo Prison and burned at the stake in Broad Street following trial in the University Church of St Mary the Virgin. Cranmer perhaps watches from a bastion of the city wall.
- 1556 – 21 March: The third of the Oxford martyrs, Thomas Cranmer, deposed Archbishop of Canterbury, is burned at the stake for treason having professed his faith at St Mary's.
- 1562
  - 5 October: University of Douai inaugurated with Richard Smyth (theologian) from Oxford as chancellor. With its English College, it becomes a refuge for Catholic academics forced to leave Oxford.
  - Grazing rites of freemen of Oxford to Port Meadow and of residents of Wolvercote to Wolvercote Common are confirmed.
- 1566 – 31 August–6 September: Visit of Queen Elizabeth, staying at Christ Church. On 2 September at a performance of Richard Edwardes' play Palamon and Arcite before her the stage collapses causing three deaths, but the show goes on and "the Queen laughed heartily thereat". On 6 September the first honorary degrees to be awarded at a ceremony in Oxford are conferred on Edward de Vere, 17th Earl of Oxford, and eleven others, who receive the MA. The Queen grants a royal crest to the city coat of arms.
- 1571 – 27 June: Establishment of Jesus College "within the City and University of Oxford of Queen Elizabeth's foundation" on the site of White Hall by Welsh cleric and lawyer Hugh Price, the first college established as an Anglican institution at its foundation. It incorporates the Great White Hall.
- 1577 – 6 July: "Black Assize" results in an outbreak of epidemic typhus killing around 300 in the city. Rowland Jenkins, an Oxford stationer, is condemned to have his ears cut off for distributing Popish books.
- 1580 – 6 April: Dover Straits earthquake felt in Oxford.
- 1581
  - Undergraduates are required to subscribe to the Thirty-Nine Articles of the Anglican Church.
  - 27 June: Copies of Edmund Campion's Decem Rationes, arguments against the validity of the Anglican Church, printed clandestinely at Stonor Park, are found on the benches of the University Church of St Mary the Virgin.
- 1582 – February: Meleager, a Latin play on the mythological figure of Meleager by "Gulielmus Gagerus" (William Gager), is performed by members of Christ Church.
- 1583 – 11 June: Rivales, another Latin play by Gager, is acted by members of Christ Church; it is criticised for its "filth". The following day they present another, Dido.
- 1585 – 3 April: The Queen's College is incorporated as a full college under this name by an act of Parliament, the Queen's College, Oxford Act 1584 (27 Eliz. 1. c. 2 Pr.), obtained by its Provost, Henry Robinson.
- 1586 – Oxford University Press is recognised by decree of the Star Chamber.
- 1588
  - Balliol College is granted a royal charter.
  - First published map of the city, surveyed by Ralph Agas in 1578.
- 1589
  - 5 July: Catholic priests George Nichols and Richard Yaxley, together with two helpers, are hanged in Holywell, having been arrested for celebrating mass at the Catherine Wheel inn in Magdalen Street East.
  - 8 December: Oxford-born John Underhill, Rector of Lincoln College, is elected Bishop of Oxford, the see having been vacant for 21 years. He holds the post until his death on 12 May 1592 after which the see again falls vacant for 11 years.
- 1592 – 22–28 September: Visit of Queen Elizabeth, staying at Christ Church. On 26 September members of Christ Church revive William Gager's 1583 Latin play Rivales before her.
- c. 1594 – Mound erected as a feature in New College garden.
- 1598 – 23 February: Thomas Bodley refounds the university's Duke Humfrey's Library.

== 17th century ==
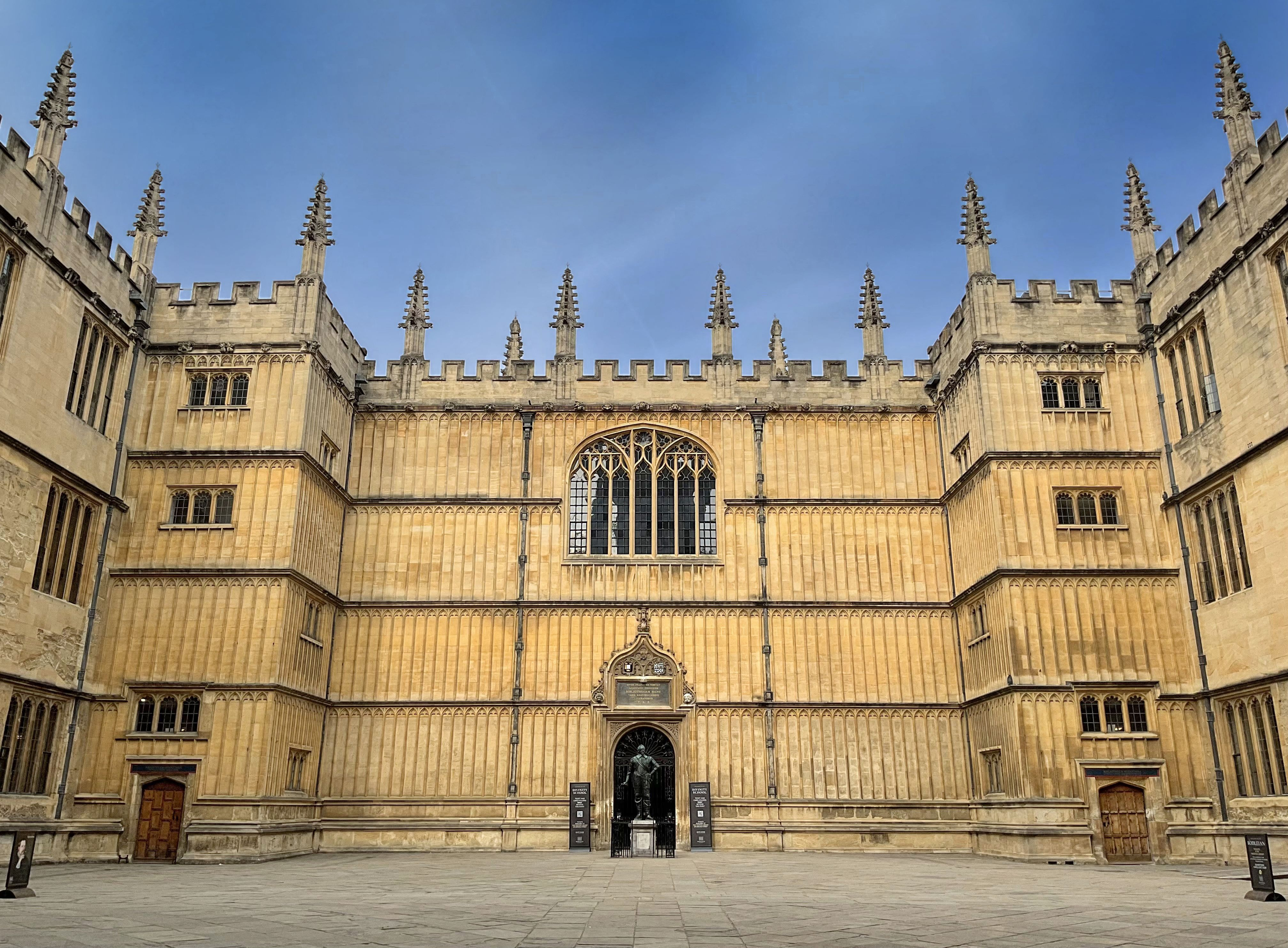
Bodleian Library

- 1602 – 8 November: Bodleian Library opens; Thomas James is its first librarian and publishes the first catalogue in 1605.
- 1603 – Antiquary William Camden publishes an edition of early British histories in which he inserts into Asser's Life of King Alfred a spurious claim that Alfred the Great founded the University of Oxford in 886.
- 1604
  - 31 January: Sir Thomas Crompton becomes the first burgess summoned to sit as a member for the newly created Oxford University constituency in the Parliament of England.
  - John Bridges is elected Bishop of Oxford, the seat having been vacant for 11 years.
  - The King's Men (playing company) make their first visit to Oxford; they will come a total of 6 times by 1613.
- 1604–1611 – Men of the university participate in the translation of the King James Version of the Holy Bible, with the First Oxford Company under John Harding (President of Magdalen) working on the Old Testament Prophets and the Second Oxford Company under Thomas Ravis on the New Testament Gospels.
- 1605
  - c. March: Catholic conspirators in the Gunpowder Plot meet at the Catherine Wheel inn in Magdalen Street East.
  - 27–30 August: Visit of King James I, Queen Anne, and their son Prince Henry to the university. Gentlemen from St John's and Christ Church entertain them with a series of plays, including (at the latter) an early example of perspective scenery. The big hit of the visit is Samuel Daniel's The Queen's Arcadia; Matthew Gwinne's Latin play Vertumnus puts James to sleep.
- 1607 – 18 September: The King's Arms exists under this name.
- c. 1609? – Morus nigra (black mulberry) planted at Balliol College; it will still be flowering into the 21st century.
- 1610
  - 9 November: Catholic priest George Napper is hanged at the Castle for celebrating mass.
  - 12 December: Sir Thomas Bodley makes an agreement with the Stationers' Company of London to put a copy of every book registered with them into the new Bodleian Library, the origin of legal deposit in the British Isles. To accommodate this, he plans and finances an extension to the library, "Arts End" of Duke Humfrey's Library (completed 1612).
  - 20 December: Wadham College is founded in the university by Dorothy Wadham on the site of the college of Trinitarian Friars.
- 1612 – Jacob Barnet, a Jew, is imprisoned by the university for changing his mind about converting to Christianity; he is later exiled.
- 1616 – Robert Burton is appointed vicar of St Thomas the Martyr's Church, an office which he holds until his death in 1640.
- 1617 – Carfax Conduit completed.
- 1619 – Henry Savile founds the Savilian Professorships in Astronomy and in Geometry in the university.
- 1621 – The University of Oxford Botanic Garden, the oldest botanical garden in the British Isles, is founded as a physic garden by Henry Danvers, 1st Earl of Danby.
- 1624
  - February: The Bodleian Library takes delivery under its legal deposit privilege of a copy of the Shakespeare First Folio which it has bound by William Wildgoose. Having been sold, probably in 1664 when replaced by a new edition, it has to be bought back in 1906 by an appeal.
  - 5 August: Pembroke College is founded in the university on the site of Broadgates Hall, originally to support scholars from Abingdon School.
  - Bodleian Library's Old Schools Quadrangle completed and fitted out.
- 1625 – c. August: Court and Parliament temporarily move to Oxford because of bubonic plague in London.
- 1630 – The Mitre Hotel (in The High) in business.
- 1631 – Original Iffley Lock built as a pound lock on the Thames by the Oxford-Burcot Commission.
- 1634
  - 13 May: Construction of new university Convocation House begins.
  - Reconstruction of University College begins.
- 1635
  - October: Canterbury Quadrangle at St John's College, the first example of Italian Renaissance architecture in Oxford (begun 26 July 1631), is completed at the expense of William Laud, Archbishop of Canterbury.
  - New charter issued to the city.
- 1636
  - 3 March: A "great charter" to the university establishes Oxford University Press as the second of the privileged presses.
  - Late August: Visit of King Charles and Queen Henrietta Maria.
  - Royal charter permits the University Reader in Anatomy to claim the body of anyone executed within 21 miles of Oxford for dissection.
- 1637 – New University Convocation House completed; a new west end for the Bodleian Library on the upper floor is completed in 1640 and used from 1659 to house the oriental manuscripts and other material bequeathed by John Selden in 1654.
- 1642 – 29 October: King Charles I enters Oxford and establishes his court at Christ Church. Physician William Harvey is among them.
- 1643
  - 3 January: The royal mint is transferred from Shrewsbury to New Inn Hall.
  - January: Royalist newspaper Mercurius Aulicus begins weekly publication in Oxford.
  - April–June: Fortlet erected in St Clement's to cover Magdalen Bridge.
  - July: Charles I's Queen Henrietta Maria arrives in Oxford to take up residence at Merton College until April 1644.
  - 7 December: Royalist commander Sir Thomas Byron is fatally attacked outside his lodgings by one of his own soldiers, Captain Hurst, in a dispute over pay.
  - Parliamentary prisoners are held in city churches and in St George's Tower of Oxford Castle; and munitions are stored in the towers of University Church of St Mary the Virgin and New College.
- 1644
  - 22 January: Charles I opens the Royalist 'Oxford Parliament' at Christ Church.
  - 28 May–4 June: First Siege of Oxford by Parliamentarian troops in the English Civil War, ending with the departure of Charles I and his son. The original cornmarket is dismantled for the lead in its roof.
  - 6 October: Major fire, resulting from a soldier attempting to roast a stolen pig.
- 1645
  - March: Prince Rupert leaves Oxford for Bristol.
  - 19 May–4 June: Second Siege of Oxford by Parliamentarian troops. Their commander, Thomas Fairfax, is then ordered to march north.
  - 5 November: Charles I returns to Oxford to overwinter with his troops.
  - 30 December: Charles I requests the loan of Agrippa d'Aubigné's Histoire universelle from the Bodleian Library which, in accordance with its rules, is refused.
  - An English yew is planted in the Botanic Garden which will still be flowering in the 21st century.
- 1646
  - 27 April: Charles I flees Oxford in disguise and begins his journey from Oxford to the Scottish army camp near Newark.
  - 2–17 May: Third Siege of Oxford by Parliamentarian troops. On 5 May Martin Llewellyn's drama The King Found at Southwell becomes the last stage piece performed in the city before its surrender.
  - 20 June: Surrender of the Royalist garrison at Oxford to General Thomas Fairfax's Parliamentary New Model Army signed at Christ Church. On 22 June Princes Rupert and Maurice leave the city and on 24 June the main force marches out, ending the First English Civil War.
- 1647 – Cucking stool set up by Castle Mill.
- 1649–1660 – The semi-formal Oxford Philosophical Club of natural philosophers meets; it is a predecessor of the Royal Society of London.
- 1649 – 18 September: Two Leveller private soldiers are shot near Gloucester Green for their part in a second mutiny of the New Model Army's Oxford garrison.
- 1650
  - The Eagle and Child pub (in St Giles') in business.
  - 14 December – Domestic servant Anne Greene is hanged at Oxford Castle for infanticide, having concealed an illegitimate stillbirth. The following day she revives in a dissection room in the High and, being pardoned, lives until 1659.
- 1651
  - January: Oliver Cromwell appointed University Chancellor.
  - First coffee house in England is opened near the junction of Queen's Lane and The High by Jacob, a Lebanese Jew. (Oxford's next two coffee houses are opened in the same vicinity in 1654 by Cirques Jobson and 1655 by Arthur Tillyard.)
- 1654
  - City corporation buys its first fire engine.
  - First Quaker preachers in Oxford.
- By 1656 – Baptist meeting established.
- 1659
  - Robert Boyle with the assistance of Robert Hooke, having constructed an improved "Pneumatical Engine" or air pump at his residence in Oxford (where Boyle lives from 1655 to 1668), begins a series of experiments on the properties of air.
  - Old Dining Hall at St Edmund Hall built, the only new collegiate building erected in Oxford during the Interregnum.
- 1665
  - 25 September–January 1666: The royal court is in residence in Oxford to avoid the Plague in London, King Charles II living at Christ Church.
  - 9 October: The Cavalier Parliament assembles in Christ Church to avoid the Plague in London.
  - 7 November: The London Gazette, the oldest surviving journal, begins publication as The Oxford Gazette.

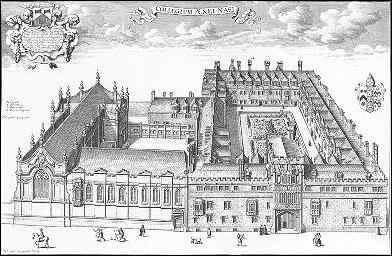
Brasenose in c.1674, from Loggan's Oxonia Illustrata

- 1666 – Chapel of Brasenose College consecrated; the adjacent library is also completed about this time.
- 1667 – Henry Howard donates the first of the Arundel marbles to the university; they will initially be displayed in a 'Garden of Antiquities' surrounding the Sheldonian Theatre.
- 1669 – 9 July: Sheldonian Theatre, designed by Christopher Wren in 1664 for university ceremonial and to accommodate the University Press, opens.
- 1674 – Oxford Almanack first published by Oxford University Press for the university.
- 1676 – New College bridge over Queen's Lane built.
- 1677
  - Elias Ashmole gifts the collection that begins the Ashmolean Museum to the university. It includes a stuffed dodo from the Musaeum Tradescantianum in London.
  - Holywell incorporated into the city.
- 1681
  - 21–28 March: Oxford Parliament meets in Convocation House (with the Lords at Christ Church) to debate the Exclusion Crisis before Charles II suspends it for the remainder of his reign. This is the last time Parliament meets outside London.
  - 25 March: Old Tom public house in St Aldate's opens as the Unicorn & Jacob's Well.
  - 31 August: Protestant activist Stephen College, convicted of treason, is hanged, drawn and quartered in Oxford.
- 1681–1682 – Tom Tower at Christ Church built to a design by Christopher Wren.
- 1683 – 24 May: The Ashmolean Museum opens in Broad Street as the world's first purpose-built university museum, including accommodation for the teaching of natural philosophy and a chemistry laboratory. Naturalist Dr. Robert Plot is the first keeper and first professor of chemistry.
- 1685 – Obadiah Walker, Master of University College since 1676, openly establishes a Catholic cell there.
- 1687 – 4 September: King James II tries to expel the Fellows of Magdalen College for refusing to Catholicise their institution and on 25 October forcibly installs Samuel Parker (bishop of Oxford) as college president. Anti-Catholic riots ensue.
- 1688
  - 18 August: Timothy Hall is nominated as Bishop of Oxford following the death of Samuel Parker. Although consecrated on 7 October at Lambeth, he is refused installation by the canons of Christ Church.
  - November: Princess Anne, having fled the royal court of her father James II in the company of Sarah Churchill, arrives in Oxford where she rejoins her husband Prince George of Denmark and they declare for the Glorious Revolution.
- 1693 – 29 July: Anthony Wood is condemned in the vice-chancellor's court of the university for certain libels against Edward Hyde, 1st Earl of Clarendon; he is fined, banished from the university until he recants, and the offending pages are burned outside the Sheldonian Theatre.
- 1694 – 12 April: Dedication of the chapel at Trinity College, designed by Henry Aldrich with advice from Christopher Wren, the first Baroque college chapel.
- 1697 – 23 November: Apothecary John Crosse makes a will establishing the Oxford Hospital on his property at Little Park near Ampthill in Bedfordshire as an almshouse primarily for Oxford college servants; it is built c.1700.
- 1699 – February: Greek College is founded in the university for study of the Greek Orthodox Church, but lasts only until 1705.

== 18th century ==
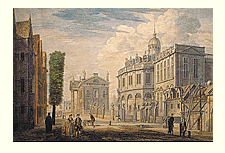
Broad Street looking east towards (right to left) the Old Ashmolean Building, the Sheldonian Theatre and the Clarendon Building

- 1700 – 8 March: Spire of All Saints Church in The High collapses. The body of the church is rebuilt 1706–1708.
- 1705 – Edmond Halley, Professor of Geometry, installed in his observatory in New College Lane, identifies the orbit of the comet which will be named after him.
- 1706–1711 – Peckwater Quadrangle at Christ Church is built on the site of Vine Hall and Peckwater's Inn.
- 1707–1760 – Major rebuilding of The Queen's College.
- 1708 – 14 July: Joseph Trapp becomes first Oxford Professor of Poetry.
- 1711–1715 – Clarendon Building, designed by Nicholas Hawksmoor, built for Oxford University Press.
- 1712 – 20 July: Jesus College inherits the extensive library of its Principal Jonathan Edwards on his death.
- 1714
  - 29 July: Worcester College, is founded in the university under the will of Sir Thomas Cookes of Worcestershire (died 1701) on the site of Gloucester Hall.
  - 1 December: Funeral of Dr John Radcliffe in Oxford.
- 1715 – 28–29 May: Riots in support of Jacobitism, partly directed against Dissenters.
- 1716 – Construction begins of
  - All Souls' College's North Quad and Codrington Library, designed by Nicholas Hawksmoor (21 June).
  - University College's Radcliffe Quadrangle, to the design of its older buildings.
- 1718 – 16 November: The Alfred Jewel, a work of Anglo-Saxon art, is given to the Ashmolean Museum.
- 1720 – Spire of All Saints Church in The High rebuilt.
- 1721 – 1 November: Death of Nathaniel Crew, 3rd Baron Crew and Bishop of Durham, activates his bequests of 24 June 1720 setting up the annual Creweian Oration and Feast in the university.
- c.1721 – First New Road Baptist chapel built.
- 1722 – Turl Street gate in city wall demolished.
- 1725 – "George the First's Experiment": A Professor of Modern History, appointed under royal patent, appoints the university's first scholars of modern languages; the experiment does not persist.
- 1728 – 17 November: William Smith completes writing The Annals of University College, written to refute the legend of the college's foundation by Alfred the Great, in favour of William of Durham.
- 1729 – Charles Wesley and his brother John set up the Holy Club, origin of Methodism, with 14 fellow students, including George Whitefield.
- 1733
  - 5–12 July: George Frideric Handel performs a series of concerts in Oxford including on 10 July the première of his oratorio Athalia in the Sheldonian Theatre, where he plays the 1725 Harris organ.
  - New Buildings at Magdalen College begun.
  - First greenhouses in the Botanic Garden constructed.
- 1734 – Johann Jacob Dillenius is appointed first Sherardian Professor of Botany.
- 1737 – 17 May: Radcliffe Library construction begins.
- 1738 – Boswells of Oxford department store begins business as a luggage manufacturer and retailer. It closes in March–April 2020 and reopens as a hotel in May 2024.
- 1740 – 8 September: Hart Hall refounded by charter as the first Hertford College in the university.
- 1741 – Dial clock installed in tower of University Church of St Mary the Virgin by Thomas Paris of Warwick.
- 1748
  - February–April: Student riots in support of Jacobitism.
  - Holywell Music Room, the first purpose-built concert hall in Europe, is opened.
- 1749 – 12 April: The circular Radcliffe Library, designed by James Gibbs, is opened under the bequest of Dr John Radcliffe (died 1714) in the newly laid out Radcliffe Square.

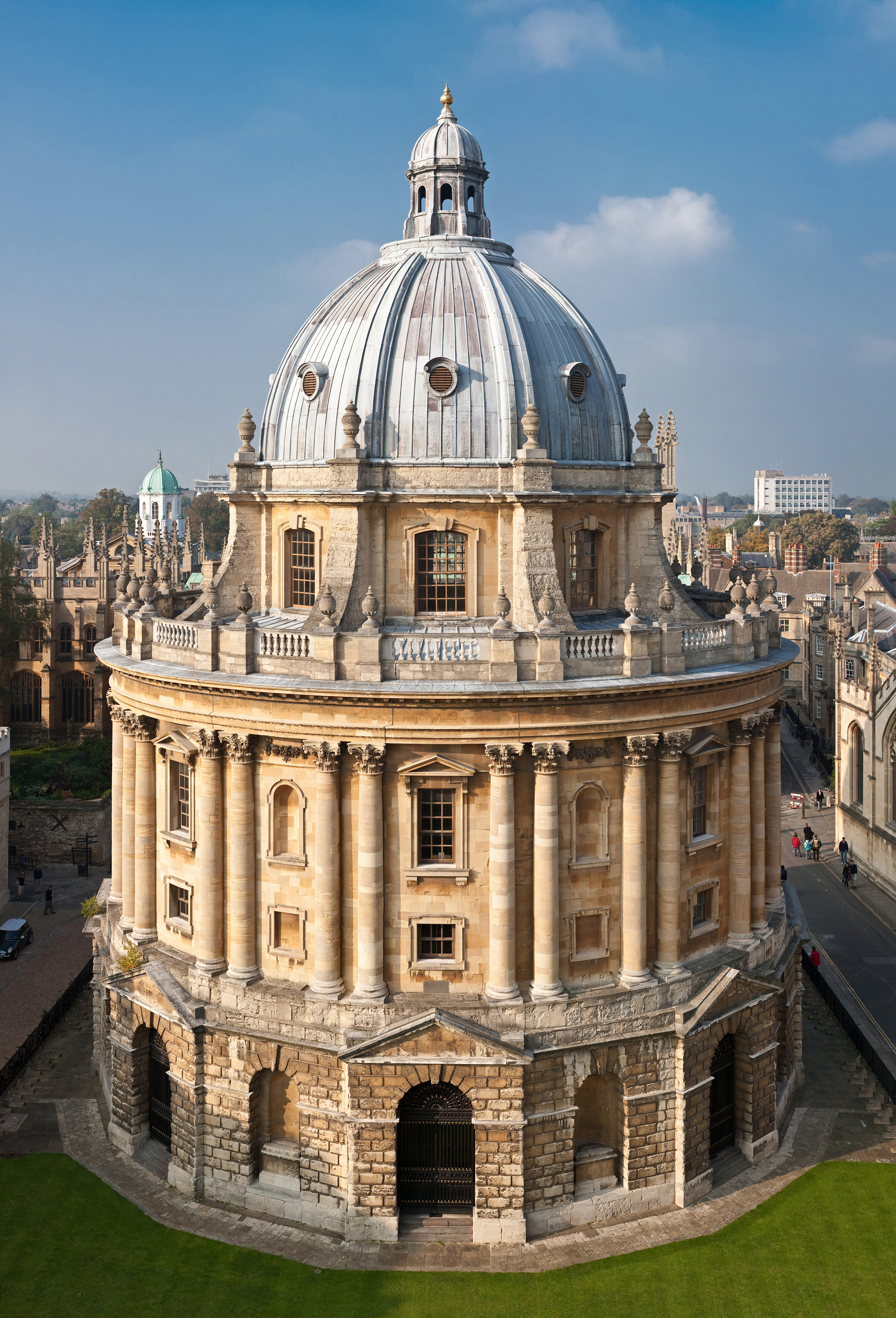
Radcliffe Camera

- 1751
  - Guildhall replaced by Town Hall, including a cornmarket.
  - Codrington Library at All Souls is completed.
- 1752 – 6 April: Mary Blandy is hanged at Oxford Castle for patricide, the last woman hanged in Oxford.
- 1753 – 5 May: Jackson's Oxford Journal begins publication.
- 1755 – January: The Ashmolean Museum's decayed stuffed dodo is largely destroyed.
- 1764 – 6 November: Earthquake of ~3.4 $M_L$.
- 1765 – 12 June: The death of General John Guise activates his 1760 bequest of a large collection of Old Master paintings to his alma mater, Christ Church, where they are assembled in 1767 as the foundation of Christ Church Picture Gallery.
- 1769
  - Oxford standard text of the King James Bible, edited by Benjamin Blayney, first published.
  - Alfred Masonic lodge first meets.
- 1770
  - 18 October: Radcliffe Infirmary admits its first patients.
  - New Road completed.
- 1771 – 28 March: The Oxford Improvement Act 1771 (11 Geo. 3. c. 19) – also known as the Mileways Act – provides for major improvements to the city streets. East Gate, North Gate and Bocardo Prison demolished and paving and lighting commissioners appointed.
- 1772
  - February: Floods cause partial collapse of Magdalen Bridge over the Cherwell.
  - The first city workhouse is opened on the site that will later become Wellington Square.
- 1773–1783 – Canterbury Quadrangle at Christ Church is built to the design of James Wyatt at the expense of Richard Robinson, 1st Baron Rokeby and Archbishop of Armagh.
- 1773 – Summer: Radcliffe Observatory instruments delivered. Construction of the buildings, begun at the end of June 1772, is not completed (to the design of James Wyatt) until c.1797.
- 1774 – 1 November: Covered Market opened.
- 1776 – February: Precious metal objects are stolen from the old Ashmolean Museum by a Frenchman known as Le Maitre, subsequently arrested and imprisoned; the theory that he was Jean-Paul Marat lacks verification.
- 1778 – Magdalen Bridge, rebuilt by John Gwynn of Shrewsbury, reopens to traffic.
- 1779 – 7 April: "Friar Bacon's study" at Folly Bridge sold for demolition.
- 1780 – Possible foundation date of the Bullingdon Club, originally as an exclusive undergraduate sporting club.
- 1782 – Morrells take a partnership in the Lion Brewery (founded in 1743 by Richard Tawney).
- 1783
  - April: 7-year-old Jane Austen begins a brief spell being tutored by Mrs Ann Cawley in Oxford.
  - 4 July: John Wesley preaches for the first time in the Methodist meeting house in New Inn Hall Street.
- 1784 – 4 October: James Sadler makes the first hot air balloon flight in England, from Oxford to Woodeaton.
- 1787 – Original Carfax Conduit replaced; moved in 1789 to Nuneham House.
- 1790
  - 1 January: The Oxford Canal is opened throughout from Coventry to a new basin in Oxford.
  - End: Osney Lock and cut on the Thames, built by convict labour, is opened.
  - Major expansion of the prison begins.
- 1791 – 8 July: Joseph Haydn is awarded an honorary doctorate of music as the culmination of a 3-day visit. He probably conducts his Symphony No. 92 in the Sheldonian Theatre (where he plays the Harris organ) as part of the ceremonials.
- 1794 – Under threat of the French Revolutionary Wars, a meeting at the Star Inn leads to formation of the County Fencible Cavalry, predecessor of the Oxfordshire Yeomanry and Queen's Own Oxfordshire Hussars.
- 1795 – St Ignatius church built in St Clement's, the city's first new Roman Catholic church since the Reformation.

== 19th century ==
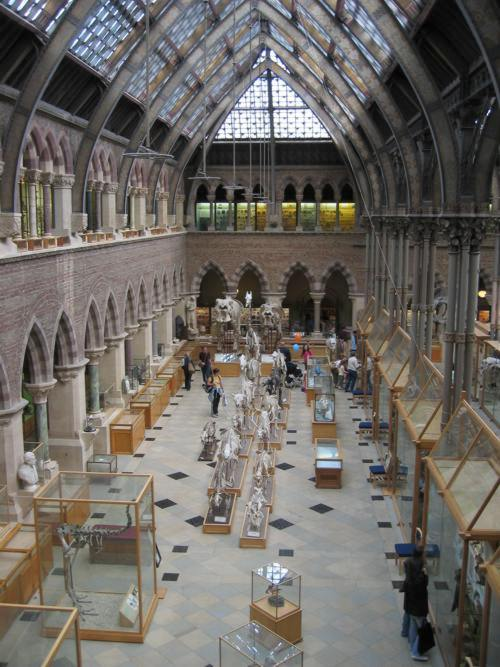
University Museum

- 1800 – New University examination statute establishes rigorous written examinations in mathematics and Literae Humaniores.
- 1806 – Sir Roger Newdigate founds the university's Newdigate Prize for English Poetry. The first winner is John Wilson ("Christopher North").
- 1810 – 29 March: Oxford, Ohio, is laid out in the United States as the home for Miami University.
- 1811 – 25 March: The university expels the first-year undergraduate Percy Bysshe Shelley after he and Thomas Jefferson Hogg refuse to answer questions about The Necessity of Atheism, a pamphlet they published anonymously. This follows earlier subversive works printed in the city: Shelley and Hogg's pseudonymous burlesque Posthumous Fragments of Margaret Nicholson of the previous November and Shelley's Poetical Essay on the Existing State of Things "By A Gentleman of the University of Oxford" from January.
- 1812 – William Carter opens the ironmongers that becomes Eagle Ironworks.
- 1813 – 14 November: A continuous series of meteorological records for Oxford is begun at the Radcliffe Observatory.
- 1814 – 14 June: Allied sovereigns' visit to England: Banquet in Radcliffe Library for The Prince Regent, Tsar Alexander of Russia and King Frederick William III of Prussia, who on the following day are awarded honorary degrees of the university.
- 1815
  - May: First Eights Week.
  - Daniel Evans establishes the building contractor which will become known by the name of his son-in-law, Symm. Their first contract is for construction of a new Wesleyan Methodist chapel in New Inn Hall Street. The business goes into liquidation in February 2020.
- 1816 – 4 May: The first Hertford College is declared to have been dissolved on 28 June 1805.
- 1818 – 23 May: Oxford Gaslight and Coke Company established by the Oxford Gas Act 1818 (58 Geo. 3. c. lxiv), with riverside works in St. Ebbes. Public gas street lighting begins in 1819.
- 1819 – 10 February: Apollo University Lodge consecrated.
- 1820
  - 9 January: Much of Magdalen Hall is destroyed by fire; soon afterwards part of the old Hertford College collapses and on 3 May the foundation stone of a new Magdalen Hall is laid on the Hertford site (completed 1822).
  - November: Residential development of Summertown begins; first house completed 24 March 1821.
  - Five Mile Walk established.
- 1823
  - June: Publication of John Gibson Lockhart's anonymous Reginald Dalton, establishes the "Oxford novel" genre.
  - Oxford Union established by students as the Oxford United Debating Society.
- 1825–c. June 1827 – New Folly Bridge built.
- 1825–1830 – New Oxford University Press building in Walton Street built.
- 1826 – July: Warneford Hospital opened as Oxford Lunatic Asylum.
- 1827
  - February: A University oath requiring those seeking to become MAs to swear never to be reconciled with Henry Symeonis is abolished, presumably because its purpose has long been forgotten.
  - 4 June: The University Match (cricket) is first played between Oxford University Cricket Club and Cambridge at Lord's; a draw.
  - October: Swimming bath opened in St Clement's by this date.
- 1828–1837 – Beaumont Street laid out.
- 1828
  - 14 March: J. H. Newman, Fellow of Oriel, succeeds Edward Hawkins as Anglican vicar of the newly refitted University Church of St Mary the Virgin, including pastoral care of Littlemore.
  - c. Summer: New St Clement's Church completed on a new site; as former curate, J. H. Newman had collected most of the funds.
- 1829
  - 10 June: The Boat Race 1829 – The newly established Oxford University Boat Club wins the first inter-university Boat Race, rowed at Henley-on-Thames; the crew wear dark blue.
  - Oxford University Police established.
- 1831 – 6 February: Henry Bulteel preaches a Calvinistic sermon critical of the university at the University Church of St Mary the Virgin. On 10 August, the Bishop of Oxford withdraws his licence to preach in Anglican churches. His supporters – Bulteelers – build the St. Ebbes chapel in Commercial Road for him.
- 1832 – 24 June–28 November: Cholera outbreak.
- 1833 – 14 July: John Keble preaches an Assize sermon on "National Apostasy" at the University Church of St Mary the Virgin, launching the Oxford Movement within the Church of England.
- 1834 – Arthur Wellesley, 1st Duke of Wellington, is appointed Chancellor of the University of Oxford, which office he holds until his death in 1852.
- 1835
  - c. April: The Elliston & Cavell partnership is formed as a drapers' stores.
  - 9 September: Municipal Corporations Act 1835 makes the city a municipal borough with effect from 1 January 1836, removing the jurisdiction of the university over tradespeople.
  - 19–20 October: Queen Adelaide makes an official visit to Oxford. Her escort, the 1st Oxfordshire Yeomanry Cavalry, is granted the style of Queen's Own Regiment of Oxfordshire Yeomanry Cavalry on 7 November.
  - Quaking Bridge rebuilt in iron.
  - Iffley Wesleyan Methodist Church on Rose Hill is founded; as Rose Hill Methodist Church it will still be in use into the 21st century as the city's oldest surviving Methodist church building.
  - Thornton's Bookshop opened.
- 1836
  - 1 January?: St Clement's brought within city boundary.
  - 8 February: Commencement of Hampden Controversy: Prime Minister Lord Melbourne's appointment of Renn Dickson Hampden (a supporter of toleration for Dissenters) as Regius Professor of Divinity in the university splits the Church of England into high church and liberal factions.
  - 22 September: Anglican Church of St Mary and St Nicholas, Littlemore, founded by J. H. Newman, is consecrated.
  - First New Theatre in George Street opens, the city's first purpose-built theatre.
- 1837
  - 26 March: J. H. Newman introduces the weekly celebration of communion at the University Church of St Mary the Virgin.
  - Redesign of the newly renamed Botanic Garden by Charles Daubeny, Sherardian Professor of Botany.
- 1839
  - July: First ever Royal Show (agricultural show) held in Oxford.
  - September: John Brande Morris, deputising for J. H. Newman at the University Church of St Mary the Virgin, preaches controversial sermons on fasting and transubstantiation.
  - Oxfordshire Architectural and Historical Society founded as the Society for Promoting the Study of Gothic Architecture.

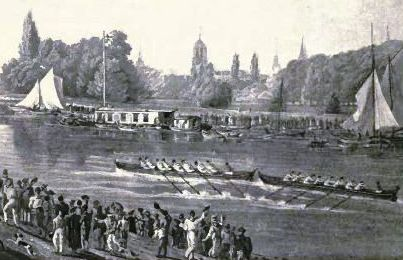
On the river – an early view

- 1841
  - 6 June (Sunday): Marian Hughes becomes the first woman to take religious vows in communion with the Anglican Province of Canterbury since the Reformation, making them privately to E. B. Pusey in Oxford. In 1849 she founds the Convent of the Society of the Holy and Undivided Trinity.
  - 8 June: Coldest day on record in Oxford, -9.6 °C.
  - June: Visit of Queen Victoria.
  - Oxfordshire County Hall built.
- 1842
  - February: J. H. Newman withdraws to Littlemore and establishes a semi-monastic community (leased 29 September 1841), "the house of the Blessed Virgin Mary at Littlemore". He preaches his last Anglican sermon on 22 September 1843 and takes his last Anglican communion 2 weeks later.
  - 1 July: Copyright Act 1842 (5 & 6 Vict. c. 45) confirms the Bodleian as a legal deposit library.
  - 29 July: Henry Fox Talbot takes the earliest known photographs of Oxford.
- 1843
  - April: Protestant Martyrs' Memorial completed.
  - 14 May: E. B. Pusey preaches a sermon on "The Holy Eucharist, a Comfort to the Penitent" before the university at Christ Church Cathedral which causes him to be suspended from preaching university sermons for two years but sells 18,000 copies.
- By 1844 – Jewish community served by a rabbi.
- 1844 – 12 June: Great Western Railway opens its branch from Didcot to a terminus in Grandpont. Residential development of New Hinksey follows.
- 1845
  - April–August: The university opens the Taylor Institution for the study of European languages (established under the will of Robert Taylor (architect), died 1788) and the adjacent new Ashmolean Museum building as the University Galleries.
  - 9 October: J. H. Newman is received into the Roman Catholic church at his college at Littlemore by Dominic Barberi. On 23 February 1846 he spends his last night in Oxford until 1878 at the Radcliffe Observatory.
- 1846
  - County Pauper Lunatic Asylum established at Littlemore.
  - St Ebbe's bathing place opened, the city's first rate-supported public river bathing place.
- 1847–1849 – Holywell, Osney and St Sepulchre's cemeteries open.
- 1847
  - 9 August: William Ewart Gladstone (possessor of an Oxford double first degree and at this time a Peelite Conservative) is elected as a member of parliament for the Oxford University constituency, which seat he will hold until July 1865.
  - Community of St Thomas the Martyr, the second High Anglican sisterhood in England, established by Thomas Chamberlain, vicar of St Thomas the Martyr's Church.
- 1849
  - August–October: Cholera outbreak.
  - c. September–October: Painter John Everett Millais visits Oxford and meets the university printer Thomas Combe, who becomes a patron of the Pre-Raphaelites.
  - William Sewell, Dean of Exeter College and novelist, burns a copy of J. A. Froude's novel of religious doubt The Nemesis of Faith.
- 1850
  - June–November: Millais again visits and works in the city.
  - 18 August: First railway excursion to Oxford, from London.
  - 27 September: Folly Bridge freed of tolls.
  - November: Undergraduates at Exeter College arrange a "foot grind" (a cross-country steeplechase) at Binsey, the first organised university athletic event in Britain.
  - The university establishes an Honour School (i.e. an undergraduate course) in Natural Science and a combined School in Law and Modern History, first examined in 1853.
- 1851
  - 20 May: The London and North Western Railway begins services to Rewley Road station.
  - Osney Town laid out.
- 1852
  - 1 October: Great Western Railway opens a new through Oxford railway station on its modern-day site.
  - December: Severe flooding.
- 1853–1855 – Park Town built, the first significant planned residential development in North Oxford; the architect/developer is Samuel Lipscomb Seckham.
- 1853
  - Enclosure of Cowley Field encourages residential development in the south-east.
  - Matthew Arnold's poem The Scholar Gypsy is written.
  - 'Cuthbert Bede, M.A.' (Edward Bradley)'s novel The Adventures of Mr. Verdant Green begins publication.
  - The Tumbling Bay swimming area opens.
- 1854
  - Whit Sunday: Thomas Chamberlain, vicar of St Thomas the Martyr's Church, controversially wears a chasuble for celebration of the Eucharist.
  - 1 June: Free public library opened.
  - August: The Oxford University Act 1854 (17 & 18 Vict. c. 81) reforms the university, opening it to undergraduates outside the Church of England by abolishing the requirement to undergo a religious test or take the Oath of Supremacy.
  - September: Cholera outbreak combined with smallpox.
  - Corporation waterworks established at South Hinksey.
- 1855 – University statute allows M.A.s aged over 28 to open private halls.
- 1856
  - 15 March: The Boat Race 1856, first of the annual series rowed between Cambridge and Oxford University Boat Clubs on the Championship Course of the River Thames in London; Cambridge wins.
  - St John's College begins residential development of its Walton Manor estate in North Oxford.
  - "A" Wing of Oxford Prison completed on the separate system.
- c.1857–Spring 1858 – Dante Gabriel Rossetti and Pre-Raphaelite friends paint the Oxford Union murals.
- 1858 – Salter Bros. set up as boatbuilders and hirers at Folly Bridge.
- 1859
  - 18 October: New chapel at Exeter College, designed by George Gilbert Scott, is consecrated.
  - First Chichele Professorships established.
  - 1st Volunteer Oxford University Rifles formed.

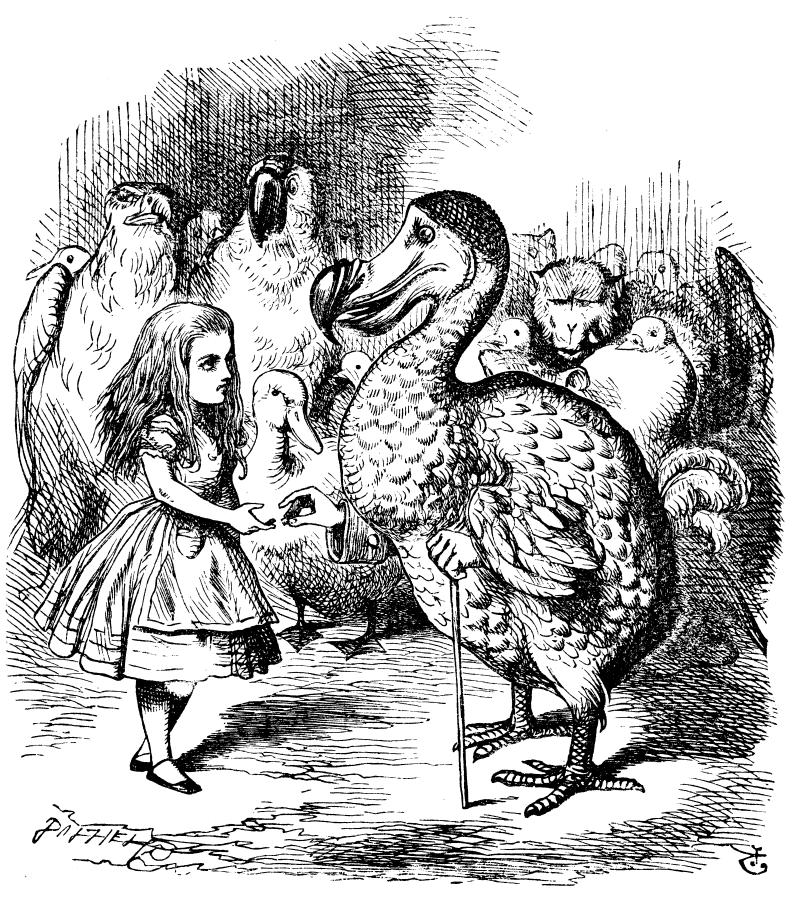
The Dodo (Alice's Adventures in Wonderland)

- 1860
  - 30 June: Evolution debate at the new University Museum.
  - 24 December: Coldest night on record in Oxford, -17.8 °C.
  - St John's College begins residential development of its Norham Manor estate in North Oxford.
- 1861
  - August: The Radcliffe Library's science books are moved to the new museum and on 25 October the older building is taken over by the university's Bodleian Library (by agreement of 12 June 1860) to become the Radcliffe Camera.
  - Hythe Bridge rebuilt in iron.
- 1862
  - 27 January: Radcliffe Camera reopens as an undergraduate reading room of the Bodleian Library.
  - 4 July: Charles Dodgson ('Lewis Carroll') takes Alice Liddell and her sisters on a rowing trip on The Isis from Folly Bridge to Godstow on which he tells the story that becomes Alice's Adventures in Wonderland (published 3 years later, with the first copies printed in Oxford).
  - Michaelmas: William Spooner becomes the first non-Wykehamist to enter New College, where he will remain for more than 60 years, serving as warden from 1903 to 1924.
  - The Oxford Times founded.
- 1863
  - 24 March: Last public hanging at Oxford Castle.
  - April: St Edward's School admits its first pupils, initially at Mackworth Hall in New Inn Hall Street.
- 1864 – Summer Fields School opened as a boys' preparatory school.
- 1865
  - Local board of health established.
  - New city workhouse opened on the Cowley Road.
  - Laying out of University Parks completed.
  - Oxford School of Art, the ancestor of Oxford Brookes University, begins to function located in the Taylor Institution.
  - December: Matthew Arnold's poem Thyrsis, with its reference to the "dreaming spires" of Oxford, is written.
- 1866
  - 15 February: Randolph Hotel opened.
  - The Society of St. John the Evangelist ("Cowley Fathers") is founded by Richard Meux Benson at Cowley, the first stable Anglican religious order for men in England since the Reformation.
  - The Meadow Building at Christ Church is completed.
- 1867
  - 12 August: Christ Church, Oxford Act 1867 (30 & 31 Vict. c. 76) modernises administration of Christ Church and its cathedral.
  - November–December: Town and gown and bread riots.
- 1868
  - 11 June: University Delegacy of Non-Collegiate Students founded to offer university education without the costs of college membership.
  - Convent of the Society of the Holy and Undivided Trinity occupies its new premises in Woodstock Road.
  - Walter Eddison and Richard Noddings from Yorkshire form the partnership that by 1874 becomes the Oxfordshire Steam Ploughing Company, based at Cowley.
  - Oxford Police Act 1868 (31 & 32 Vict. c. lix) establishes a unified city police force with effect from 1 January 1869. On 4 February 1869 newly appointed police constable Joseph Gilkes drowns while fleeing a mob.
- 1869
  - August: John Ruskin appointed first Slade Professor of Fine Art in the university; he delivers his first visiting lecture on 8 February 1870 in the Sheldonian, announcing his intention to establish what becomes the Ruskin School of Drawing.
  - 27 August: Oxford University Boat Club wins the first international boat race held on the Thames against Harvard University.
  - 19 October: St Barnabas Church, Jericho, designed by Arthur Blomfield for Thomas Combe, consecrated.
  - Oxford University Rugby Football Club founded.

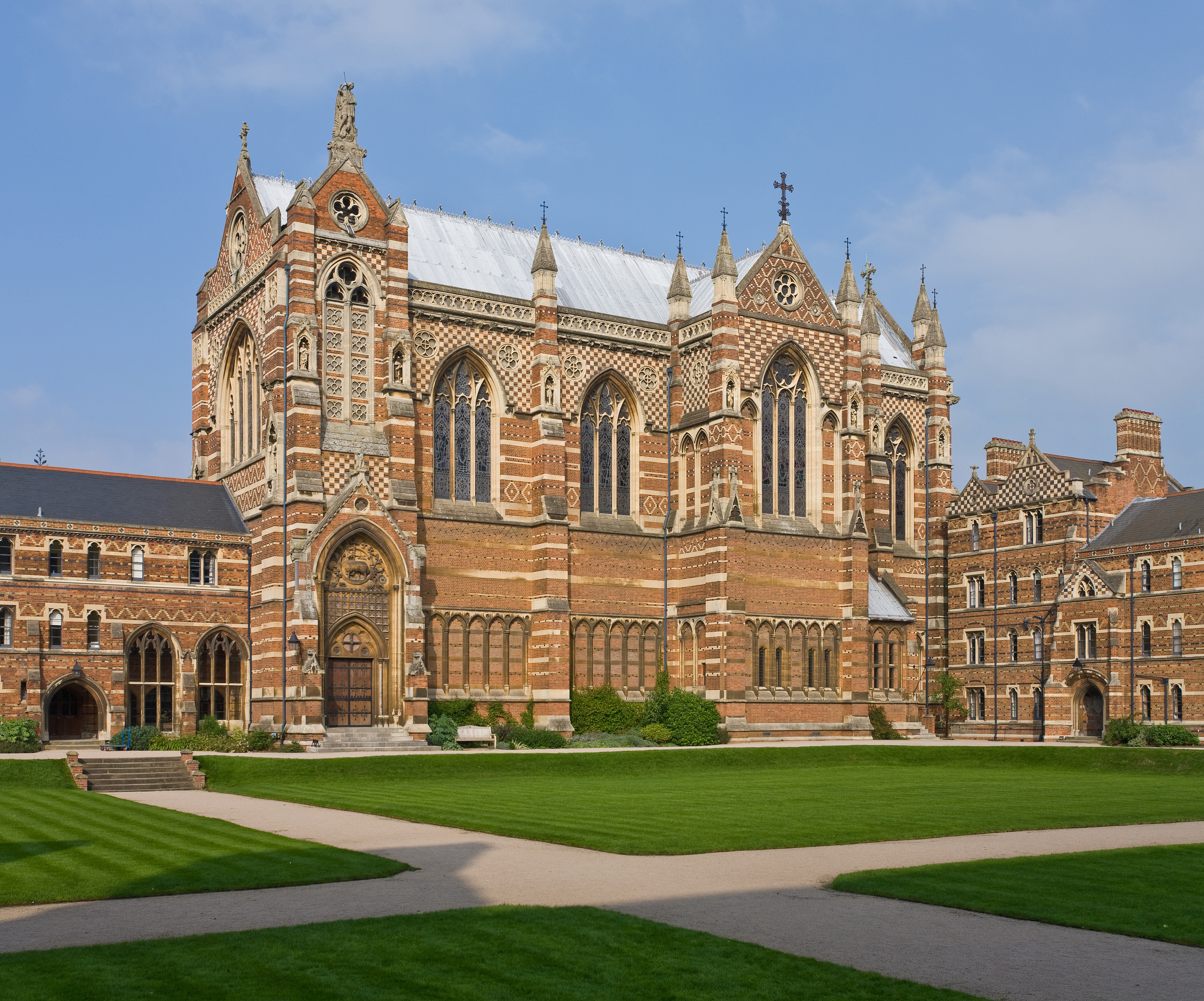
Keble College Chapel

- 1870
  - 6 & 23 June: Keble College, is incorporated and opens as a new foundation, the first new college in the university for more than a century. The first students enter in October.
  - Volunteer city fire brigade established, based in New Inn Hall Street.
  - Oxford University Gazette first published.
  - Eustreptospondylus oxoniensis juvenile dinosaur fossil found in Summertown.
- 1871
  - 18 June: The Universities Tests Act 1871 removes restrictions which limited access to the ancient universities to members of the Church of England (although the Congregation for the Propagation of the Faith at this time discourages attendance by Catholics).
  - 24 December: Merton College passes a special statute enabling four fellows to hold office after marrying. Historian Mandell Creighton (on 8 January 1872) is the first to be married.
  - Ruskin School of Drawing established in the University Galleries.
  - First issue of Oxford and Cambridge college stamps for postage by Keble College.
- 1872
  - 10 February: First of The Varsity Matches in rugby union played against Cambridge in The Parks; Oxford wins.
  - Oxford University A.F.C. established.
  - University's Clarendon Laboratory completed as the oldest purpose-built physics laboratory in England.
  - Oxford Cooperative & Industrial Society established with retail premises in George Street.
- 1873–1880
  - Christian Cole becomes the first black African to study at the university.
  - First city sewerage system laid, with pumping station at Littlemore.
- 1873
  - 29 March: 1873 FA Cup Final at Lillie Bridge in London: Oxford University A.F.C. loses; in the afternoon, the University Boat Club loses The Boat Race.
  - Oxfordshire Band of Hope & Temperance Union publish a Drink Map of Oxford showing 312 licensed premises and 7 breweries.
  - In the year following his death, Thomas Combe's widow, Martha, presents William Holman Hunt's painting The Light of the World to Keble College.
- 1874
  - 7 August: Second Hertford College founded in the university by the Hertford College Act 1874 (37 & 38 Vict. c. 55), changing the status of Magdalen Hall (on the site of the former Hart Hall).
  - Frank Cooper's Oxford marmalade first produced by his wife Sarah.
  - John Ruskin recruits a group of "diggers" from university undergraduates to repair the road to North Hinksey, including Oscar Wilde, Alfred Milner, Hardwicke Rawnsley, W. G. Collingwood and Arnold Toynbee.
- 1875
  - Church of St Aloysius Gonzaga established by Jesuits in Woodstock Road, designed by Joseph Hansom.
  - 3 November: Oxford High School opened by Girls' Day School Trust.
- 1876
  - 25 April (St Mark's Day): Keble College Chapel dedicated.
  - 7 June: Cowley Barracks opened. The 52nd (Oxfordshire) Light Infantry Regiment is among the forces first stationed here.
  - 7 September: Oxford Military College established as a private boarding school at Cowley; it goes bankrupt in 1896.
  - St Stephen's House established as a Church of England theological college by supporters of the Oxford Movement.
- 1877
  - 24 March: For the only time in history, the Boat Race with Cambridge is declared a "dead heat" (i.e. a draw).
  - 10 August: The Universities of Oxford and Cambridge Act 1877 (40 & 41 Vict. c. 48) removes most restrictions limiting fellowships in colleges of the universities to clergy of the Church of England and permits fellows to marry.
  - Wycliffe Hall founded as a Church of England theological college, beginning its teaching in January 1878.
  - First house built in New Marston.
  - Dragon School founded as the Preparatory School.
  - First telephone in Oxford.
- 1878
  - 22 June: Association for the Education of Women (AEW) founded to arrange lectures for women taking the new Oxford Examinations for Women over 18.
  - 26 September: First Oxford University Extension Lecture delivered, in Birmingham.
  - 18 October: Wesley Memorial Church opened in New Inn Hall Street.
  - Construction of houses on Cripley Meadow begins.
First two women's colleges

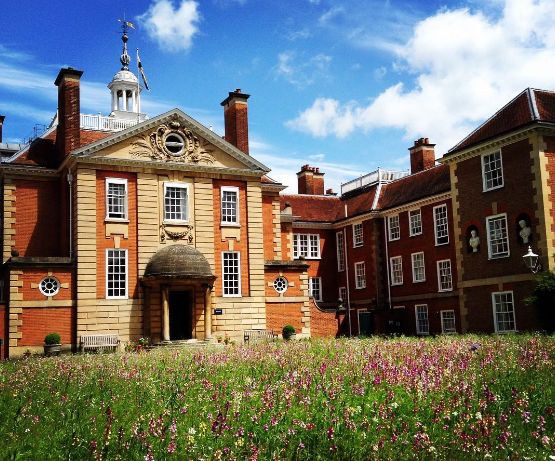
Lady Margaret Hall (1878)

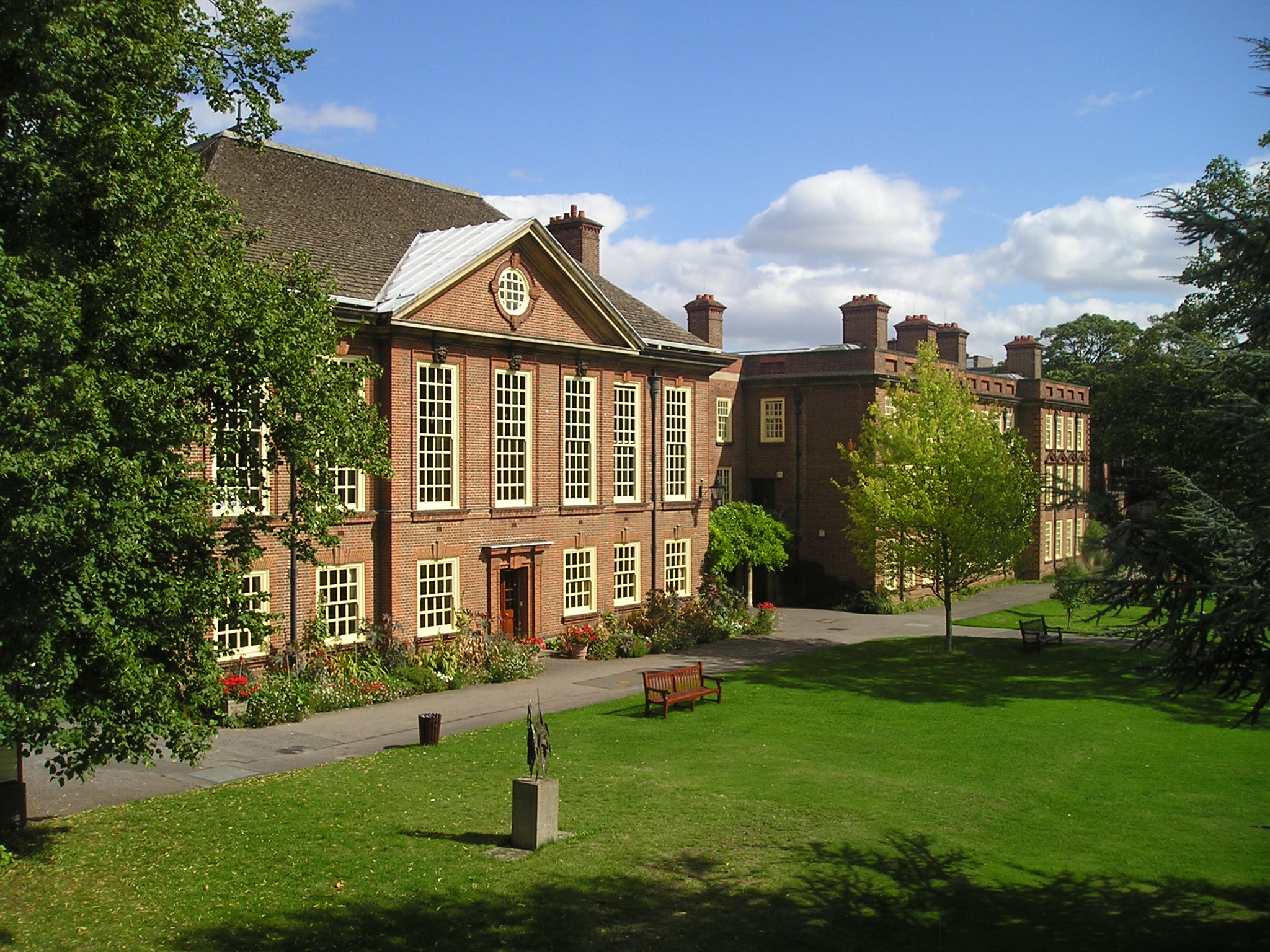
Somerville College (1879)

- 1879
  - 1 January: B. H. Blackwell (son of the city's first public librarian) opens the first Blackwell's bookshop.
  - 13 March: Gerard Manley Hopkins, at this time a curate at the new Church of St Aloysius Gonzaga, writes the poem "Binsey Poplars", marking their felling.
  - 13 October: First women students admitted to the newly opened Lady Margaret Hall, Somerville Hall and Society of Oxford Home-Students. Somerville is the first to appoint its own tutors, starting in 1882 with Lilla Haigh.
  - New General Post Office built in St Aldate's.
- 1881
  - 18 January: Severe gale.
  - May: First cricket matches in The Parks are played.
  - 1 December: City of Oxford Tramways Company opens its first route.
  - City of Oxford High School for Boys opened.
- 1882
  - 13 May: University Examination Schools, designed by T. G. Jackson, completed (on the site of the Angel Inn). The teaching functions formerly carried out in the Old Schools Quad of the Bodleian Library are transferred here.
  - Merton College absorbs St Alban Hall.
  - Approximate date: Oxford City F.C. established.
- 1883 – 24 January: The Oxford Magazine first published.
- 1884
  - 1 February: First fascicle of what will become the Oxford English Dictionary is published.
  - 9 October: Pusey Memorial House established in St Giles' to promote high church learning and worship.
  - 14 October: Indian Institute opened.
  - Women may take Honours (i.e. undergraduate) examinations of the university and their results are classified but they are not formally awarded degrees.
  - Pitt Rivers Museum established by donation of Augustus Pitt Rivers' anthropological and archaeological collections to the university.
- 1885
  - 29 April: Women first permitted to the take the university entrance examination.
  - May: Oxford University Dramatic Society's first production, Shakespeare's Henry IV, Part 1 produced by Alec MacKinnon in the old Town Hall.
  - 11 June: James Murray, editor of the Oxford English Dictionary, moves to a house on the Banbury Road to work full-time on the project.
  - 2 December: Osney Bridge collapses with one fatality.
- 1886
  - 13 February: Second New Theatre in George Street opens with an Oxford University Dramatic Society performance of Shakespeare's Twelfth Night.
  - October: Mansfield College, a nonconformist institution, moves to Oxford from Birmingham and adopts this name, originally setting up in The High.
  - St Hugh's College founded as St Hugh's Hall in Norham Road by Elizabeth Wordsworth for women of limited means.
  - Gasworks Bridge built.
- 1887 – Balliol College absorbs New Inn Hall.
- 1888
  - 13–14 February: Greatest snow depth on record in Oxford, 61 cm.
  - 31 December: Replacement iron Osney Bridge opened.
- 1889
  - 14–16 October: Mansfield College opens its new premises in Oxford.
  - 9 November: Oxford becomes a county borough under the Local Government Act 1888. City boundaries extended to incorporate part of Headington and New Hinksey. Management of Oxford Prison transfers from the county to Her Majesty's Prison Service.
  - Manchester College, a non-denominational institution of Presbyterian and Unitarian origins, moves to Oxford from London. Its new buildings are completed in 1893.
- 1889–1890 – Oxford county borough acquires sites for Wolvercote Cemetery, Rose Hill cemetery and Botley Cemetery, outside the city boundary at this time; they are dedicated in 1894 under the Interments Act (including on 1 April 1894 dedication of a Jewish burial ground at Wolvercote Cemetery).
- 1890 – December: Dullest month on record in Oxford, 5 hours of sunshine.
- 1891
  - Winter: River freezes solid at Folly Bridge.
  - Jane Willis Kirkaldy and Catherine Pollard become the first women to sit final examinations in biology at the university (and achieve first class honours).
- 1892
  - 27 April: The magazine Isis is established by university students.
  - 18 June: Oxford Electric Light Company established with riverside works at Osney.
  - 25 July: Community of the Resurrection established at Pusey House. It moves to Radley the following year, and subsequently to Mirfield in Yorkshire.
  - "Battle of Wolvercote": Resistance to reduction of Wolvercote Common.
  - First Romanes Lecture (founded by George Romanes in the university) delivered, by William Ewart Gladstone.
- 1893
  - 14 June: Opening of Shelley Memorial at University College, designed by Basil Champneys with a reclining nude marble statue of Shelley by Edward Onslow Ford.
  - 13 October: First women enter St Hilda's College (at this time a residential hall for students), founded by Dorothea Beale.
  - 27 October: Oxford United F.C. formed as Headington Football Club.
  - 27 December: Death of Thomas Combe's widow, Martha, who bequeaths most of their collection of Pre-Raphaelite paintings to the Ashmolean Museum.

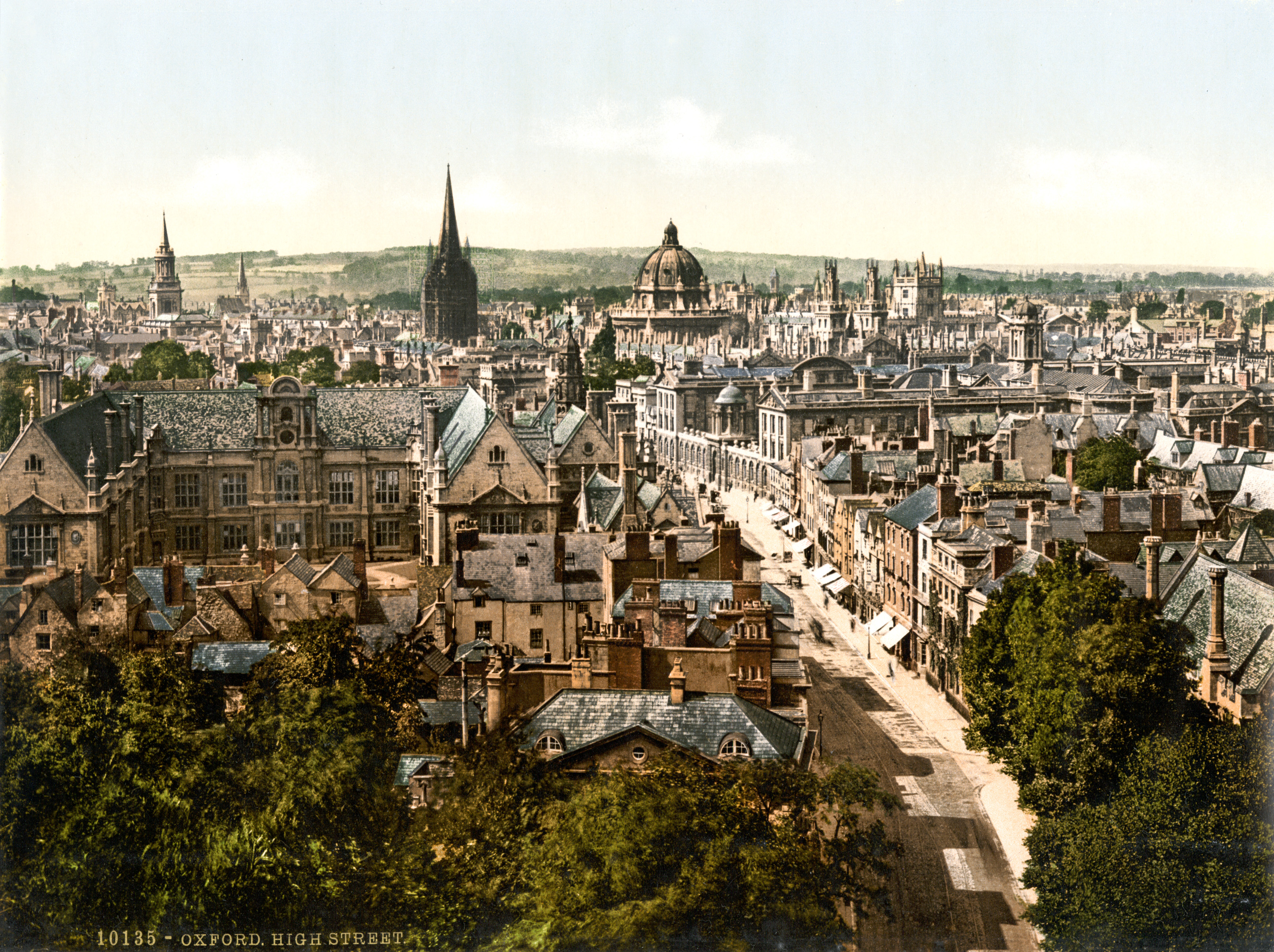
The High – Photochrom of c.1900

- 1894
  - 14 August: Oliver Lodge demonstrates radio transmission (of Morse code) from the Clarendon Laboratory to the University Museum for the British Association for the Advancement of Science.
  - October: William Holman Hunt's painting The Light of the World is first displayed in the side chapel constructed for it at Keble College.
  - November: Severe flooding. 126.1 mm of rain falls in Oxford this month.
- 1895
  - September: Corn Exchange and Fire Station complex opens in George Street.
  - 1 November: Thomas Hardy's novel Jude the Obscure is published in book form (dated 1896) containing an unflattering portrait of Oxford as "Christminster".
  - Winter: River freezes solid at Folly Bridge. The lowest February temperature in Oxford is −5.3 °C.
  - Roman Catholics are permitted by their hierarchy to attend the ancient universities.
  - Castle Mill Bridge rebuilt.
  - Oxford's first public toilet opened in St Giles'.
- 1896
  - 5 March: City of Oxford Drapers' Association adopts regular Thursday early closing (at 4pm) in its members' shops.
  - 7 September: The first film shown in Oxfordshire is screened as part of an entertainment at the New Theatre in George Street.
  - 9 September: Campion Hall established as Clarke's Hall in St Giles', a private hall for Jesuits studying in the university.
  - Francis Fortescue Urquhart becomes the first Roman Catholic teaching fellow in the university (at Balliol) since the Reformation.
  - St Martin's Church at Carfax is demolished, except for the tower.
- 1897
  - 12 May: New Oxford Town Hall, designed by Henry Hare, officially opened. It incorporates a pipe organ by Henry Willis & Sons.
  - 1 October: John Allen takes over the Oxfordshire Steam Ploughing Company.
  - October: The predecessor of St Benet's Hall is founded by Benedictines of Ampleforth for their members to study for secular degrees of the university, initially at 103 Woodstock Road.
- 1899
  - 27 February: Ruskin Hall begins to offer classes for mature working-class students.
  - 26 December: Headington Quarry morris dancer and concertina player William Kimber is first heard by musicologist Cecil Sharp, an important moment in the English folk dance and music revival. The Headington team had been revived for an exhibition dance on 13 March.

== 20th century ==
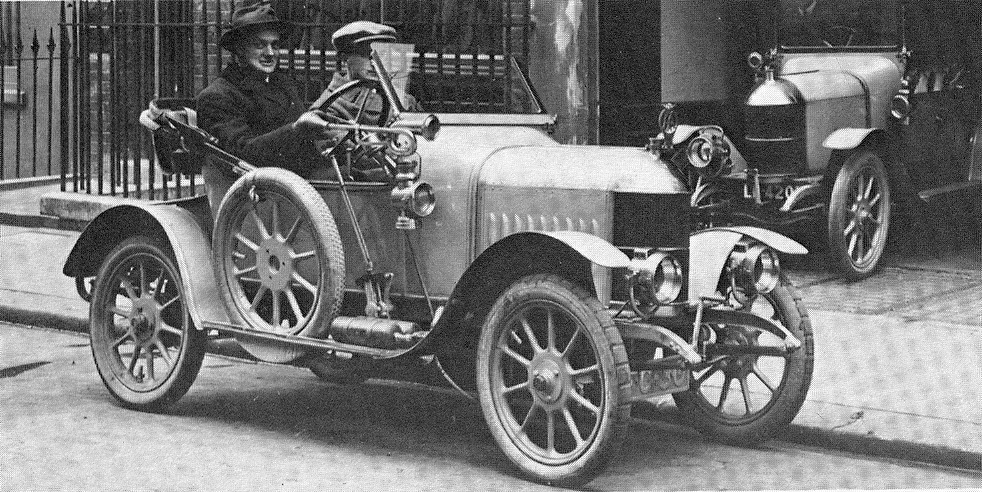
1913 "Bullnose" Morris Oxford

- 1900 – 6 July: Tirah Memorial unveiled.
- 1901 – 18 June: New building for Radcliffe Science Library, designed by T. G. Jackson, opened adjacent to University Museum.
- 1902
  - Rhodes Scholarship established for certain overseas students in the university with effect from 1 July 1903.
  - St Mary Hall, last survivor of the medieval academic halls in the university, is closed and reincorporated into Oriel College.
- 1903
  - June: Severe flooding. 141.8 mm of rain falls in Oxford this month.
  - 19 September: South African War Memorial unveiled at The Plain in St Clement's to commemorate the 33 men killed in action and 109 who died of disease serving with the 1st Battalion, Oxfordshire Light Infantry in the Second Boer War, 1899–1902.
  - The university establishes a faculty of modern languages, based in the Taylor Institution.
- 1904
  - Spring: Severe flooding. 81.7 mm of rain falls in Oxford in May.
  - Thornton and Thornton, a constituent of global accountancy business Grant Thornton, is established in Oxford.
  - Approximate date: Logic Lane covered bridge built for University College.
- 1905 – Order of Friars Minor Capuchin establish a friary, St Anselm's.
- 1906
  - 24 March: Oxford City F.C. win the FA Amateur Cup.
  - 12 May: Home for the Feeble-Minded at Cumnor, designed by Clough Williams-Ellis, officially opened.
- 1907
  - 27 June–3 July: Historical Pageant staged in grounds of Magdalen College School by Frank Lascelles.
  - 27 June: Recipients of honorary degrees of the university at this year's Encaenia include Rudyard Kipling, Mark Twain, Camille Saint-Saëns and Auguste Rodin.
  - 1 November: First female city councillor elected (Sophia Merivale).
  - North Oxford Golf Club founded.
- 1908
  - 26 April: Heavy snowfall.
  - 20 May: Iffley Mill destroyed by fire.
  - The Ashmolean Museum of Art and Archaeology is formed by merger of the old Ashmolean Museum and the University Galleries at the latter's location.
  - The first intelligence quotient test in England is administered to Oxford schoolchildren by Cyril Burt (based on the Binet system).
- 1909
  - March: Marxist students at Ruskin College, members of the Plebs' League, begin a strike in support of the dismissed Principal, Dennis Hird.
  - 13 March: An Amateur International Association football match between England and Germany is played at Oxford City's White House Ground: England (with Oxford City and university players in the front row) win 9–0.
  - 11 December: "Poulton's Match": In the 37th annual Varsity Match (rugby union) played in London, Oxford-born Ronnie Poulton scores a record five tries, securing the game for Oxford University RFC.
- 1910
  - 26 November: First permanent cinema in Oxford, the Oxford Electric Theatre in Castle Street, opens.
  - Women's halls formally recognised by the university.
  - Oxford Poetry founded as a literary magazine by publisher Basil Blackwell.
- 1911
  - 24 February: First purpose-built cinema in Oxford, the Oxford Picture Palace off the Cowley Road, opens. (On 25 March, the first purpose-built cinema in central Oxford, the Electra Palace in Queen Street, opens.)
  - 14 June: A Farnham pusher biplane lands on Port Meadow, the first aeroplane to land in Oxfordshire.
  - July: 1911 United Kingdom heat wave: Sunniest month on record in Oxford, 310.45 hours of sunshine.
  - 15 July: Roman Catholic parish church of St Edmund & St Frideswide (Greyfriars) opens in Iffley Road.
  - 26 October: Max Beerbohm's satirical novel Zuleika Dobson is published.
- 1912
  - Summer Olympics in Stockholm: New College Boat Club represent Great Britain in rowing, winning silver.
  - 10 September: Two Royal Flying Corps officers are killed when their Bristol Coanda monoplane crashes at Wolvercote. First aviation meeting held on Port Meadow on 24 October.
  - 27 November: An underground bookstore for the Bodleian Library beneath Radcliffe Square (begun late 1909) is completed, linked with both the old library and the Radcliffe Camera. The world's largest such store at this date, it incorporates innovative mobile shelving supposedly proposed by W. E. Gladstone, designed and manufactured by W. Lucy & Co. at the Eagle Ironworks.
  - C. Violet Butler publishes Social Conditions in Oxford.

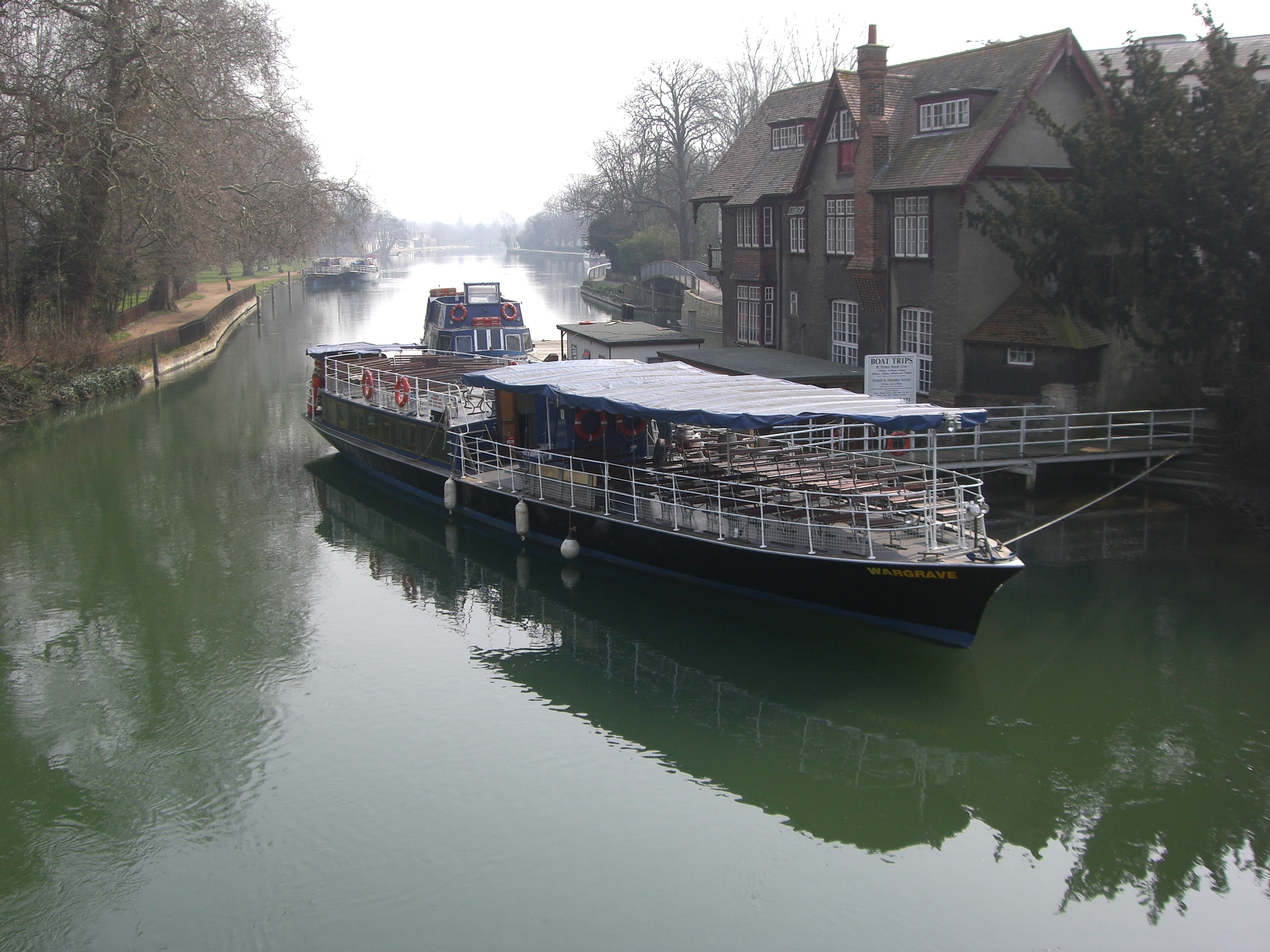
Salters steamer Wargrave (1913) by Folly Bridge

- 1913
  - February: Ruskin College opens its new premises in Walton Street.
  - 28 March: William Morris's Morris Oxford 2-seater car, assembled in Cowley, goes on sale.
  - c. October: Mansfield College admits its first woman student (Constance Todd). The first admitted on the same terms as men are in October 1979.
  - 5 December: William Morris and Frank Gray begin the city's first regular service of motor buses.
- 1914
  - 14 January: Hertford College's "Bridge of Sighs" opened.
  - 3 June: Encaenia: The majority of honorary doctorands are German or Austrian, including Richard Strauss.
  - 6 June: Barnett House established for the study of contemporary social problems.
  - 7–14 August (period): City of Oxford Tramways Company runs its last horse trams, having replaced them with motor buses.
  - 16 August: 3rd Southern General Hospital, a military hospital headquartered in the Examination Schools, set up. First patients arrive 13 September.
  - October: First refugees from Belgium arrive in Oxford; they are accommodated at Ruskin College and elsewhere.
- 1915
  - April: Somerville College is requisitioned for military hospital use and its members are evacuated to the former St Mary Hall in Oriel College until 1919.
  - September: Headington School is opened for girls by a group of evangelical Christians.
- 1916
  - May: Refugees from Serbia arrive in Oxford; they are accommodated at Wycliffe Hall initially.
  - 7 June: Dyson Perrins Laboratory inaugurated in the university for the study of organic chemistry.
- 1917
  - March: The city's first female police officer (Grace Costin) is employed, partly to counter the wartime rise in prostitution.
  - October: The main buildings of Pusey Memorial House on St Giles' are completed to the design of Temple Moore (the chapel had been dedicated on 10 October 1914).
  - The university introduces the Doctor of Philosophy (D.Phil.) degree on the American model.
- 1918 – 14 May: St Benet's Hall and Campion Hall are approved as Permanent Private Halls of the university under a statute of 5 February permitting such establishments.
- 1919
  - 1 April: Short-story writer A. E. Coppard (of Combe) leaves the clerical post he has held since 1907 at the Eagle Ironworks to become a professional author.
  - Ancient Greek ceases to be an entrance requirement for the university.
- 1920
  - 18 May: Women lecturers are given equal status to their male colleagues at the university.
  - 7 October: The first one hundred women are admitted to study for full degrees at the university.
  - 14 October: The first women receive degrees at the university, these being awarded retrospectively. Annie Rogers, Dorothy L. Sayers and Ivy Williams are among them.
  - October: Subscription concert series begins.
  - 9 November: Student newspaper Cherwell first published as a magazine.
- 1921
  - 11 March: Queen Mary becomes the first woman to be awarded an honorary degree by the university.
  - 13 July: City war memorial unveiled in St Giles'.
  - 15 August: The Dominican Order refounds Blackfriars.
  - 1 October: Plater College established as the Catholic Workers' College by Father Leo O'Hea S.J. Initially in temporary premises on Iffley Road, from 1923 to 1955 it is located in Walton Well Road.
- 1922
  - The University acquires Southfield Farm and commissions Harry Colt to lay out Southfield Golf Club, origin of Oxford Golf Club.
  - The city council buys the land for Botley Park.
- 1923
  - St Benet's Hall moves to the former St Ursula's Convent school in St Giles'.
  - 23 October: Oxford Playhouse opens as The Red Barn in the former Big Game Museum in Woodstock Road under the direction of J. B. Fagan with a performance of Shaw's Heartbreak House.
  - 11 November: Oxfordshire and Buckinghamshire Light Infantry war memorial at the foot of Rose Hill, designed by Sir Edwin Lutyens, is dedicated.
- 1924
  - 1 May: MG Cars established in Oxford. Production moves to Abingdon-on-Thames in 1929.
  - Christmas: Douglas Byng creates the first of his many camp pantomime dames as Eliza in Dick Whittington and His Cat at the New Theatre.
  - City of Oxford Motor Services opens a bus garage in Cowley Road, replacing the tram depot in Leopold Street. The Cowley Road garage closes in September 2004.
- 1925
  - 5 May: Museum of the History of Science opens in the Old Ashmolean building, set up by Robert Gunther based largely on the collection given by Dr. Lewis Evans (from 2019 known as the History of Science Museum).
  - 20 May: Oxford graduate C. S. Lewis is elected a Fellow of Magdalen College, where he serves as a tutor in English language and literature until 1954.
  - 7 September: City Council adopts Regional and Special Area Planning Schemes, including proposals for bypass roads.
  - 1 October: Oxford graduate J. R. R. Tolkien returns to the University as Rawlinson and Bosworth Professor of Anglo-Saxon.
  - First council houses in Oxford built in Headington.
- 1926
  - May: Oxford University Women's Boat Club founded.
  - 3–13 May: UK general strike.
  - 11 May: C. S. Lewis and J. R. R. Tolkien meet for the first time in Oxford.
  - Women's colleges are granted self-government by royal charter.
  - Pressed Steel Company plant at Cowley set up.
- 1927
  - 15 March: Oxford is declared the winner of the first inter-university Women's Boat Race rowed against a Cambridge crew on The Isis.
  - June: Regent's Park College, a Baptist institution originating in 1810, moves to Oxford from London.
  - 14 June: Quota introduced restricting the number of women at the university to this year's level; it is abolished from 1957.
  - 22 October: Oxford Preservation Trust holds its inaugural meeting, following preliminary moves in 1926 to secure vulnerable land around the city; it is incorporated on 14 November 1927.
  - Hide and Skin Market opened in St Thomas's.
- 1928
  - 15 February: The Oxford English Dictionary is completed after 70 years.
  - October: St Peter's College is founded by evangelical Bishop Francis Chavasse as a hostel for students of limited means in the university, on the site of New Inn Hall. A year later, as St Peter's Hall, it becomes a Permanent Private Hall.
  - 12 December: Oxford Mail founded as a successor to Jackson's Oxford Journal.
  - Ferry to Ferry Hinksey ceases operation.

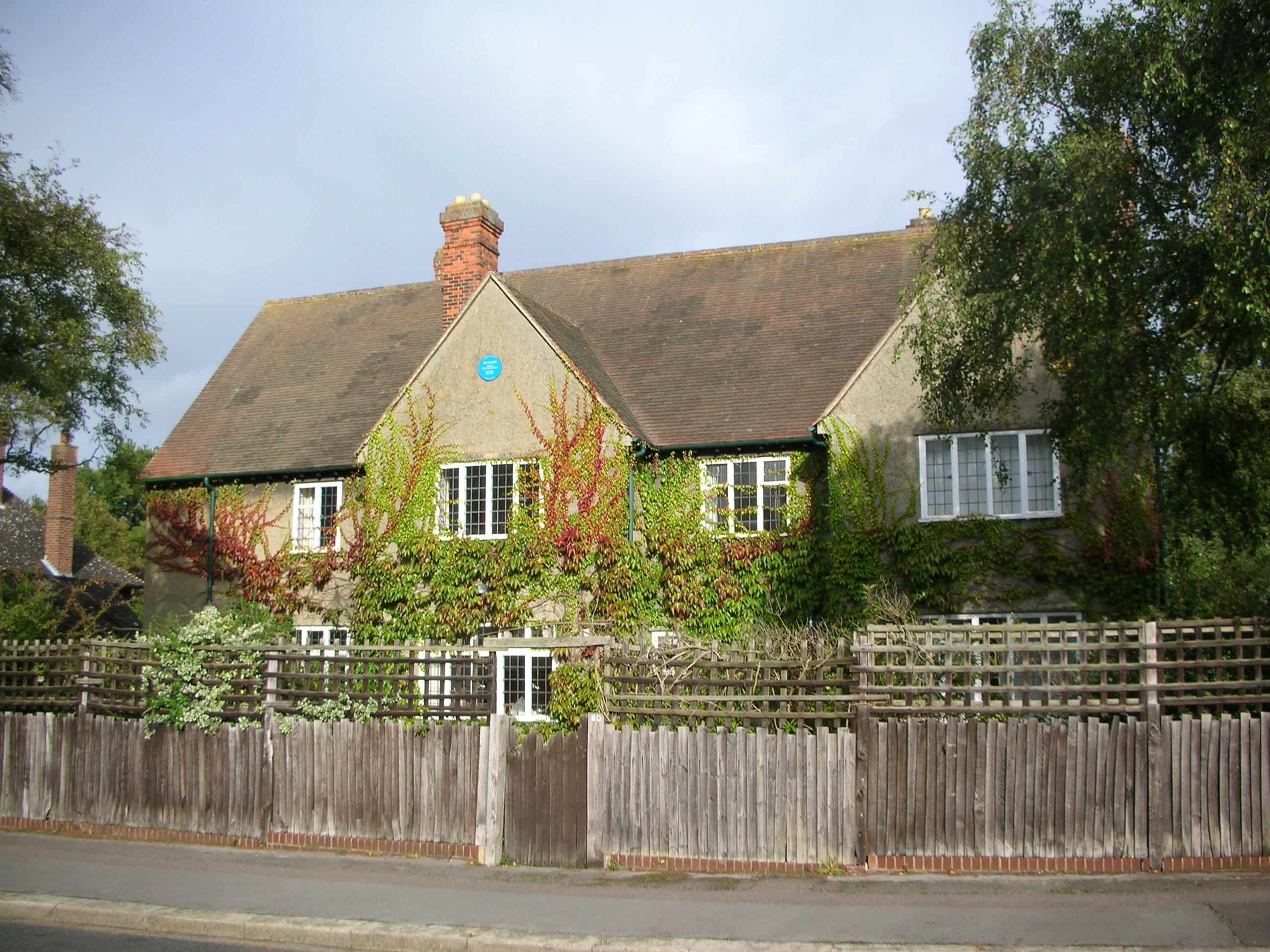
North Oxford home, successively of Basil Blackwell and J. R. R. Tolkien (20 Northmoor Road)

- 1929
  - 10 May: Rhodes House opened. Its library is a dependant of the Bodleian.
  - 20 May: Consecration of Blackfriars chapel.
  - City boundary extensions incorporate most of Cowley, Headington (including its cemetery) and New Marston together with portions of Iffley, Wolvercote and Cutteslowe. On 5 March, the Wolvercote Commoners' Committee is established to manage Wolvercote Common and preserve other village amenities.
  - Electric light introduced to the old Bodleian Library, the first installation of artificial light here.
  - 'Adam Broome' (Godfrey James)'s detective novel The Oxford Murders, pioneering the Oxbridge crime fiction genre, is published.
- 1930
  - Castle Mill demolished.
  - General Post Office opens a new sorting office close to the railway stations.
- 1931
  - May: Albert Einstein lectures at Rhodes House preparatory to spending the first of two summers resident at Christ Church.
  - 4 July: Oxford Zoo opens at Gosford, just outside the city; it closes at the end of summer 1936 and most of the animals are transferred to Dudley Zoo.
  - c. 1 August: Widow Annie Kempson is bludgeoned to death at her home in St Clement's, a crime for which Henry Seymour is tried and hanged in Oxford.
  - September: Franciscans open a new Greyfriars.
  - Non-collegiate students of the university recognised as St Catherine's Society.
  - Oxpens Road and bridge open as part of an inner ring road.
- 1932
  - July: Kenneth Grahame buried in Holywell Cemetery alongside his son Alastair; his royalties are bequeathed to the Bodleian Library.
  - 19 August: Joint warmest day on record in Oxford until 2022, 35.1 °C.
  - c. September: Merze Tate becomes the first African American woman to matriculate at the University of Oxford, as a member of the Society of Oxford Home-Students.
  - 14 December: South Park acquired by Oxford Preservation Trust.
  - Cattle market moved from Gloucester Green to Oxpens.
- 1933
  - 9 February: The King and Country debate: The Oxford Union passes a resolution stating, "That this House will in no circumstances fight for its King and country."
  - November
    - First female mayor of Oxford (Lily Tawney).
    - Oxford becomes the first place in Britain to introduce a 30 mph speed limit in its built-up areas.
  - An early school crossing patrol lady is introduced.
  - The name Inklings is taken by an informal university literary discussion group.
- 1934
  - 26 February: Rebuilt New Theatre in George Street opens.
  - 13–30 July: Pressed Steel Company workers take strike action.
  - 3 November: New wing doubling the size of the Radcliffe Science Library in Parks Road (under management of the Bodleian Library from 9 March 1927), designed by Hubert Worthington, opens.
  - December: Cutteslowe Walls first built.
  - Florence Park estate ("Little Wales") at Cowley built.
  - "Dame's Delight" opens as the Ladies' Pool, a family bathing place on the Cherwell (closed 1970).
- 1935 – Bus station at Gloucester Green opens (replacing that established in Castle Street in 1929), with the former Central School building retained as a waiting room.
- 1936
  - 7–10 January: First Oxford Farming Conference held.
  - 15 February: Exhibition Abstract and Concrete, curated by Nicolete Gray, opens at 41 St Giles', prior to touring England. It is the first showing of abstract art, and of the work of Mondrian, in the country.
  - 25 May: A meeting addressed by fascist leader Sir Oswald Mosley at the Carfax Assembly Rooms (on the corner of Cornmarket) turns violent in the Battle of Carfax.
  - 26 June: New building for Campion Hall, designed by Edwin Lutyens for Fr. Martin D'Arcy, opened.
  - 6 October: New building for St Catherine's Society in St Aldate's, designed by Lutyens' pupil Hubert Worthington, opened. A new police station is built next door.
  - 1 December: Site clearance in Broad Street for the New Bodleian Library building begins, with an early instance of archaeological site monitoring.
  - Belsyre Court, the first large block of flats in central Oxford, is completed on the Woodstock Road.
- 1937 – 16 November: Nuffield College is founded in the University by The Lord Nuffield as a graduate co-educational college for the study of the social sciences.
- 1938
  - June: Oxford Airport opened by the city council beyond its boundary at Kidlington. Formally inaugurated in July 1939, it will be requisitioned by the Royal Air Force on the outbreak of war.
  - 22 October: Oxford Playhouse opens in purpose-built premises designed by Edward Maufe in Beaumont Street with a performance of J. B. Fagan's And So To Bed.
  - 27 October: Parliamentary by-election, triggered by the death in August of Robert Bourne, member of parliament for Oxford since 1924 and held a month after the signing of the Munich Agreement. Pro-Appeasement candidate Quintin Hogg (Fellow of All Souls) retains the seat for the Conservatives but his majority is halved by Sandie Lindsay (Master of Balliol) standing as an Independent Progressive. Student campaigners for Lindsay include Denis Healey, Edward Heath and Roy Jenkins (all from Balliol) and Iris Murdoch.
  - 21 November–3 December: Picasso's Guernica (in facsimile) is exhibited with preliminary sketches at Oriel College by Denis Healey to raise awareness of the Spanish Civil War.
- 1939
  - 31 March: Oxford Stadium at Cowley is opened for organised greyhound racing. On 8 April dirt track motorcycle speedway racing is introduced here.
  - May: Oxford Crematorium opens.
  - 21 June: P. G. Wodehouse is awarded an honorary doctorate of letters by the university. His visit for the ceremony is the last time he will set foot in England.
  - September: C. S. Lewis first narrates stories which will form The Chronicles of Narnia to child evacuees sharing his home at The Kilns; June Flewett is a housekeeper.
  - c. September: Slade School of Fine Art evacuated from London to join the Ruskin School of Drawing at the Ashmolean Museum for the duration of the war.
- 1940
  - 17 May: John Fulljames shoots and kills a fellow student in the Front Quadrangle of University College.
  - Summer: New Bodleian Library building is substantially completed. Books stored on the ground floor of the Radcliffe Camera since 1863 are moved in and the remainder of the new building used for various wartime functions.
  - 24 August: Howard Florey and a team including Ernst Chain, Arthur Duncan Gardner, Norman Heatley, M. Jennings, J. Orr-Ewing and G. Sanders at the university's Sir William Dunn School of Pathology publish their laboratory results showing the in vivo bactericidal action of penicillin. They have also purified the drug.
  - 11 September: The Majestic Cinema (originally built as an ice rink) in Botley Road is taken over as emergency accommodation for evacuees from The Blitz in the East End of London.
- 1941
  - 12 February: Reserve Constable Albert Alexander, a sepsis patient at the Radcliffe Infirmary becomes the first person treated with penicillin intravenously, by Howard Florey's team, injected by Dr Charles Fletcher. He reacts positively but there is insufficient supply of the drug to reverse his terminal infection. A successful treatment is achieved during May.
  - 4 May: A bomber from RAF Abingdon crashes at the eastern end of Linton Road with fatalities.
  - 5 May: Kingsley Amis and Philip Larkin meet while both reading English at St John's College.
  - May: Ground floor of the Radcliffe Camera is opened as an additional reading room for the Bodleian Library.
  - 17 October: Harris Manchester College is requisitioned for use by Naval Intelligence and the Inter-Services Topographical Department.

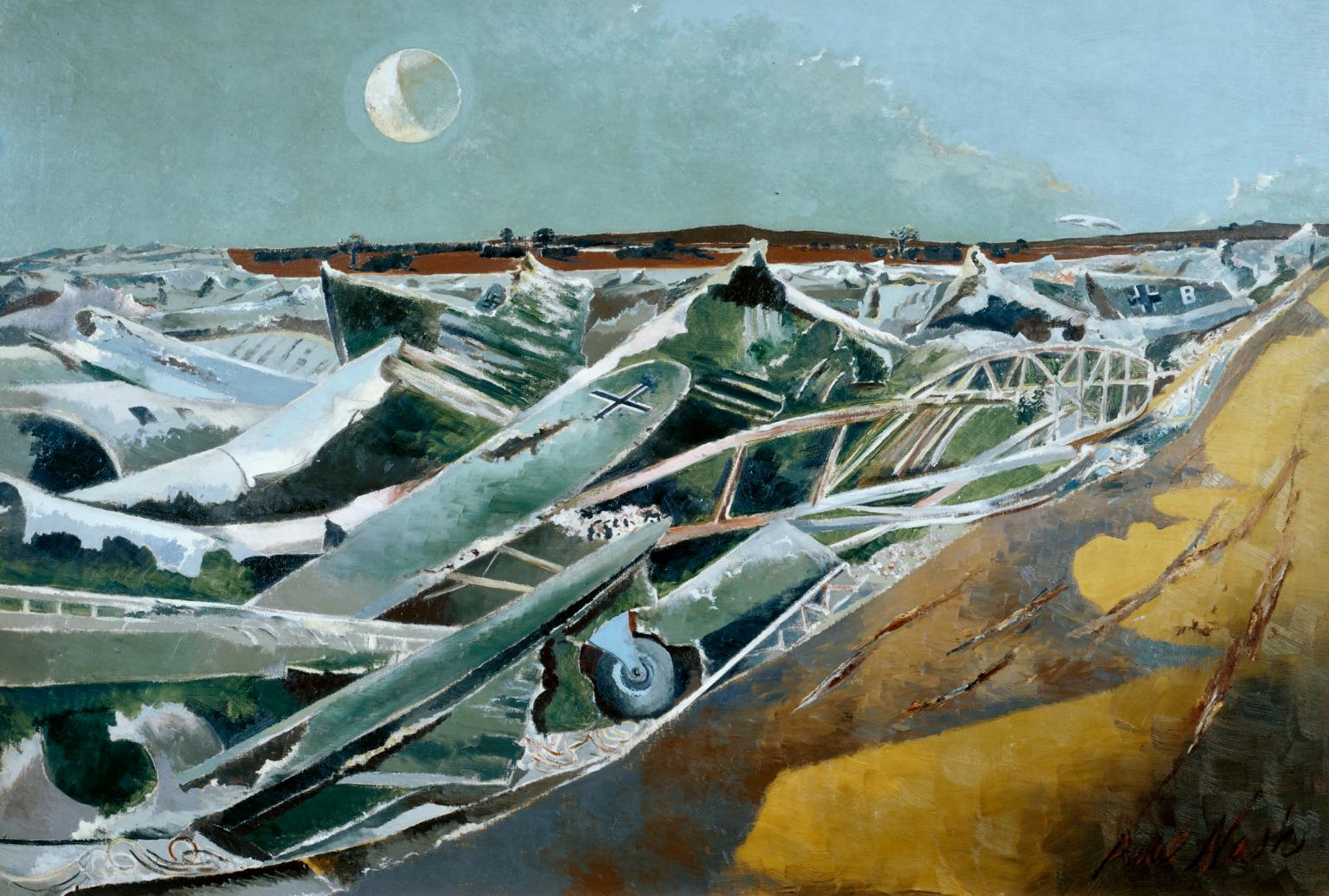
Wartime aircraft scrap dump at Cowley as portrayed in Paul Nash's Totes Meer

- 1942
  - 1 January: New Churchill Hospital buildings occupied as 2nd General Hospital of the United States Army Medical Department.
  - 5 October: Oxford Committee for Famine Relief is founded in the old library of the University Church.
  - Probable date: Prisoner-of-war camp 43 built at Harcourt Hill (North Hinksey).
- 1943
  - c.6–7 March: In "Exercise Spartan", a major rehearsal for next year's Allied Invasion of Normandy, Oxford is taken from the "enemy".
  - University acquires Wytham Woods.
- 1944 – 'Edmund Crispin' (Bruce Montgomery)'s comic detective novel The Case of the Gilded Fly (written the previous Easter while he was an undergraduate), introducing his amateur sleuth Prof. Gervase Fen, is published.
- 1945
  - January: First woman given a professorship in the university, ophthalmologist Ida Mann.
  - 8 May: Victory in Europe Day is celebrated in the city with bonfires, illuminations and street parties.
  - May: Evelyn Waugh's novel Brideshead Revisited is published, opening with a portrait of the 1920s Oxford set.
  - 23 July: Dorothy Hodgkin publishes the first three-dimensional molecular structure of a steroid, cholesteryl iodide.
- 1946
  - 26 March: City twinned with Leiden in the Netherlands.
  - September: Thomas Sharp produces a plan for postwar rebuilding of Oxford.
  - 1 October: Mensa, an international organisation for people with a high intelligence quotient, is founded by Roland Berrill, an Australian-born eccentric, and Dr Lancelot Ware, a biochemist at this time studying law at Lincoln College, in Oxford.
  - 24 October: New Bodleian Library building is officially opened by George VI. It is linked by tunnel under Broad Street to the old library.
- 1947
  - March: Severe flooding. 132.9 mm of rain falls in Oxford this month.
  - December: First permanent Oxfam charity shop begins trading, in Broad Street. Its first dedicated bookshop opens in 1987, in St Giles'.
  - City twinned with Bonn, West Germany.
  - The university's Oxford Swift Research Project, based on the colony at the University Museum, is started by David and Elizabeth Lack. It will still be running more than sixty years later.
- 1948 – 20 September: New Morris Minor launched.
- 1949
  - 21 April: Foundation stone of Nuffield College is laid on the site of a canal basin; it is substantially completed in 1958.
  - June: Oxford University Dramatic Society production of Shakespeare's The Tempest beside Worcester College lake, directed by Nevill Coghill.
  - Footbridge over Cherwell near Parson's Pleasure, probably the world's first prestressed concrete fixed-arch bridge, designed by Alfred Goldstein of R. Travers Morgan & Partners.

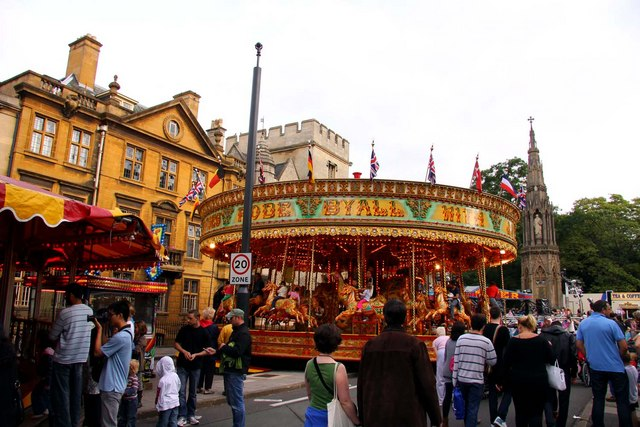
St Giles' Fair

- 1950
  - 3 February: Oxford University parliamentary constituency abolished; the last sitting members (since 1945) are Sir Arthur Salter and A. P. Herbert.
  - 9 October: St Antony's College, founded by gift of Sir Antonin Besse in 1948, admits its first (graduate) students. It occupies the original Halifax House in Woodstock Road (a former convent at this time leased from St John's College).
- 1951
  - June: Arthur Lehman Goodhart becomes the first American and the first Jew to head an Oxford college on being elected Master of University College.
  - 2–16 July: Arts festival held in Oxford in connection with the Festival of Britain.
  - September–October: Small epidemic of Bornholm disease.
  - 1 October: Rewley Road railway station closed to passengers.
- 1952
  - Early: Jacob Epstein's sculpture Lazarus (1948) is installed in the antechapel of New College.
  - 9 April: Keble College's statutes are amended to give it full rights as a constituent college of the university.
  - 19 May: St Anne's College chartered as a full college for women in the university.
  - 12 August: Last hanging at Oxford Prison.
- 1953
  - 1 April: St Antony's College chartered.
  - 9 October: Severe fire at St Michael at the North Gate caused by arson.
  - St Clare's opened as a tutorial institution, The Oxford English Centre for Foreign Students.
  - City Council completes a 20-year Development Plan.
- 1954
  - 12 January: First listed buildings in Oxford.
  - 6 May: Oxford graduate Roger Bannister becomes the first person in the world to break the four-minute mile, at the university's Iffley Road Track.
  - October: City of Oxford Motor Services recruit bus conductors from Jamaica.
  - November: Severe flooding. 112.2 mm of rain falls in Oxford this month.
- 1955
  - 20 August: Dorothy Hodgkin publishes the structure of vitamin B_{12}, for which she will be awarded the Nobel Prize in Chemistry.
  - Mansfield College becomes a Permanent Private Hall of the university.
- 1956
  - 21 April
    - Delegates agree to incorporate St Catherine's College as a full college within the university.
    - Nikita Khrushchev and Nikolai Bulganin visit Oxford as part of a Soviet state visit to Britain.
  - 23 April: Civil marriage of C. S. Lewis and Joy Gresham at Oxford register office.
  - 14 August: Iris Murdoch marries John Bayley at the register office.
- 1957–1959 – First examples of modernist architecture in Oxford constructed: buildings in the university science area by Basil Ward and new college boathouses.
- 1957
  - 15 February: St Edmund Hall granted status as a full college of the university but retains its traditional name (charter dated 27 March).
  - 21 March: C. S. Lewis marries Joy Gresham in a Christian ceremony at her bedside in the Churchill Hospital.
  - May: Oxford Historic Buildings Fund established to assist replacement of decayed stonework.
  - c. October: Blackbird Leys estate construction begins; first houses occupied 1958.
  - Regent's Park College becomes a permanent private hall of the university.
- 1958
  - Green belt adopted in planning.
  - 13 December: Lonnie Donegan's transatlantic hit skiffle cover of "Does Your Chewing Gum Lose Its Flavour (On the Bedpost Overnight?)" is recorded at the New Theatre.
- 1959
  - 9 March: Cutteslowe Walls demolished permanently.
  - April: Visit of Queen Elizabeth II.
  - 8 May: First production Morris Mini-Minor from the Cowley plant.
  - July: Westminster College, a Methodist teacher training institution established in 1851, moves from London to new premises on Harcourt Hill.
  - 22 August: Ron Atkinson makes his playing debut for Headington United F.C. under manager Arthur Turner. Atkinson will spend his entire playing career (until 1971) at Oxford, rapidly rising to captain; his brother Graham makes his playing debut on 2 September.
  - 20 October: Women's colleges are granted status as full colleges of the university.
  - Grandpont House becomes a study centre for the Catholic organisation Opus Dei.
  - Oxford Instruments established.
- 1960
  - Early: St John's College's "Beehives" completed, first substantial student accommodation in a modern architectural style (designed by Architects' Co-Partnership).
  - 31 March: Oxford gasworks closes, the city receiving remote supply.
  - 4 November: Visit of Queen Elizabeth II to lay the foundation stone for St Catherine's College.
  - Oxford College of Further Education founded.
  - The university abolishes Responsions.
- 1961
  - 24 January: St Peter's College granted the status of a full college in the university.
  - 14 March: The New English Bible (New Testament) is co-published by Oxford University Press.
  - Brasenose College Staircases 16, 17 and 18 completed, first academic building by Powell and Moya.
  - A34 Road Bridge over the Thames built.
- 1962
  - 29 January: Oxford transmitting station at Beckley begins relaying BBC radio and television.
  - 9 April: Windrush Tower, the first tower block at Blackbird Leys, is opened.
  - 2 June: Oxford United F.C., champions of the Southern League, are elected to The Football League in place of Accrington Stanley.
  - 1 August: Linacre College is founded as Linacre House, a graduate society in the university.
  - October: St Catherine's College admits its first students (official opening 16 October 1964).
  - 22 October: Donnington Bridge opened.
  - 23 October: Style of Mayor of Oxford elevated to Lord Mayor by letters patent.
  - 5 November: Rioting.
  - Women are allowed to become members of the Oxford Union student debating society.
- 1963
  - 16 February: The Beatles play their only live gig in Oxfordshire, at the Carfax Assembly Rooms (on the corner of Cornmarket).
  - St Antony's College becomes a full college of the university.
  - Women are allowed to become members of the Oxford University Dramatic Society.
  - Harcourt Arboretum at Nuneham Courtenay (south of the city) becomes a satellite of the University of Oxford Botanic Garden.
- 1964 – University's St Cross Building, designed by Leslie Martin and Colin St John Wilson, completed.
- 1965
  - March: Ring road over Isis Bridge opened.
  - Trinity Term: Wolfson College (as Iffley College) is founded as a graduate institution in the university.
  - 11 May: Cowley Centre opened.
  - 1 October: St Cross College is founded as a graduate institution in the university.
  - Templeton College is founded as Oxford Centre for Management Studies.
  - Telephone House built.
- 1966
  - 3 January: Last steam train operated by the Western Region of British Railways from Oxford.
  - 14 February: Oxford University Dramatic Society production of Marlowe's Doctor Faustus at Oxford Playhouse with Richard Burton and Elizabeth Taylor, directed by Nevill Coghill, opens.
  - 26 March: Commission of Enquiry into the University of Oxford chaired by Lord Franks completes its report.
  - 31 March: UK general election: Evan Luard becomes the only person to take the undivided Oxford parliamentary constituency for Labour.
  - 16 June: Blackwell's open the 930 m^{2} underground Norrington Room in their main bookshop in Broad Street as part of a joint development with Trinity College.
  - 18 June: At a drunken gig at Queen's College, Jimmy Page agrees to take over bass guitar for The Yardbirds after Paul Samwell-Smith quits.
  - September: Museum of Modern Art Oxford established in the former City Brewery in Pembroke Street, following the use of a temporary exhibition space since late 1965.
  - October: Seacourt Tower opened by Hartwell Motors.
- 1967 – University's Nuclear Physics Laboratory in Banbury Road built.
- 1968
  - 2 May: The largely underground Christ Church Picture Gallery, designed by Powell and Moya, is opened.
  - 10 July: Wettest day on record in Oxford, 87.9 mm of rain.
- 1969
  - 1 April: Thames Valley Police formed by amalgamation of Oxford City Police, Oxfordshire Constabulary and other local forces. Headquarters are at Kidlington.
  - May: St Hilda's College provides the first women's rowing crew to qualify for Eights Week.
  - 24 June: An explosives expert blows up himself and his house at Littlemore.
  - 27 November: Oxford Civic Society formed.
  - Dorothy Hodgkin and university colleagues determine the structure of insulin.
- 1970–72 – Original Westgate Shopping Centre built.

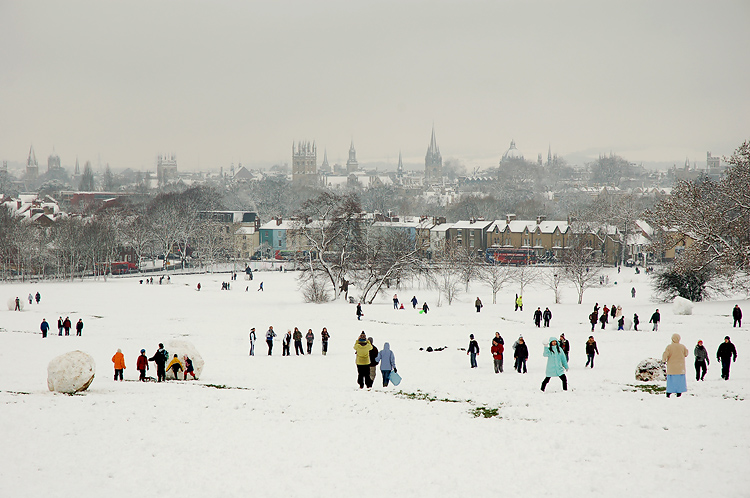
Oxford's dreaming spires from South Park

- 1970
  - 27 February–1 March: First National Women's Liberation Conference held at Ruskin College.
  - 24 April: Oxford College of Technology at Headington becomes Oxford Polytechnic.
  - 29 October: BBC Radio Oxford begins broadcasting, from studios in Summertown.
- 1971
  - Florey Building in St Clement's completed as residential accommodation for Queen's College, one of architect James Stirling's "red trilogy" of English academic buildings.
  - October–November: Inner relief road through Christ Church Meadow, a scheme first officially proposed in 1945, is finally rejected.
  - 12 November: Marston Ferry Road opened, replacing the ferry over the Cherwell.
- 1972 – July: Phase 1 of the John Radcliffe Hospital, the maternity unit, opens at Headington. Main block opens 1979.
- 1973
  - September: J. R. R. Tolkien buried in Wolvercote Cemetery alongside his wife Edith ("Beren" and "Lúthien").
  - October: First woman elected as a fellow in a previously all-male college of the university, Dr. Carol Clark at Balliol.
  - 31 October: New Oxford Central Library opened at the Westgate Shopping Centre.
  - December: Permanent park and ride facility for the city begins.
- 1974
  - 31 March: Local Government Act 1972 comes into effect ending formal university representation on the city council.
  - October: Five previously all-male colleges admit women undergraduates for the first time, initially on a trial basis (Brasenose, Hertford, Jesus, St Catherine's and Wadham).
  - Building of Wolfson College beside the River Cherwell is completed (architects: Powell & Moya; foundation stone laid 2 May 1968).
- 1975
  - January: Colin Dexter's detective novel Last Bus to Woodstock, introducing his Oxford police officer Inspector Morse, is published.
  - The university administration moves to new offices in Wellington Square from the Clarendon Building, which becomes offices for the Bodleian Library.
  - The Museum of Oxford is founded in Oxford Town Hall.
  - The Center for Medieval and Renaissance Studies is founded as an educational charity by Drs John and Sandy Feneley, establishing a facility at the Victorian St. Michael's Hall (Shoe Street) in 1978; in 2014 it becomes part of the American Middlebury College Schools Abroad.
- 1976
  - 2 January: Severe gale.
  - 19 July–27 August: 1976 British Isles heat wave: Longest period of absolute drought on record in Oxford.
  - New underground reading room for Radcliffe Science Library (part of the university's Bodleian Library), designed by Jack Lankester, opened beneath the University Museum lawn.
- 1977
  - The university permits colleges to extend co-educational admissions.
  - City of Oxford Motor Services introduces a direct Oxford to London coach route via the M40 motorway.
  - French chef Raymond Blanc opens the first restaurant of his own, Les Quat' Saisons in Summertown.
- 1979
  - 21 March: Last cattle market at Oxpens. Last general market held here 28 July 1982, having reverted to Gloucester Green.
  - 1 September: Green College is opened in the university on the site of the Radcliffe Observatory for the study of human welfare, following a gift from Cecil Howard Green.
- 1980
  - St Stephen's House moves to the East Oxford site vacated by the Society of St. John the Evangelist.
  - John B. Goodenough, working with colleagues at the university's Inorganic Chemistry Laboratory, identifies the cathode material that enables development of the rechargeable lithium-ion battery.
  - First commercial MRI whole body scanner manufactured by Oxford Instruments at Osney Mead for installation at Hammersmith Hospital, London.
- 1981
  - 4 April: The Boat Race 1981 – Susan Brown, a 23-year-old biology student, becomes the first female cox in a winning Boat Race crew.
  - September: St Cross College moves to part of the Pusey House site in St Giles' as its main location.
  - Susan Hurley becomes the first female Fellow of All Souls.
- 1982
  - 20 July: Allen Hill and colleagues at the university develop a glucose biosensor.
  - September: Privileged, the first release for the Oxford University Film Foundation, provides significant screen debuts for Hugh Grant, Imogen Stubbs, Mark Williams and composer Rachel Portman.
  - November: Helen House, the world's first children's hospice, is set up by Sister Frances Dominica.
- 1983 – Oxford Centre for Management Studies renamed Templeton College.
- 1984
  - John Allen ceases production at its Cowley works.
  - 1 December: Oxford Ice Rink opened.
- 1985
  - 29 January: Somerville graduate Margaret Thatcher becomes the first post-war Prime Minister to be refused an honorary degree by the university.
  - 4 July: 13-year-old Ruth Lawrence of St Hugh's College achieves a first in Mathematics, becoming the youngest British person ever to earn a first-class degree.
  - Oxford Centre for Islamic Studies established.
- 1986
  - 20 April: Oxford United, in the First Division for the first time, win the Football League Cup with a 3–0 victory over Queens Park Rangers at Wembley.
  - 1 August: Linacre College chartered as a full college in the university.
  - 9 August: The Headington Shark, designed by John Buckley, is installed on the roof of Bill Heine's home.
  - Late: Alternative rock band Radiohead, as "On a Friday", play their first gig, at the Jericho Tavern.
  - City formally twinned with León, Nicaragua.
- 1987
  - 6 January: The Inspector Morse television series begins airing on ITV with "The Dead of Jericho" with location scenes filmed the previous summer in Oxford.
  - 7 March: Thames Transit begins operations with high-frequency minibus service in Oxford and introduction of Oxford Tube express coach service to London via the M40 motorway.
- 1988
  - 2 August: Oxford Summer Piano Series founded by Jack Gibbons.
- 1989
  - 28 April: Oxford University Press Printing House closes, being succeeded on 2 May by Oxuniprint. The last book off the press is Views of Oxford.
  - May: Members of the National Union of Journalists begin a picket of Robert Maxwell's Headington Hill Hall headquarters of Pergamon Press which lasts until September 1992.
  - 15 September: Fox FM begins radio broadcasting from Cowley.
  - 26 October: Gloucester Green reopens after redevelopment with shops and flats.
  - City twinned with Grenoble, France.
- 1990
  - 1 March: Kellogg College established at Rewley House for the education of external part-time students in the university.
  - 8 April: Oxford railway station rebuilt.
  - 3 August: Joint warmest day on record in Oxford until 2022, 35.1 °C.
  - Pembroke College opens its Geoffrey Arthur Building beside the Isis in Grandpont.
  - Oxford Science Park established.
  - Tumbling Bay swimming area is closed down.
- 1991
  - 14 April: Murder of Rachel McLean, a St Hilda's student, by her boyfriend.
  - 3 September: National outbreaks of rioting extend to Blackbird Leys.
  - "Parson's Pleasure" gentlemen's nude bathing place on the Cherwell is closed.
- 1992 – 4 June: Oxford Polytechnic, in common with most British polytechnics, is given the power to award degrees in its own right, giving it the status of a new university; on 16 November its change of name to Oxford Brookes University is approved.
- 1993
  - February: Alternative rock band Supergrass formed.
  - 26 March: Veronica Stallwood's detective novel Death and The Oxford Box, introducing her historical novelist sleuth Kate Ivory, is published.
  - Oxford Oratory established as an independent congregation.
- 1994
  - 1 October: Kellogg College so named.
  - Blackfriars Hall becomes a permanent private hall of the University of Oxford.
  - Oxford University Press last uses flatbed letterpress printing.

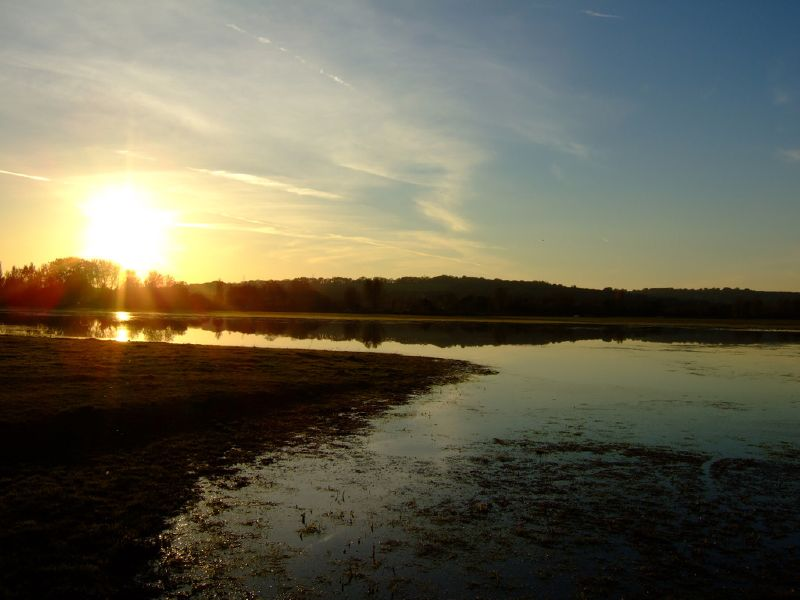
Port Meadow

- 1995
  - 11 April: Mansfield College chartered as a full college in the University of Oxford.
  - July: Philip Pullman's young-adult fantasy novel Northern Lights, opening in a parallel-universe Oxford, first of the His Dark Materials trilogy, is published.
  - City twinned with Perm, Russia, following academic links established since 1985 (formal twinning 2001; de facto suspended 2022).
- 1996
  - Harris Manchester College becomes a full college of the University of Oxford under this name.
  - Saïd Business School formed from the University of Oxford's School of Management Studies.
  - Wycliffe Hall becomes a permanent private hall of the University of Oxford.
  - First Oxford Literary Festival.
- 1997
  - 28 February: Lucy's make the last casting at Eagle Ironworks.
  - North Commission of Inquiry into the University of Oxford.
- 1998
  - April: Severe flooding. 107.7 mm of rain falls in Oxford this month.
  - Morrells cease brewing at the Lion Brewery.
- 1999
  - 18 June: Oxford Broadcasting launches The Oxford Channel as the UK's last free-to-air analogue terrestrial television operation under a restricted service licence, operating from a studio converted from a wartime bunker on the Woodstock Road; it shuts down on 3 April 2009.
  - 31 December: Cézanne's painting View of Auvers-sur-Oise is stolen from the Ashmolean Museum.
  - Cornmarket pedestrianised and most through traffic diverted from The High.

== 21st century ==
- 2000
  - 5 April: Westminster College merges into Oxford Brookes University.
  - 7 July: Millennium foot and cycle bridge over A40 ring road at Cutteslowe is opened.
  - 20 June: Cardiac surgeon Stephen Westaby and team at the John Radcliffe Hospital perform the first successful implantation of a permanent electrical artificial heart.
  - End: BMW begin production of the new Mini car at Plant Oxford (on the former Pressed Steel site at Cowley).
  - Hertford College opens its graduate centre adjacent to Folly Bridge.
- 2001
  - First Cowley Road Carnival.
  - 4 August: Oxford United F.C. move from Manor Ground to the Kassam Stadium.
  - 1 November: The University of Oxford's Saïd Business School new building is opened on the site of Rewley Road railway station.
  - 4 November: Release of the film Harry Potter and the Philosopher's Stone with scenes filmed earlier in the year in parts of the Bodleian Library. Dragon and Headington School pupil Emma Watson is cast in a major rôle.
  - Oxford University Student Union radio station Oxygen FM is replaced by Fusion FM (later Oxide Radio).
- 2003
  - Oxford University Police ("Bulldogs") abolished.
  - The Story Museum founded, initially as a virtual museum.
  - Oxford Buddha Vihara founded.
- 2004 – Late: Oxford Central Mosque in Manzil Way opens.
- 2005
  - July: Plater College closes.
  - 18 October: Jack FM begins radio broadcasting from Oxford.
  - University of Oxford Future of Humanity Institute founded.
  - Lucy's cease manufacturing at Eagle Ironworks; the site is fully redeveloped for housing by December 2008.

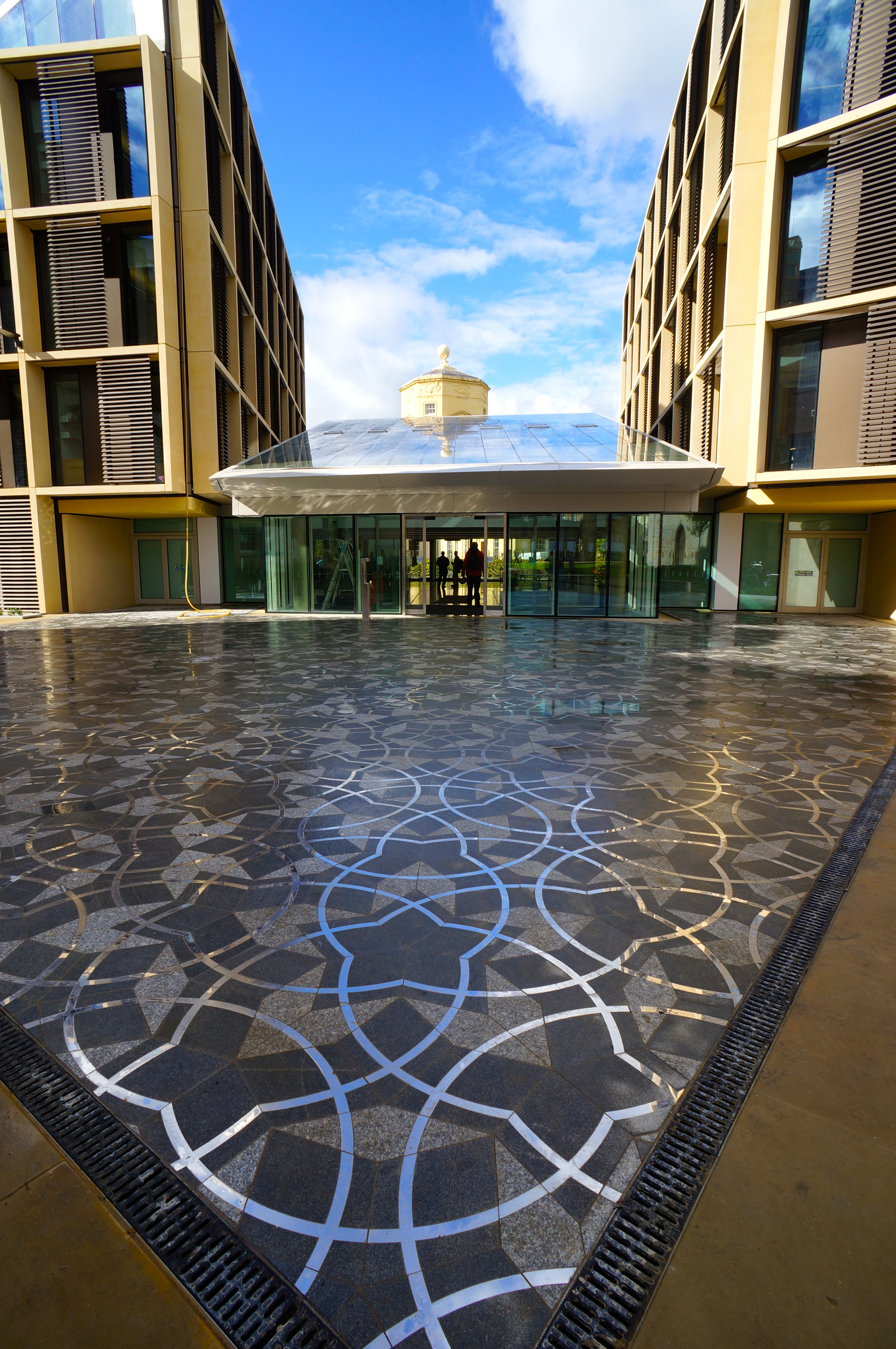
Mathematical Institute with Penrose tiling and a glimpse of the Radcliffe Observatory

- 2006
  - 5 May: Official inauguration of Oxford Castle quarter (the former prison, closed 1996) as a mixed-use heritage, hotel and restaurant complex.
  - Oxford Office Village in Langford Lane, Kidlington is completed.
- 2007
  - January: The Radcliffe Infirmary closes, hospital facilities having transferred to the John Radcliffe Hospital and other locations in the city, and the site is handed over to the University of Oxford for development as the Radcliffe Observatory Quarter.
  - 2 July: North Wall Arts Centre, designed by Haworth Tompkins on the site of a Victorian swimming pool in the grounds of St Edward's School in South Parade, Summertown, is opened to the public.
  - July: Severe flooding. 105.5 mm of rain falls in Oxford this month.
- 2008
  - 1 June: Jamie Oliver opens the first of his Jamie's Italian restaurant chain, in George Street; it closes in 2019.
  - June: Greyfriars ceases to be a Permanent Private Hall of the University of Oxford; students transfer to Regent's Park College.
  - September: The Oxford Academy opens as a secondary school on the site of the failing Peers School in Littlemore.
  - 1 October: Green Templeton College formed by merger of Green and Templeton Colleges.
  - October: St Hilda's, the last female-only college in the University of Oxford (since Somerville admitted men in 1994), starts to admit male undergraduates.
- 2009
  - St Bede's Hall opens as a Catholic college at 42 St Giles' but survives only for a year.
  - May: Oxford Fashion Week launched.
  - 7 November: Ashmolean Museum reopens to the public after major reconstruction by architect Rick Mather.
- 2010
  - Spring: ECB Oxford University Centre of Cricketing Excellence (established in 2000 in The Parks) is renamed Oxford Marylebone Cricket Club University (MCCU).
  - Indie rock band Glass Animals forms.
- 2011
  - January: Oxford Spires Academy opens.
  - 5 July: The Bodleian Library opens its "Gladstone Link" to readers, the former underground bookstore beneath Radcliffe Square linked with both the old library and the Radcliffe Camera.
- 2012
  - September: Blavatnik School of Government in the University of Oxford (established 2010) takes its first students.
  - 10 October: Ertegun House officially opens in St Giles' as a centre attached to the University of Oxford providing an international graduate scholarship programme in the humanities.
  - 28 October: Ruskin College officially reopens on its new site in Old Headington.
- 2013
  - 23 April: Pembroke College opens its Rokos Quad with a glass-sided footbridge over Brewer Street.
  - Spring: Controversial graduate student housing at Castle Mill completed for the University of Oxford.
  - May: Oxford child sex abuse ring, having operated since 2006, is convicted.
  - Michaelmas: Andrew Wiles building for Mathematical Institute, University of Oxford opened in Radcliffe Observatory Quarter.
  - November: Oxford & Cherwell Valley College renamed City of Oxford College.
- 2014
  - 14 February: Community radio station First FM launches as Destiny 105 (replacing the previously licensed station OX105), operating from new studios in east Oxford using largely open-source software.
  - 26 February: Oxford Brookes University's John Henry Brookes Building opened.
  - March: First woman appointed as director of a University of Oxford museum, Silke Ackermann at the Museum of the History of Science.
  - May: Harris Manchester College's Siew-Sngiem Clock Tower and Sukum Navapan Gate completed.
  - 20 June: Christ Church opens the Jubilee Bridge, a footbridge over the Cherwell in Christ Church Meadow.
  - 29 September: The New Bodleian Library building reopens to readers of rare books and manuscripts after major reconstruction as the Weston Library by WilkinsonEyre.
  - October: St Benet's Hall admits its first women students, as graduates.
- 2015
  - 11 April: The Boat Races 2015, the first occasion when the women's and men's races are rowed on the same course (in London) on the same day; the Oxford crews win both.
  - 26 October: Oxford Parkway railway station officially opened, giving rail passengers an alternative route from the city to London (Marylebone).
  - 10 November: The Bodleian Library acquires its twelve millionth book, a unique copy of Shelley's subversive Poetical Essay on the Existing State of Things "By a Gentleman of the University of Oxford" printed in Oxford in 1811 while the poet was an undergraduate.
  - 30 November: Blavatnik School of Government in the University of Oxford begins to move into its new Radcliffe Observatory Quarter building in Walton Street (designed by Herzog & de Meuron).
- 2016
  - 12 January: Induction of the first female Vice-Chancellor of the University of Oxford, Louise Richardson, an Irish-born Catholic, she having taken office on 4 January.
  - From January: Oxford Centre for Islamic Studies plans staged full occupation of its new premises on Marston Road, 13 years after the beginning of work on the site.
  - 7 May: Oxford United F.C. wins promotion to Football League One.
  - October: St Benet's Hall admits its first women undergraduates (resident in Norham Gardens), ending single-sex education in the University of Oxford.
- 2017
  - 14 February: An explosion destroys a 3-storey block of flats at Osney with one fatality.
  - 18–19 March: Exeter College's Cohen Quad, on Ruskin College's former Walton Street site (designed by Alison Brooks Architects), is formally opened (occupied from 8 January).
  - 29–30 March: 17 men arrested in connection with an Oxford child sex abuse ring; 8 are convicted in February–March 2018.
  - 18 October: Worcester College opens the Sultan Nazrin Shah Centre.
  - 24 October: Opening of new Westgate shopping centre (Curzon Cinema opens 1 December; refurbished Oxford Central Library opens as Oxfordshire County Library 18 December, officially 22 February 2018).
- 2018
  - 23–28 March: Peking University HSBC Business School opens a campus at Boars Hill.
  - 10 May: Agreement signed for the city to be twinned with Padua in Italy (formalised 11 April 2019).
  - 20 August: The University of Oxford proposes creation of at least one new graduate college in its draft 5-year development plan.
  - October: Keble College begins occupation of its H. B. Allen Building, graduate accommodation (designed by Rick Mather) on the site of the former Acland Hospital (official opening 3 October 2019).
  - 5 October: City twinned with Wrocław in Poland.
- 2019
  - 11 March: City twinned with Ramallah in Palestine and formally with Padua.
  - 7 May: The University of Oxford establishes Reuben College (known until 2020 as Parks College), an interdisciplinary graduate society, which will partly share the premises of the Radcliffe Science Library. The first fellows are appointed this year and the first student intake is in the 2021–2022 academic year.
  - 19 June: The University of Oxford announces receipt of its largest-ever donation, of £150M from American private equity company founder Stephen A. Schwarzman, intended to fund a new Institute for Ethics in Artificial Intelligence within a Stephen A. Schwarzman Centre for the Humanities in the Radcliffe Observatory Quarter, also including community performance and exhibition spaces.
- 2020
  - March: COVID-19 pandemic reaches Oxford. On 31 October the city moves to the tier 2 level of restrictions and on 26 December Oxfordshire goes up to tier 4 under the "all tiers regulations".
  - 30 December: The COVID-19 vaccine AZD1222, designed in January and developed by the University of Oxford's Jenner Institute and Oxford Vaccine Group in conjunction with AstraZeneca, is approved for use in the COVID-19 vaccination programme in the United Kingdom.
- 2021
  - 3 August: Ruskin College announces that it is becoming part of the University of West London.
  - 27 August: Closure of Oxuniprint, the last printing operation of Oxford University Press.
  - 1 November: Linacre College announces its intention to change its name to Thao College in recognition of a major benefaction.
- 2022
  - 28 February
    - Oxford zero emission zone launched by Oxfordshire County Council.
    - Announcement confirming that national bookshop chain Waterstones is acquiring Blackwell's.
  - 28 May: University of Oxford announces launch of a Pandemic Sciences Institute.
  - Autumn: Jesus College completes its Northgate development in Cornmarket and Market Streets.
- 2023
  - 11 April: Long-term closure of the Botley Road at the railway bridge by Network Rail.
  - 2 October: A malaria vaccine with 77% efficacy capable of cheap bulk production, R21/Matrix-M, developed by the University of Oxford's Jenner Institute and partners, is approved by the World Health Organization.
  - 16–17 October: The Radcliffe Science Library reopens in its refurbished premises, now shared with Reuben College.
- 2026 – 10 July: Royal opening of the University of Oxford's Stephen A. Schwarzman Centre for the Humanities in the Radcliffe Observatory Quarter, including community performance and exhibition spaces.
- 2028 – April (projected): Oxford is incorporated into a unitary authority, Greater Oxford.

== Births ==
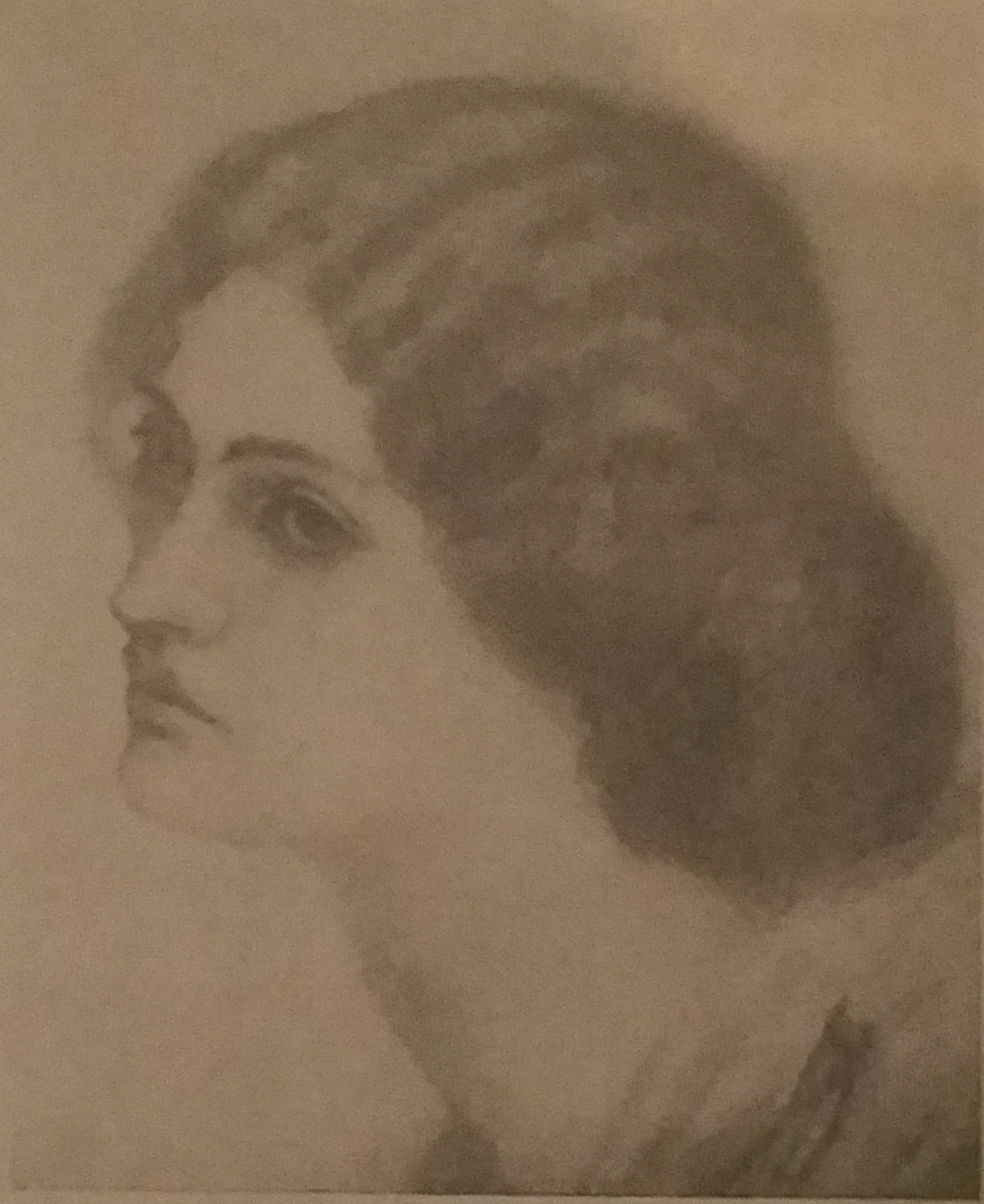
Jane Burden sketched by William Morris

- 1157 – 8 September: Richard I of England (died 1199)
- 1166 – 24 December: John, King of England (died 1216)
- c.1477 – Lambert Simnel, pretender to the English throne (probable birthplace; died c. 1525)
- c.1517 – Thomas Cooper, Bishop of Winchester, lexicographer, controversialist and physician (died 1594)
- 1522/23 – John Piers, Archbishop of York (died 1594)
- c.1560 – Thomas Harriot, polymath (died 1621)
- c.1562 – Nicholas Owen, carpenter and Jesuit lay brother (martyred 1606)
- 1583 – 25 December (bapt.): Orlando Gibbons, composer (died 1625)
- 1602
  - 12 October: William Chillingworth, religious controversialist (died 1644)
  - Approximate date: Henry Marten, lawyer, radical politician, soldier and regicide (died 1680)
- 1606 – 3 March (bapt.): William Davenant, dramatist (died 1668)
- 1632 – 17 December: Anthony Wood, antiquary (died 1695)
- 1651/2 – William Turner, composer and countertenor (probable birthplace; died 1740)
- 1665 – 28 December: George FitzRoy, 1st Duke of Northumberland, an illegitimate son of Charles II (died 1716)
- 1668 – 5 January (bapt.): Alicia D'Anvers, née Clarke, poet (died 1725)
- 1734 – William Buckland, architect in colonial America (died 1774)
- 1753 – 27 February (bapt.): James Sadler, balloonist (died 1828)
- 1758 – 28 October: John Sibthorp, botanist (died 1796)
- 1787 – Eliza Salmon, née Munday, soprano (died 1849)
- 1826 – 17 December: Frank Buckland, natural historian (died 1880)
- 1831 – 12 January: Philip Webb, Arts and Crafts architect (died 1915)
- 1837 – 12 December: J. R. Green, historian (died 1883)
- 1839 – 19 October: Jane Morris, née Burden, artists' model (died 1914)
- 1842 – 14 May: Henry Taunt, topographical photographer (died 1922)
- 1845 – 8 December: Herbert Giles, sinologist (died 1935)
- 1847 – 1 April: Hamilton Hamilton, painter in the United States (died 1928)
- 1849 – 26 June: Sarah Angelina Acland, pioneer colour photographer (died 1930)
- 1856 – 15 February: Annie Mary Anne Henley Rogers, pioneer of higher education for women (died in accident 1937)
- 1861 – 25 April: Gertrude Tuckwell, trade unionist (died 1951)
- 1873 – 8 May: Nevil Sidgwick, theoretical chemist (died 1952)
- 1884 – 9 November: Christopher Chavasse, Bishop of Rochester (died 1962) & his twin brother Noel Godfrey Chavasse, surgeon, twice winner of the Victoria Cross (died of wounds 1917)
- 1888 – 25 December: Michael Sadleir, né Sadler, novelist (died 1957)
- 1889
  - 29 May: Basil Blackwell, bookseller and publisher (died 1984)
  - 12 September: Ronald Poulton, rugby union footballer (killed in action 1915)
- 1892 – 5 November: J. B. S. Haldane, polymath (died 1964)
- 1893
  - 13 June: Dorothy L. Sayers, author (died 1957)
  - 21 December: Winifred Nicholson, née Rosa Roberts, impressionist painter (died 1981)
  - 23 December: Sholto Douglas, Marshal of the Royal Air Force (died 1969)
- 1901 – 21 April: Gladys Mitchell, writer of detective fiction (died 1983)
- 1903
  - 22 January: Robin Milford, classical composer (died 1959)
  - 12 May: Lennox Berkeley, classical composer (died 1989)
- 1910 – 3 April: Thomas Hodgkin, Marxist historian of Africa (died 1982)
- 1911 – 4 October: C. L. Mowat, historian (died 1970)
- 1915 – 26 August: Humphrey Searle, classical composer (died 1982)
- 1917 – 24 March: John Kendrew, biochemist, winner of the Nobel Prize in Chemistry (died 1997)
- 1918 – 17 February: Olive Gibbs, née Cox, Labour politician, peace campaigner and twice mayor of Oxford (died 1995)
- 1920 – 3 August: P. D. James, writer of detective fiction (died 2014)
- 1924
  - 3 February: E. P. Thompson, Marxist historian (died 1993)
  - 14 May: Tristram Cary, electronic composer (died 2008 in Australia)
- 1927 – 30 March: Robert Armstrong, civil servant (died 2020)
- 1928 – 12 November: Maureen Gardner, Olympic hurdler (died 1974)
- 1929 – 22 June: Humphry Bowen, chemist and botanist (died 2001)
- 1934 – 16 March: Roger Norrington, orchestral conductor (died 2025)
- 1937 – 17 February: Benjamin Whitrow, actor (died 2017)
- 1938 – 12 September: Patrick Mower, né Shaw, television actor
- 1940
  - 21 August: Dominick Harrod, broadcast economic journalist (died 2013)
  - 27 December: Toni Arthur, née Antoinette Wilson, folk singer and children's television presenter
- 1941
  - 18 May: Miriam Margolyes, character actress
  - 30 August: Sue MacGregor, broadcaster
- 1942
  - 7 January: Will Wyatt, chief executive, BBC broadcasting
  - 8 January: Stephen Hawking, theoretical physicist and cosmologist (died 2018)
  - 24 February: David Sherwin, screenwriter (died 2018)
- 1943
  - 21 March: Viv Stanshall, musician (died 1995)
  - 28 August: Simon LeVay, neuroscientist
- 1944
  - 12 April: Lisa Jardine, née Bronowski, Renaissance historian and polymath (died 2015)
  - 14 April: John Sergeant, television journalist
- 1945
  - 26 January: Jacqueline du Pré, cellist (died 1987)
  - 2 June: Lord David Dundas, rock singer and screen composer
- 1946 – 29 April: Humphrey Carpenter, biographer (died 2005)
- 1947 – 10 September: David Pountney, opera director
- 1949 – 25 August: Martin Amis, novelist (died 2023)
- 1950 – 2 January: Angela Gallop, née Knowles, forensic scientist
- 1956 – 14 March: Jonathan Bowen, computer scientist
- 1958 – 11 July: Mark Lester, child actor
- 1959
  - 11 June: Hugh Laurie, actor
  - 9 November: Frances O'Grady, trade unionist
- 1960 – 16 October: Cressida Dick, police officer, Commissioner of Police of the Metropolis
- 1961 – 7 August: Walter Swinburn, flat racing jockey and trainer (died 2016)
- 1962 – Ray Harrison Graham, dramatist and director
- 1964 – 29 October: Yasmin Le Bon, née Parvaneh, model
- 1965 – 20 January: Sophie, Duchess of Edinburgh, née Rhys-Jones, member of the royal family
- 1966
  - 24 July: Martin Keown, footballer
  - 30 October: Irene Tracey, neuroscientist and vice-chancellor of the University of Oxford
- 1972 – Zinnie Harris, dramatist
- 1975
  - 26 July: Liz Truss, Prime Minister of the UK in 2022
  - 31 August: Daniel Harding, orchestral conductor
- 1976 – 1 April: David Oyelowo, actor
- 1979 – 11 September: Ting-Ting Hu, film actress
- 1981 – Jesse Darling, sculptor and installation artist
- 1983 – 21 April: Gugu Mbatha-Raw, television actress
- 1987 – 6 March: Hannah England, middle-distance runner
- 1996 – 3 January: Florence Pugh, actress

== Deaths ==
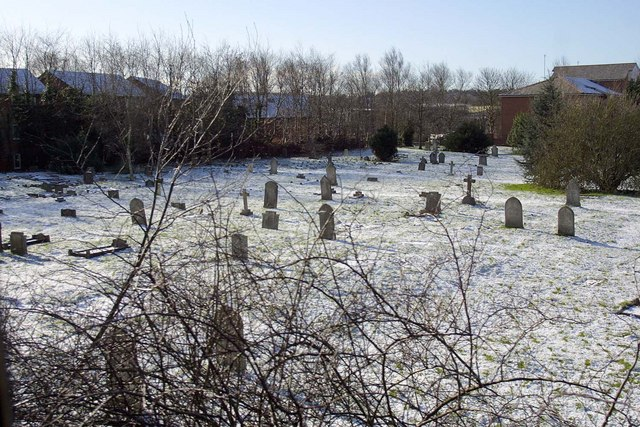
Osney Cemetery (on the site of the Abbey)

- 727 – 19 October: Frideswide, abbess (b. c.650)
- 924 – 2 August: Ælfweard of Wessex, royal prince (b. c.902)
- 1002 – 13 November: Gunhilde, Viking noblewoman
- 1040 – 17 March: Harold Harefoot, king of England (b. c.1015)
- 1151 – Walter of Oxford, archdeacon
- 1176 – Rosamund Clifford, royal mistress
- 1222 – 17 April: Robert of Reading (Haggai), convert to Judaism, executed
- 1236 – 7 May: Agnellus of Pisa, Franciscan friar (b. 1195)
- 1292 – June?: Roger Bacon, friar, philosopher and scientist (b. c.1214)
- 1553 – 15 February: Catherine Vermigli, ex-nun
- 1610 – 9 November: George Napper, Catholic priest, executed (b. 1550)
- 1644
  - 5 February: Sir Thomas Byron, Royalist commander (b. c.1610)
  - 4 July: Brian Twyne, antiquary (b. 1581)
- 1648 – 28 May (bur.): William Percy, poet and playwright (b. 1570/4)
- 1680 – 4 February: Jacob Bobart the Elder, botanist (b. 1599 in Brunswick)
- 1686 – 10 July: John Fell, Bishop of Oxford (b. 1625)
- 1703 – 28 October: John Wallis, mathematician (b. 1616)
- 1709 – 30 June: Edward Lhuyd, Welsh natural historian and antiquary (b. 1660)
- 1747 – 2 April: Johann Jacob Dillenius, botanist (b. 1684 in Darmstadt)
- 1773 – 10 June: Thomas Hearne, antiquary (b. 1678)
- 1790 – 21 May: Thomas Warton, poet laureate (b. 1728)
- 1854 – 22 December: Martin Routh, classicist and president of Magdalen College (b. 1755)
- 1862 – 7 August: William Turner, topographical watercolourist (b. 1789)
- 1882 – 16 September: E. B. Pusey, high churchman (b. 1800)
- 1893 – 1 October: Benjamin Jowett, theologian, Master of Balliol and academic reformer (b. 1817)
- 1894 – 30 July: Walter Pater, art critic (b. 1839)
- 1896 – 8 February: Charles Umpherston Aitchison, colonial governor (b. 1832 in Edinburgh)
- 1899 – 6 October: Felicia Skene, writer and prison reformer (b. 1821 in Aix-en-Provence)
- 1900
  - 16 October: Sir Henry Acland, academic physician (b. 1815)
  - 28 October: Max Müller, orientalist (b. 1823 in Dessau)
- 1901 – 31 March: Sir John Stainer, organist, composer and professor of music (died on holiday in Verona; burial 6 April at Holywell Cemetery) (b. 1840)
- 1912 – 30 April: Henry Sweet, philologist (b. 1845)
- 1919
  - 8 April: Sir Thomas Chapman, 7th Baronet, Anglo-Irish landowner, father of T. E. Lawrence (b. 1846)
  - 29 December: Sir William Osler, hospital physician, "father of modern medicine" (b. 1849 in Ontario)
- 1920 – 5 June: Rhoda Broughton, popular novelist (b. 1840)
- 1930
  - 21 April: Robert Bridges, poet laureate (b. 1844)
  - 2 December: Sarah Angelina Acland, pioneer colour photographer (b. 1849)
- 1932 – 29 February: George Claridge Druce, botanist, pharmacist and mayor of Oxford (b. 1850)
- 1934 – 14 March: Francis Llewellyn Griffith, Egyptologist (b. 1862)
- 1936 – 19 March: Eleanor Constance Lodge, promoter of women's higher education (b. 1869)
- 1941
  - 16 January: A. G. Macdonell, writer (b. 1895)
  - 11 July: Sir Arthur Evans, archaeologist of Minoan civilisation (b. 1851)
- 1942 – 14 December: Leonie Zuntz, Hittitologist, suicide (b. 1908 in Germany)
- 1943 – 14 October: Michael Sadler, educationalist and Master of University College (b. 1861)
- 1944 – 26 June: Edward Brooks, soldier, winner of the Victoria Cross (b. 1883)
- 1945 – 15 May: Charles Williams, writer (b. 1886)
- 1946 – 20 February: Hugh Allen, conductor, died of effects of road accident (b. 1869)
- 1952
  - 18 July: Sir Hugh Cairns, neurosurgeon (b. 1896 in Australia)
  - 27 November: Franz Baermann Steiner, anthropologist (b. 1909 in Prague)
- 1954 – 8 June: Kenneth Kirk, Bishop of Oxford and moral theologian (b. 1886)
- 1955 – 31 March: Thomas Dunbabin, classical archaeologist and resistance leader (b. 1911 in Australia)
- 1956 – 27 September: Gerald Finzi, composer (b. 1901)
- 1957
  - 3 July: Frederick Lindemann, 1st Viscount Cherwell, physicist (b. 1886 in Baden-Baden)
  - 27 October: Paul Jacobsthal, archaeologist (b. 1880 in Berlin)
- 1963
  - 16 March: William Beveridge, social scientist and Master of University College (b. 1963)
  - 22 November: C. S. Lewis, author (b. 1898 in Belfast)
- 1971 – 4 July: Sir Maurice Bowra, classicist, Warden of Wadham College and wit (b. 1898)
- 1972 – 13 November: Arnold Strode-Jackson, Olympic middle-distance runner, British Army officer and lawyer (b. 1891)
- 1975
  - 18 May: Christopher Strachey, computer scientist (b. 1916)
  - 29 September: John Henry Brookes, educator (b. 1891)
- 1980 – 19 November: Edmund Bowen, physical chemist (b. 1898)
- 1981 – 22 November: Sir Hans Krebs, biochemist (b. 1900 in Hildesheim)
- 1982 – 20 November: John Redcliffe-Maud, civil servant and Master of University College (b. 1906)
- 1985 – 13 April: Oscar Nemon, sculptor (b. 1906 in Osijek)
- 1988
  - 10 March: Andy Gibb, pop singer-songwriter (b. 1958)
  - 21 December: Nikolaas Tinbergen, animal behaviourist (b. 1907 in The Hague)
- 1992 – 24 January: John Sparrow, literary scholar and Warden of All Souls (b. 1906)
- 1994 – 24 May: John Wain, poet, novelist and critic (b. 1925)
- 1997 – 5 November: Sir Isaiah Berlin, philosopher and president of Wolfson College (b. 1909 in Riga)
- 1999
  - 27 March: Michael Aris, orientalist (b. 1946)
  - 30 May: Sonia Chadwick Hawkes, Anglo-Saxon archaeologist (b. 1933)
- 2001 – 15 October: Anne Ridler, poet (b. 1912)
- 2005 – 24 July: Sir Richard Doll, epidemiologist (b. 1912)
- 2006 – 31 January: Moira Shearer, ballerina (b. 1926)
- 2007 – 21 August: Siobhan Dowd, children's novelist (b. 1960)
- 2011 – 18 January: John Herivel, cryptanalyst (b. 1918)
- 2014 – 14 October: A. H. Halsey, sociologist (b. 1923)
- 2017
  - 21 March: Colin Dexter, detective fiction writer (b. 1930)
  - 19 August: Brian Aldiss, science fiction writer (b. 1925)
- 2018 – 3 March: Sir Roger Bannister, mile runner, neurologist and Master of Pembroke College (b. 1929)
- 2024 – 11 April: Paddy Summerfield, photographer (b. 1947)

== See also ==
- History of Oxford
- Timelines of other cities in South East England: Portsmouth, Reading, Southampton
