= George Street, Oxford =

Street in central Oxford, England

George Street
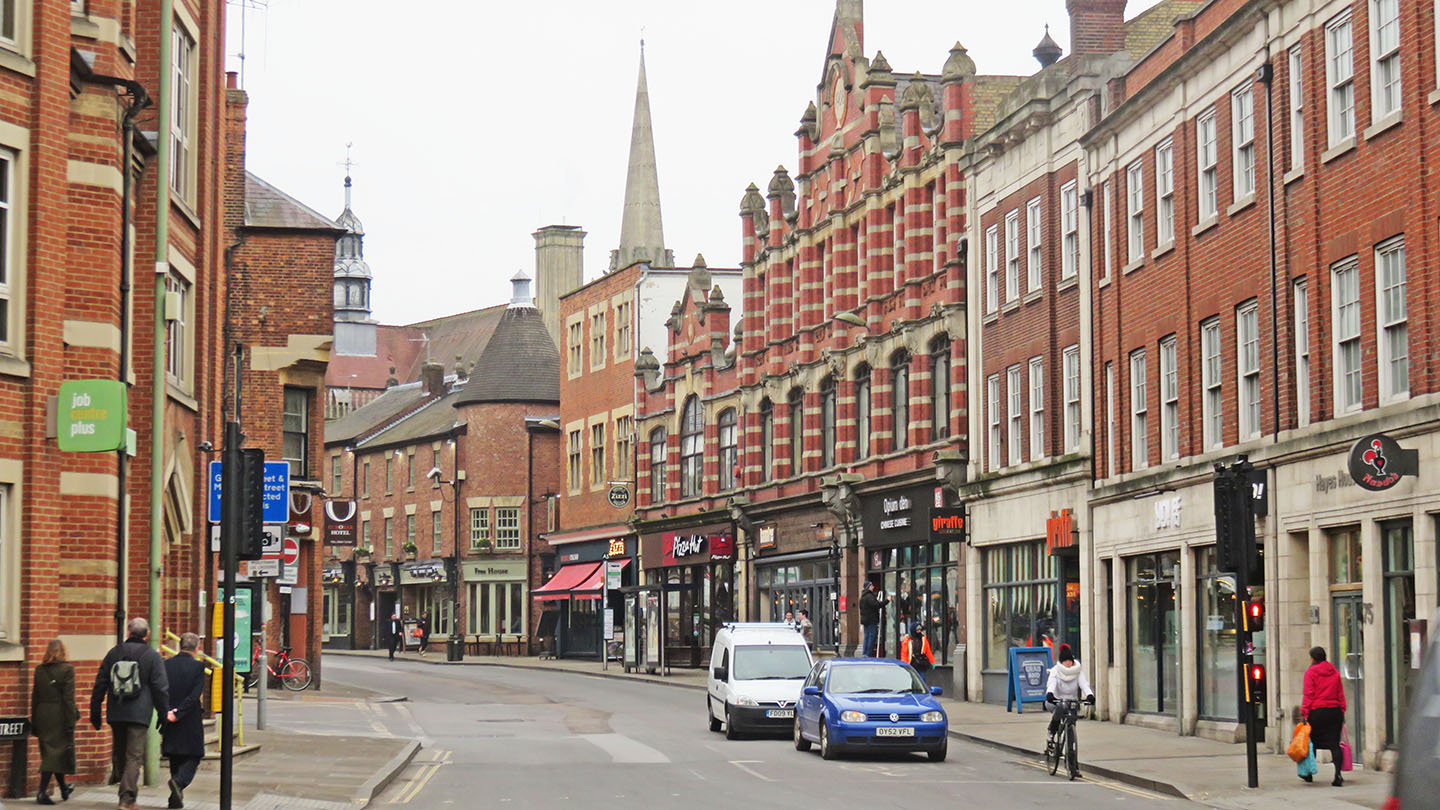
- View of George Street from the Worcester Street junction looking east
- Interactive map of George Street
- Length: 0.2 mi (0.32 km)
- Location: Oxford, England
- Postal code: OX1 2
- Coordinates: 51.7535°N 1.2617°W
- east end: 51.7540°N 1.2589°W
- west end: 51.7536°N 1.2634°W

George Street is a street in central Oxford, England. It is a shopping street running east–west.

== Overview ==
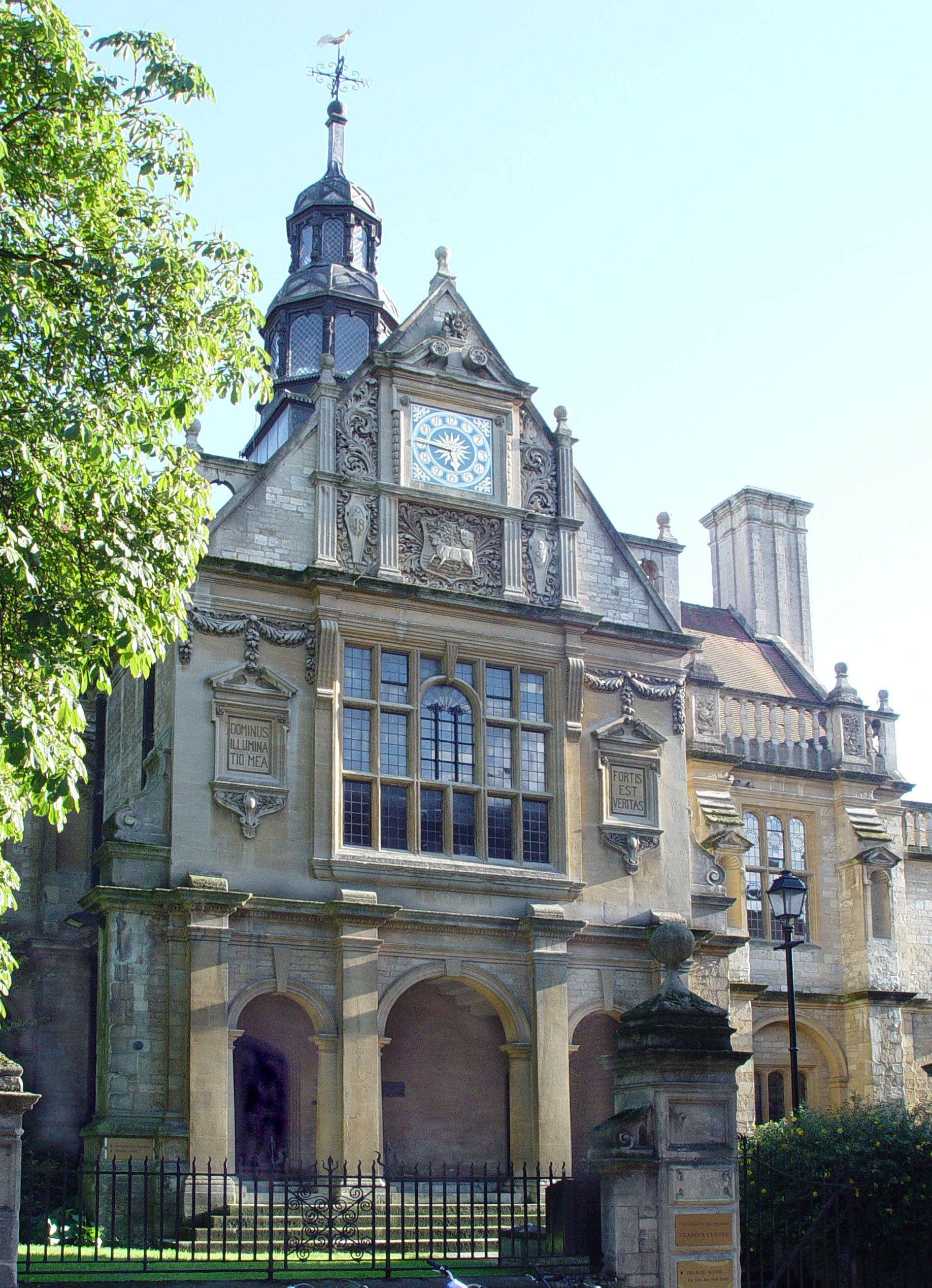
The former City of Oxford High School for Boys in George Street

George Street runs east–west through central Oxford. Its eastern end reaches Broad Street at a crossroads that also connects with Cornmarket Street to the south and Magdalen Street to the north. At its western extremity, the street meets Hythe Bridge Street, forming a junction with Worcester Street.

The New Theatre Oxford—the city’s principal commercial theatre—is situated on the north side of the street. For a period it operated under the name Apollo Theatre, before reverting to its earlier designation. Nearby, the Burton Taylor Studio is located in Gloucester Street, which branches off to the north. Number 40 on the same side of George Street houses Arts at the Old Fire Station.

Gloucester Green bus station lies just to the north of the western end of George Street. Bus services operating from this station include those of the Oxford Bus Company and Stagecoach in Oxfordshire.

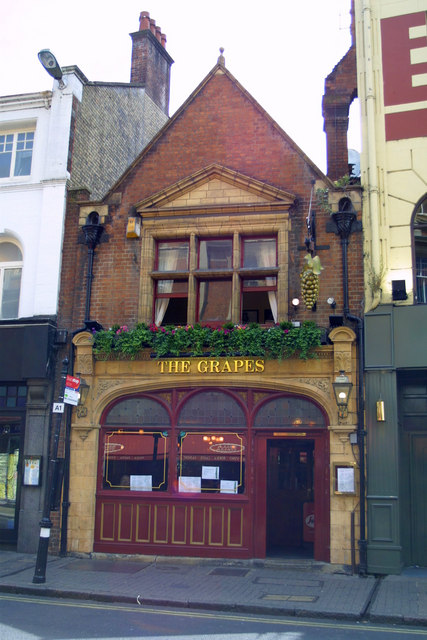
The Grapes public house on George Street.

== History ==
George Street is outside the formerly walled section of Oxford, running parallel with the medieval wall. Buildings on the south side of the street occupy plots that were formerly part of the defensive ditch outside the wall.

The former City of Oxford High School for Boys building on the south side of the street was designed by T. G. Jackson and built in 1880-81. In 1966, the school moved to the Southfields Grammar School site and its former building became the University of Oxford Classics Department. Since 2007, the building has housed the University's Faculty of History.

W.F. Lucas' ready-to-wear clothing factory on the south side of the street was designed by Harry Drinkwater and built by local contractor T. H. Kingerlee in 1892. As a factory, 300 employees worked on the site. It is now divided into multiple retail and office premises.

The brick buildings of the former fire station and Corn Exchange on the north side of the street were designed by H.W. Moore and built in 1894. By 1974, the fire station had moved to Rewley Road and its former building had been converted to a community arts centre (Arts at the Old Fire Station) run by the charity Oxford Area Arts Council and used occasionally by Anvil Productions, the Oxford Playhouse Company, for rehearsals.

The present New Theatre was built in 1933. It is the third New Theatre on the site, replacing successive buildings completed in 1836 and 1886.

The Ritz Cinema on the north side of George Street was built in 1936. From 2000 to 2025, the building was occupied by an Odeon cinema.

== Sources ==
- Sherwood, Jennifer; Pevsner, Nikolaus (1974). Oxfordshire. The Buildings of England. Harmondsworth: Penguin Books. pp. 303, 324. ISBN 0-14-071045-0.
- Woolley, Liz (2010). "Industrial Architecture in Oxford, 1870 to 1914". Oxoniensia. LXXV. Oxfordshire Architectural and Historical Society: 88. ISSN 0308-5562.
