= Farndon =

Farndon is the name of more than one place in England:

- Farndon, Cheshire
- Farndon, Nottinghamshire
- In Northamptonshire:
  - East Farndon
  - West Farndon
- Fictional village in Nevil Shute's novel No Highway

== See also ==
- Farndon Road, Oxford
