= New Theatre Oxford =

Theatre in Oxford, England

Coordinates: 51.753917°N 1.260107°W

- Interactive map of New Theatre Oxford
- Former names: Apollo Theatre Oxford (1977–2003)
- Address: George Street; Oxford; England, UK
- Owner: ATG Entertainment
- Capacity: 1,785

Construction
- Opened: 26 February 1934

Website
- Official box office

New Theatre Oxford (formerly the Apollo Theatre Oxford and the Apollo, from 1977 to 2003) is a commercial theatre located on George Street in Oxford, England. It has a capacity of about 1,785.

== History ==
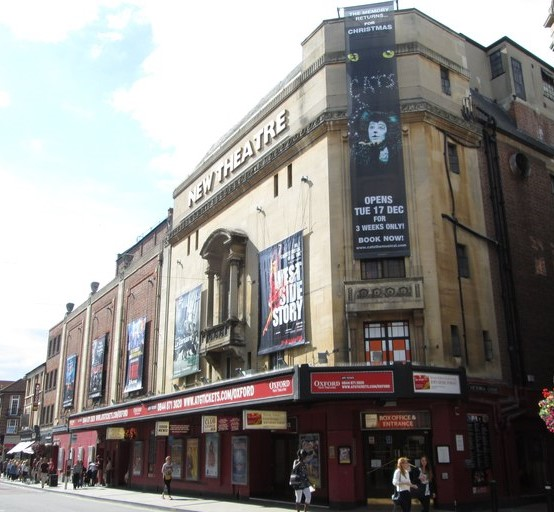
The New Theatre on George Street, Oxford, 2013

The first "New Theatre" on this site opened in 1836, presenting music hall entertainment. It was replaced in 1886 by a new building, which served as the venue for the Oxford University Dramatic Society. The theatre was damaged by a fire in 1892 and enlarged in 1908. It was managed by the Dorrill family until 1972.

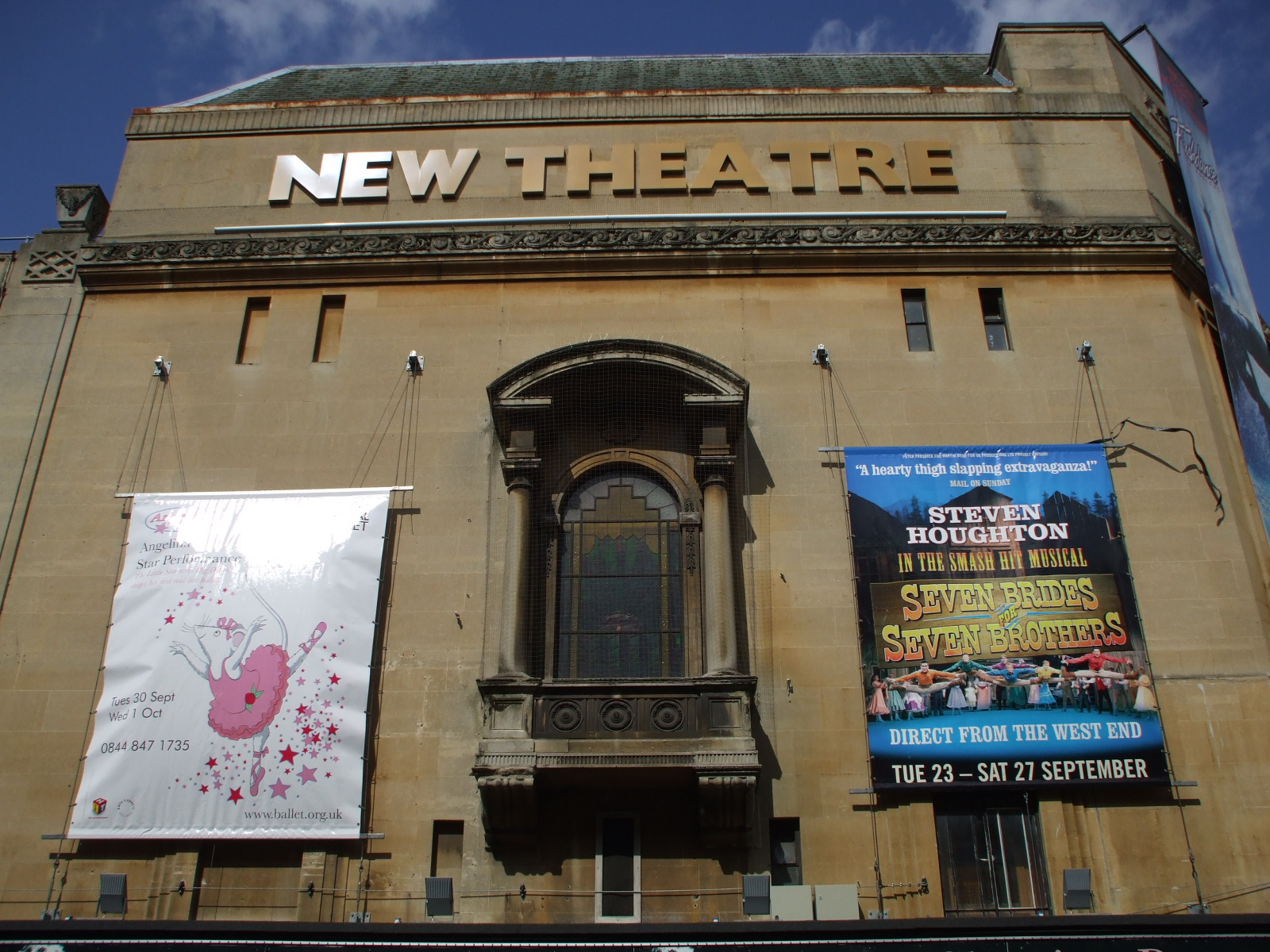
The New Theatre's facade, 2008

The present building dates from 1933, and was designed by the Milburn Brothers with an interior in Art Deco style by T. P. Bennett and Sons. The original colour scheme featured shades of deep brown with gilt friezes, but in later years (circa 1980), a multicoloured scheme was introduced.

A theatre has stood on the corner of George Street since 1836. The first, built that year, was commonly known as the "Vic" and then later as the "Theatre Royale", taking its name from the company that performed there. Barred from staging plays during university terms, its lessee turned instead to concerts and music-hall entertainments, and by 1880 the building had fallen into disrepair.

At the instigation of members of the local community and individuals associated with the University of Oxford, a company was formed to raise funds for a theatre that would be available to university and town players as well as professionals. In February 1886, the Oxford University Dramatic Society opened the second New Theatre with Shakespeare's Twelfth Night. It was designed by Harry Drinkwater, and had seating for about 1,000 spectators. The second New Theatre was damaged by a fire in 1892 and renovated in 1908, increasing its capacity to 1,200.

Charles Dorrill started work in the box office when the first New Theatre opened in 1886. He advanced through the ranks to become assistant manager and, in 1908, he became the manager when the Dorrill family took over the venue. The Dorrills would run the theatre as a family business for the next 64 years. Charles Dorrill died suddenly in 1912. His son Stanley, who was working at Blackwell's, the Oxford booksellers, was asked to take over. Stanley was only 18 at the time, and his tenure would last 47 years. In 1933, Dorrill stated his intention to build "the most luxurious and comfortable house of entertainment in England" and commissioned a new building from theatre architects William and T. R. Milburn of Sunderland. The Milburns collaborated on an art deco interior with T. P. Bennett and Sons (who had designed the Saville Theatre in London). The Milburns' theatre oeuvre included the Sunderland Empire Theatre and London's Dominion Theatre.

The third New Theatre re-opened in February 1934 with a formal speech by Miss Tawney and included a revolving stage (mechanism extant) and an increased capacity of about 2000 (1710 seated). During the Second World War, approximately half a million troops had free entertainment at the New Theatre, earning Stanley Dorrill an MBE. The theatre published a weekly eight-page program, which was typeset at local publisher Alden Press.

The New Theatre's annual pantomimes (incorporating Vera Legge's Dancers) attracted many star names and became an Oxford family Christmas tradition. In 1963/4 Yana (Pamela Guard) starred in Cinderella with Des O'Connor as Buttons, Danny La Rue and Alan Hayes as The Ugly Sisters, and Erica Yorke as Prince Charming, alongside Jack Douglas, George Arnett, and Wendy Cameron. The following year, 1964/5, Billy Fury starred in Aladdin, appearing with his band The Gamblers alongside Ray Fell and Laurie Lupino Lane. Freddie Garrity played Wishee Washee opposite Lulu in Aladdin in 1976, returning in the 1980s to play Jack in Jack and the Beanstalk with Anne Charleston, Alvin Stardust, and Lynsey de Paul. Peter Noone of Herman's Hermits performed in pantomime at the New Theatre in the early 1970s, together with Peter Glaze as the Dame. 1978 saw Norman Collier take to the pantomime stage in George Street.

In 1955, Stanley Dorrill became managing director. His son John Dorrill took over the day-to-day management of the theatre, having served an apprenticeship in London's West End. John married Erica Yorke, who appeared as the principal boy in many New Theatre Christmas pantomimes.

By the mid-1960s, the New Theatre began to struggle. John Dorrill took over as managing director from his father in 1965 and planned to redevelop the site into shops and offices with two smaller theatres, but Oxford City Council rejected the idea.

Eventually, musicals and play productions were supplemented by pop and rock concerts. Finally, in 1972, Howard and Wyndham's provincial theatre chain group took over, bringing the Dorrill family's ownership to an end.

In 1977, Apollo Leisure took over the lease of the theatre and renamed it The Apollo. Apollo Leisure was bought out by SFX in 1999, followed by Clear Channel Entertainment in 2001. After a refurbishment in 2003, the theatre reverted to its original name of the New Theatre, with Clear Channel Entertainment's theatre division becoming Live Nation two years later. The Ambassador Theatre Group bought the theatre in 2009.

== See also ==
- Old Fire Station Theatre, also on George Street
- Oxford Playhouse
