= The Vines, Oxford =

House in England

Coordinates: 51.7595°N 1.2272°W

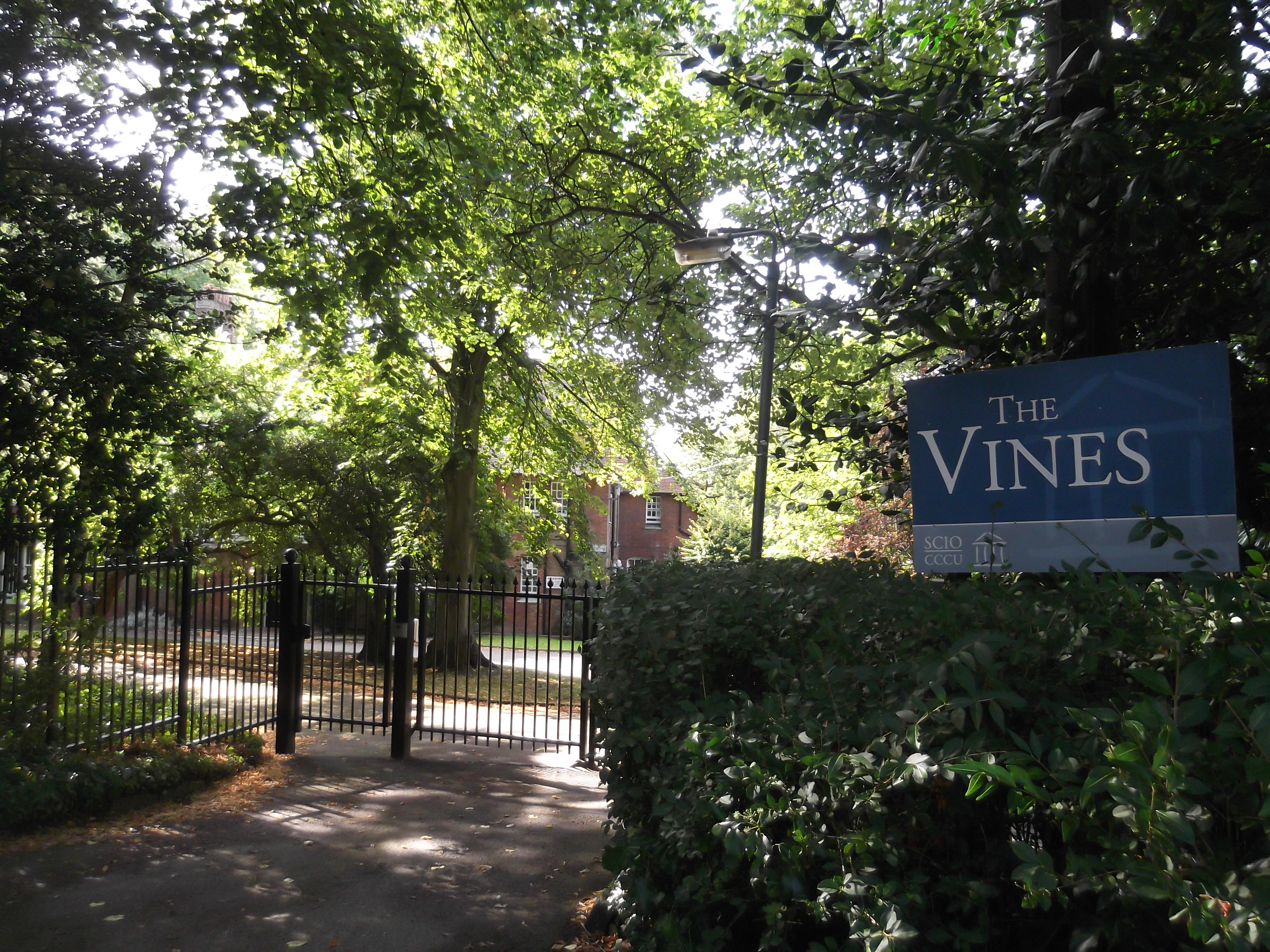
View through the main gate on Pullens Lane

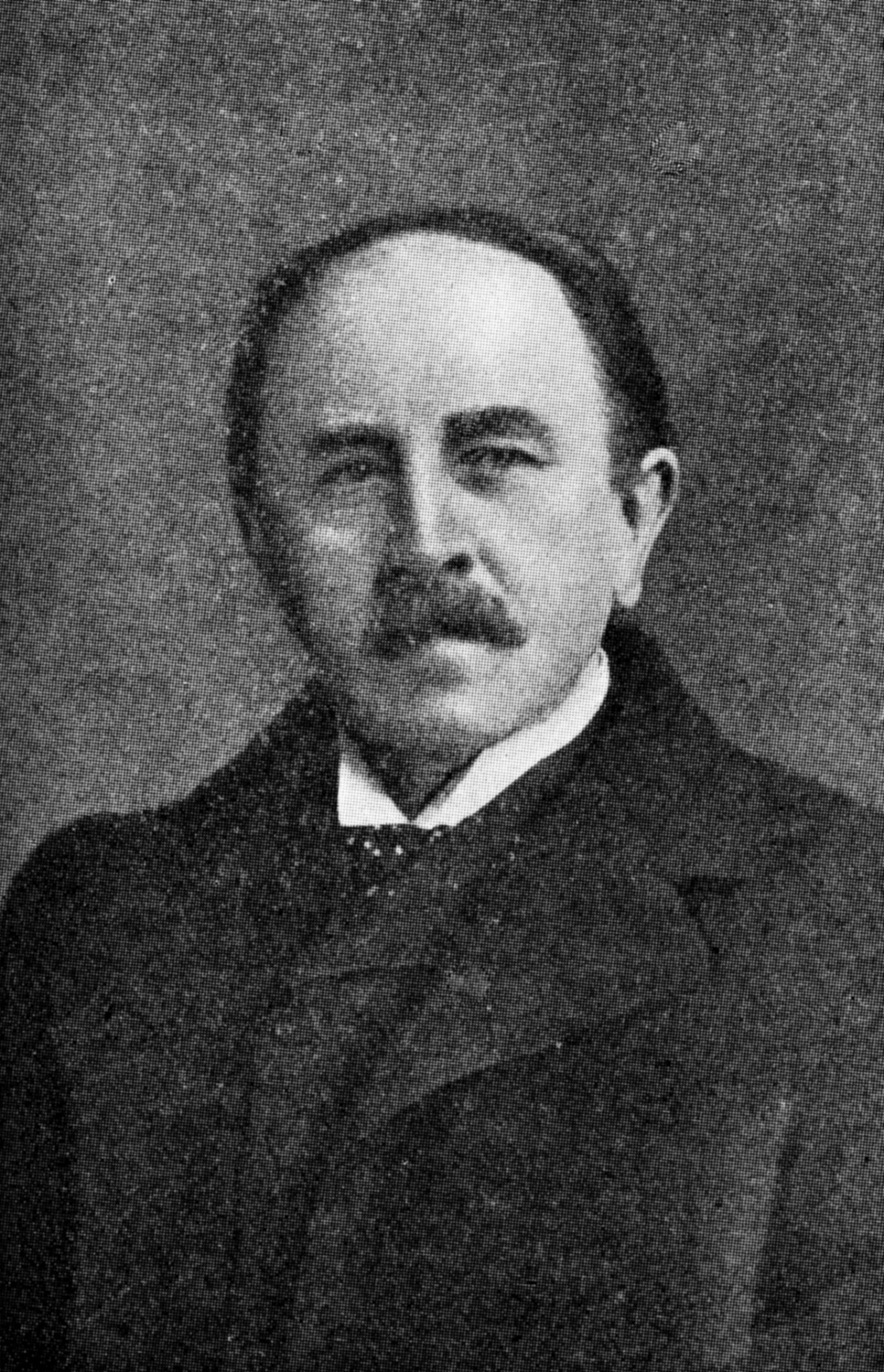
Sydney Howard Vines FRS (1849–1934), the Sherardian Chair of Botany at the University of Oxford and President of the Linnean Society of London, first owner of the house

The Vines is a house on Pullens Lane, Headington, a suburb in east Oxford, England. It was the first house to be built on the west side of the lane, on land that was originally owned by the Morrell family, local brewers. The house is built of red brick with stone dressings.

The house was built in 1889–90 for Professor Sydney Howard Vines (1849–1934). It was designed by the Victorian architect Harry Wilkinson Moore (1850–1915). In 1923, it became known as The Vineyard, after the first owner, Professor Vines.

In 1948, the Vineyard was purchased by the United Oxford Hospitals, who renamed it to be Pollock House after its last owner. From 1948 to 1956, it was used as the Nurses Training School of the then Wingfield-Morris Orthopaedic Hospital, now the Nuffield Orthopaedic Centre. From 1958 till around 1976, it was used as the hospital's Night Nurses' Home. Subsequently, it was part of Oxford Brookes University until 2004.

The house was renamed to The Vines, is now occupied by Scholarship & Christianity in Oxford (SCIO), the United Kingdom centre of the Council for Christian Colleges and Universities (CCCU).

Close by, also in Pullens Lane, is Cotuit Hall, part of EF International Academy and previously one of the halls of residence at Oxford Brookes University. This was designed by the same architect, H. W. Moore, and built in 1892. In the past, it was known as Napier House.
