= Warnborough Road =

Road in North Oxford, England

Coordinates: 51.7646°N 1.2671°W

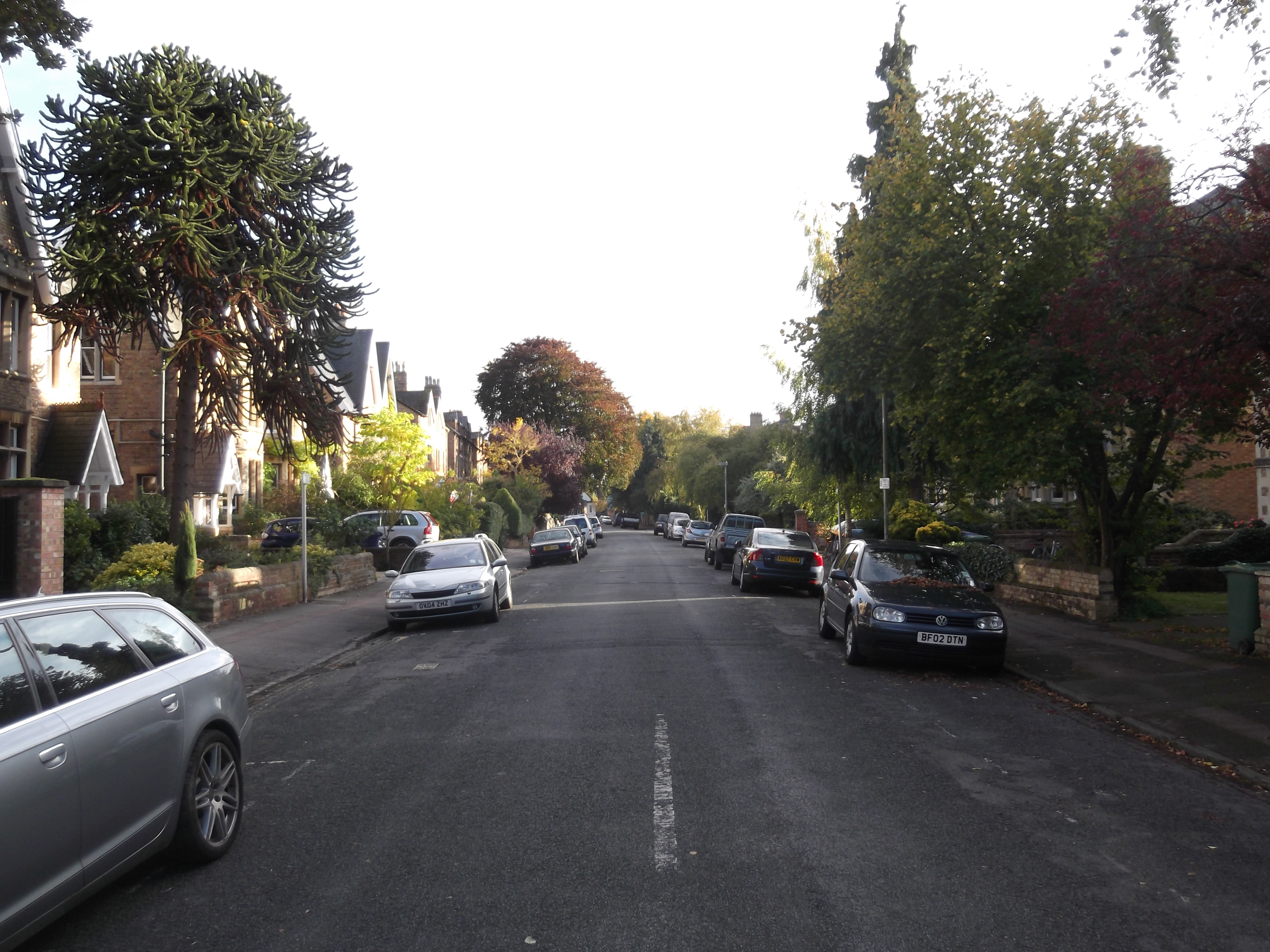
View south from the junction with Farndon Road.

Warnborough Road is a residential road in North Oxford, England.

At the southern end of the road is a junction with Leckford Road and at the northern end is a junction with Farndon Road, two roads that lead west off Woodstock Road, a major arterial road out of Oxford to the north. Tackley Place leads west halfway up the road to Kingston Road. Opposite the junction at the southern end is part of d'Overbroeck's College (for Year 7 to Year 11).

The area where Warnborough Road is located in Walton Manor was originally owned by St John's College, Oxford. Houses in the road were first leased by the college between 1877 and 1896. Nos 7 and 8 were designed by the architect Harry Wilkinson Moore. Nos 22 to 33 are by John Galpin & George Shirley. The houses are in a late Victorian style and of brick construction.

The premises for Daily Information were originally located in Warnborough Road, founded by John Rose (1925–2004) in 1964. Warnborough College was founded on Warnborough Road in 1973 and moved to Yatscombe Hall, former home to the Greek scholar Gilbert Murray and Lord Shawcross, at Boars Hill about four miles south from the city of Oxford in 1976.

Oxford Research Group was previously located at 22 Warnborough Road, but has now moved to London.
