= St Margaret's Church, Oxford =

St Margaret's Church
- Parish Church of St Philip and St James with St Margaret
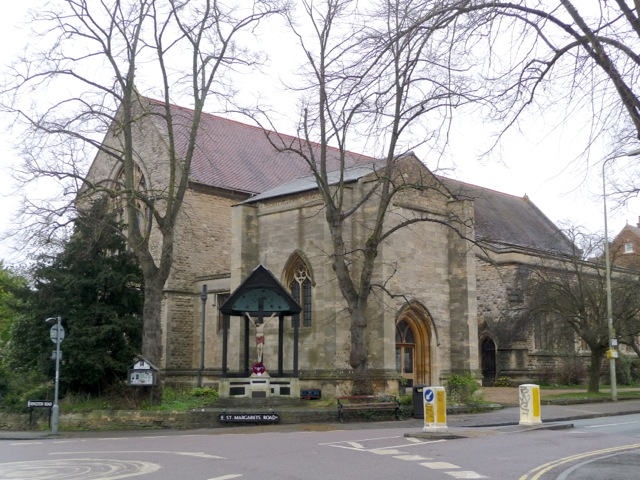
- St Margaret's Church, looking northeast from Kingston Road.
- St Margaret's Church
- 51.766725°N 1.268505°W
- OS grid reference: SP 50576 07813
- Location: St Margaret's Road, Oxford
- Country: England
- Denomination: Church of England
- Churchmanship: Liberal Anglo-Catholic
- Website: stmargaretsoxford.org

History
- Dedication: Saint Margaret of Antioch
- Consecrated: 1893

Architecture
- Style: Gothic Revival architecture
- Years built: 1893

Administration
- Province: Canterbury
- Diocese: Oxford
- Archdeaconry: Oxford
- Deanery: Oxford

Clergy
- Vicar: Daniel Walters

St Margaret's Church is a church in North Oxford, England. It is near the northern end of Kingston Road, at the corner of St Margaret's Road.

The church was built between 1883 and 1893. The building is Grade II listed. The parish War Memorial adjoins the southwestern end of St. Margaret's churchyard. Dedicated in 1920, it is in the form of a calvary.

== History and features ==
As north Oxford was built up and its population grew in Victorian times, new parishes were created out of parts of St. Giles' parish. They included St Philip and St James', consecrated in 1862 and St. Margaret's, founded as a daughter church of St. Philip and St James in 1883. The church was designed by H. G. W. Drinkwater. The foundation stone was laid on 8 May 1883. The church was consecrated by Bishop Stubbs on 22 November 1893. A new tower designed by G. F. Bodley was started in 1899, but was never completed, this remains as the south-west porch. The Lady Chapel contains three fine windows by F. C. Eden based on an iconographic theme ‘The Plan of Salvation’, picturing the Nativity (Incarnation), the Crucifixion (Atonement) and Pentecost (the gift of the Spirit to the Church). St Margaret's became a parish in its own right in August 1896. It was reunited with St Philip and St James parish once more in 1976, and St Philip and St James Church was declared redundant in 1982. In 1983 the parish of St Philip and St James with St Margaret and the parish of St Giles were reunited in a united benefice.

== See also ==
- Harry Drinkwater, architect.
- George Frederick Bodley, architect.
- Frederick Charles Eden, architect and designer.
- William Stubbs, Bishop of Oxford.
