= William Woodruff =

British economic historian (1916–2008)

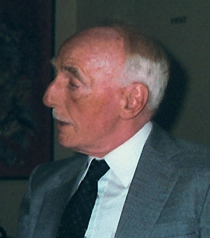
- Born: 12 September 1916; Blackburn, Lancashire, United Kingdom
- Died: 23 September 2008 (aged 92); Gainesville, Florida, United States
- Citizenship: British, United States (naturalised)
- Education: St Catherine's College, University of Oxford; Harvard University (Fulbright Scholar)
- Occupations: Professor; historian; writer
- Spouse(s): Katharine (married 1940 – her death in 1959); Helga (married 1960 – his death)
- Writing career
- Subjects: Economic and world history, autobiography, fiction
- Notable works: The Road To Nab End: A Lancashire Childhood; Beyond Nab End; Vessel of Sadness; Impact of Western Man: A Study of Europe's Role in the World Economy, 1750–1960; A Concise History of the Modern World: 1500 to the Present

William Woodruff (12 September 1916 – 23 September 2008) was a professor of world history and author. His two autobiographical works, The Road to Nab End and its sequel Beyond Nab End, both became bestsellers in the United Kingdom. The memoirs, covering Woodruff's impoverished upbringing in an English weaving community during the Great Depression, contain significant amounts of social commentary about the conditions in which he lived.

== Early life ==
Woodruff was born on 12 September 1916, in Blackburn, Lancashire. His parents were cotton weavers by trade (although at the time of his birth his father was serving on the Western Front). The Road to Nab End vividly describes his upbringing and his family's fight to survive the Lancashire cotton industry's initial downturn in 1920, through its decline in the 1920s, and the community's slide into the Great Depression that followed. Woodruff contributed to his family's income, initially as a newspaper delivery boy before and after school. He entered the workforce as a "grocer's lad" (shop assistant) at the age of 13, and after several enforced changes of job decided to leave Lancashire for a promise of a job in London at the age of 16.

== London and Oxford ==
Beyond Nab End describes his life after arriving in London. He worked for two years as a "sand rat" in an East End iron foundry (the sand is used to make molds into which molten iron was poured). He attended night school, discovering a love of learning (or perhaps re-discovering, as there are clear indications that his grandmother Bridget, and other adults, encouraged this love when he was younger). In 1936, with the aid of a London County Council scholarship, he gained a place at the Catholic Workers College (later Plater College), Oxford. In 1938 he was then admitted as a fully accredited member of the University of Oxford, joining St Catherine's Society in St Aldates (now St Catherine's College). In a unique gesture, Oxford waived its entrance examination to admit him. It was at Oxford that he met his first wife Katharine, whom he married in 1940.

== Second World War ==
In 1939, Woodruff volunteered for the army and served during the Second World War. He fought with the 24th Guards Brigade, of the 1st Infantry Division, in North Africa and the Mediterranean region. His wartime experiences, in particular the beach landings at Anzio, became the basis of his work Vessel of Sadness, which A. L. Rowse called one of the "most sensitive and moving books of the war, both authentic and poetic" in a review in the Times Literary Supplement.

At the end of 1945, he returned to the wife he had seen for "five weeks in five years" and his eldest son, whom he had never met. His first wife died of cancer in 1959, and Woodruff remarried in 1960.

== Academic career ==
In 1946 he renewed his studies in economic and world history at Oxford. In 1950 he became a Houblon-Norman research fellow supported by the Bank of England, and in 1952 he went as a Fulbright Scholar to Harvard University. He then spent a period as a professor at the University of Illinois before moving in 1956 to head the Department of Economic History at the University of Melbourne, Australia, where he met his second wife Helga. He followed this with various visiting professorships to Princeton, Berlin, Tokyo and Oxford. He was a Graduate Research Professor at the University of Florida from 1966 to his retirement in 1996 when he became a Professor Emeritus.

== Death ==
He died in Gainesville, Florida on 23 September 2008. He was survived by his wife Helga, their daughter and four sons, and by two sons from his first marriage.

== Bibliography ==
=== Academic history ===
- Impact of Western Man – A Study of Europe's Role in the World Economy, 1750–1960, London, Macmillan, 1969.
- America's Impact on the World: A Study of the Role of the United States in the World Economy, 1750–1970, London, Macmillan, 1975.
- A Concise History of the Modern World: 1500 to the Present, A guide to world affairs, 5th edition, London, Abacus (Little, Brown and Company), 2005.

=== Autobiographical works ===
- The Road To Nab End: A Lancashire Childhood, Abacus, 2002 (first published as Billy Boy, Ryburn Publishing Ltd., 1993); Eland, 2011
- A stage adaptation of The Road to Nab End by Philip Goulding premiered at the Oldham Coliseum Theatre under the direction of Kevin Shaw in June 2010.
- Beyond Nab End, Abacus, 2003

=== Fiction ===
- Vessel of Sadness (drawn from his experiences during World War II). Gainesville: Kallman Publishing Co., 1969; London: Chatto and Windus, 1970; London: Abacus, 2004.
- Paradise Galore, London: Dent and Sons, 1985, German translation by Wolf Harranth as Reise zum Paradies, Weinheim: Beltz & Gelberg, 1985
- Shadows of Glory, London: Abacus, 2003.
