= Ken Messer =

British painter

- Born: 3 July 1931; Newport, Monmouth, Wales
- Died: 28 April 2018 (aged 86); Oxfordshire, England
- Education: City of Oxford High School for Boys
- Known for: Architectural painting, Landscape painting, Watercolour painting, Drawing
- Website: www.kenmesser.co.uk

Ken J. Messer (1931–2018) was a British watercolour painter and draughtsman.

Ken Messer was born in Newport, South Wales, and was educated at the City of Oxford High School for Boys in Oxford, where he spent much of his time during his life. After school, Messer worked in accountancy for six years in Oxford. He then joined British Overseas Airways Corporation (BOAC) as a steward, flying internationally. Injury due to a car accident during the 1960s meant that he joined the design department of Pergamon Press in Oxford at the age of 33. Six years later, he was appointed to the position of studio manager, in charge of art and design.

In 1974, Messer left Pergamon Press to become a freelance graphic designer. He started painting more watercolours, becoming a fulltime artist. During the 1980s, his ink drawings were regularly published in the Oxford Times. He has sometimes been called "The Oxford Artist" because of his large number of artworks depicting the city of Oxford.

Prints of Messer's artworks have been published by the Burford Gallery, Kingfisher Prints, Rosenstiels, and Templecrest Art. His work has been shown at Royal Institute of Painters in Water Colours annual exhibitions, held at the Mall Galleries, the base of the Federation of British Artists in London. Messer won prizes at three consecutive biennial international Saunders Artist in Watercolour competitions and in The Artist magazine watercolour competition. His paintings have been sold at auctions, including at Christie's, South Kensington, in London.

Ken Messer was married to Dilys Lloyd. They lived in Richmond upon Thames, southwest London, and then the town of Abingdon on the River Thames, south of Oxford. They had two sons and one daughter together.
