= Sydney Howard Vines =

British Botanist and Academic

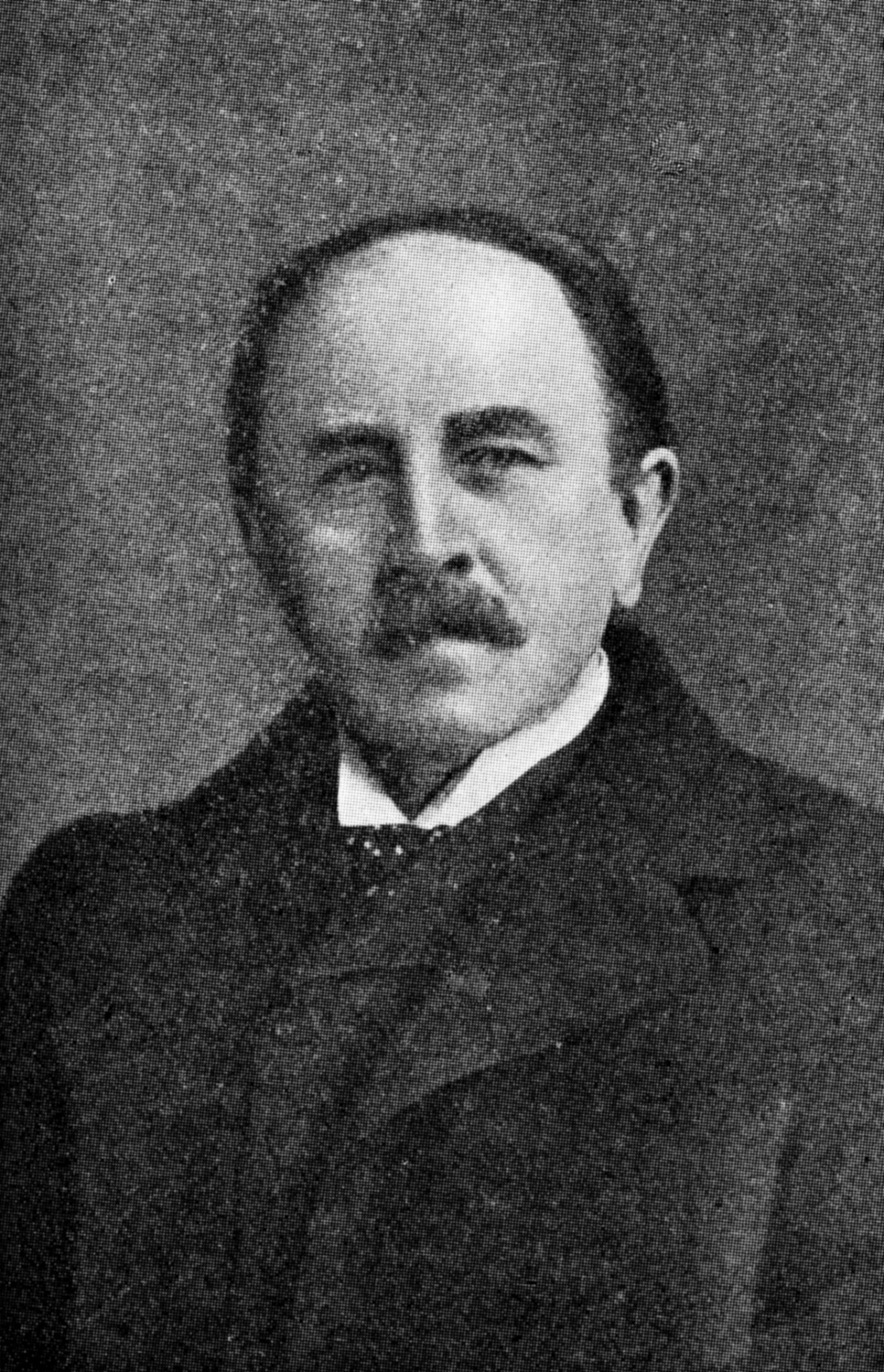
Sydney Howard Vines

Sydney Howard Vines FRS (31 December 1849 – 4 April 1934) was a British botanist and academic. He was Sherardian Professor of Botany at Oxford University from 1888 to 1919, and served as president of the Linnean Society of London from 1900 to 1904. He directed the publication of the Annals of Botany from 1887 to 1899.

== Education and career ==
Vines studied at Christ's College, Cambridge, obtaining his Bachelor of Science in 1873, Bachelor of Arts in 1876, Master of Arts in 1879, and his doctorate in 1883. He became a member of the Linnean Society of London in 1885 and elected to honorary membership of the Manchester Literary and Philosophical Society on 17 April 1894. although spelt sIdney.

== Works ==
Vines' works include:

- "On the Apparatus Relating to Vegetable Physiology". Science Lectures at South Kensington. Vol. I. London: Macmillan & Company. 1878. pp. 249–263.
- Text-book of Botany, Morphological and Physical, 2nd edition, (1882), edited, with an appendix, by Sydney H. Vines, from the German of Lehrbuch der Botanik by Julius von Sachs
- Lectures on the physiology of plants. University press. 1886.
- A Course of Practical Instruction in Botany. BiblioBazaar. 1887. ISBN 978-0-554-86700-7.
- A Student's Text-book of Botany. S. Sonnenschein & Company. 1896; 821 pages
  - An Elementary Text-Book of Botany ... With 397 Illustrations. London. 1905; 611 pages; updated and abridged version of A Student's Text-book of Botany
- An Account of the Herbarium of the University of Oxford. 1897.
- An Elementary Text-book of Botany: From the German of Dr. K. Prantl (1898), The Dillenian Herbaria, (1907).

== Additional information ==
His parents' birthnames were William Reynolds and Jessie Robertson. He married an Agnes Bertha Perry in 1884. The Vines, Oxford was built for him. He was the father of the author and academic Sherard Vines.
