= Sherard Vines =

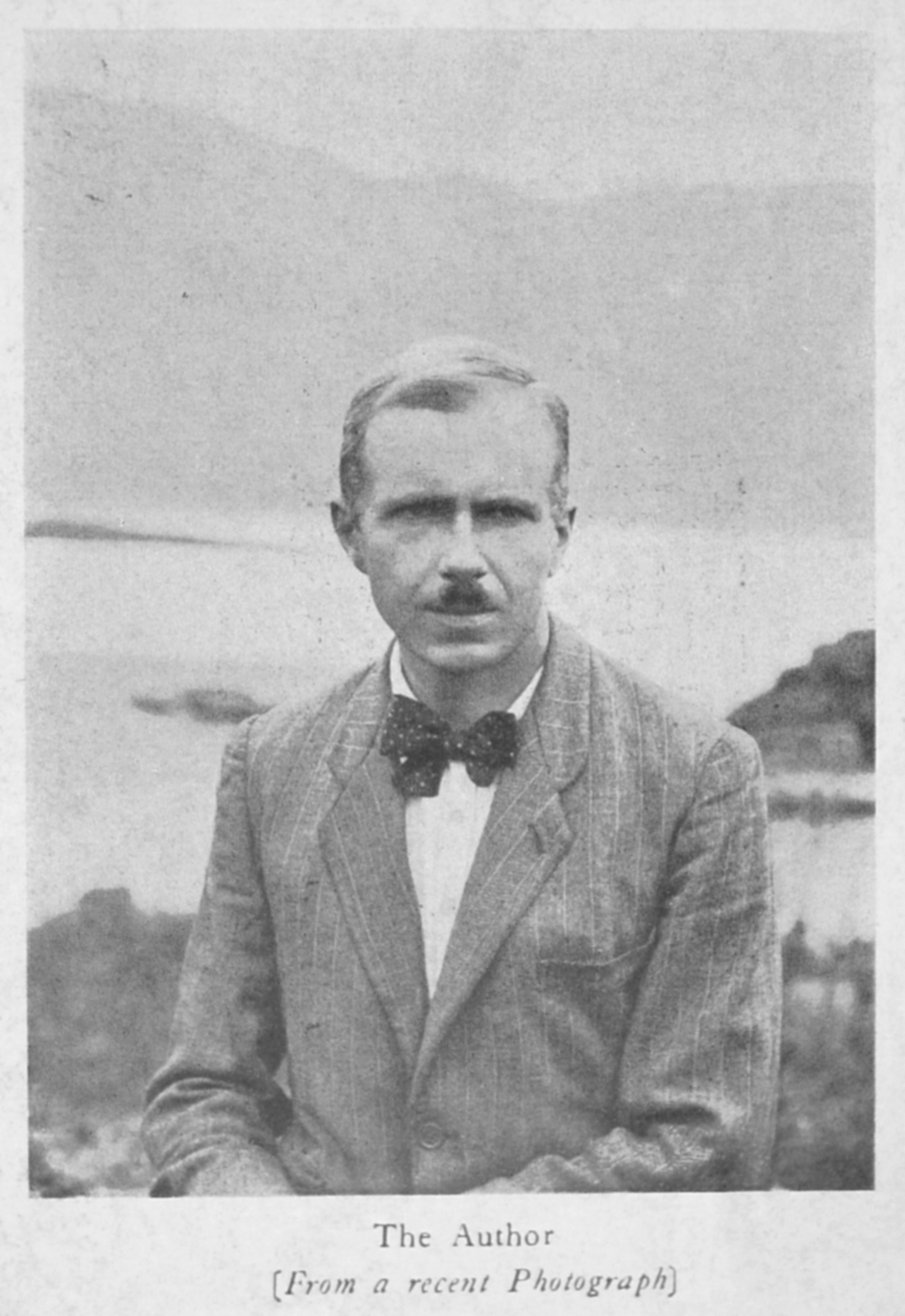
- Vines in Japan, circa 1927
- Born: Walter Sherard Vines; 1890; Oxford
- Died: 1974 (aged 83–84)
- Education: New College, Oxford
- Occupations: Author and academic
- Spouses: Helene Ernestine Dreyfus (m. 1916, divorced); Agnes Rennie Cumming (m. 1930)
- Children: Jeannine A. R. Vines; Rennie J. Vines
- Relatives: Sydney Howard Vines (father)
- Writing career
- Language: English
- Years active: 1910–1950

Walter Sherard Vines (1890–1974), known as Sherard Vines, was an English author and academic. He began publishing poetry in the 1910s, then in the 1920s spent five years teaching at Keio University in Tokyo, Japan. While in Japan and after his return to England, where he took up a post at University College Hull, he continued to publish poetry, fiction and criticism. His works include The Course of English Classicism from the Tudor to Victorian Age (1930), a study of classicism in British art; Yofuku, or, Japan in Trousers (1931), a travel book about his experiences in Japan which was critical of aspects of Japanese culture; and A Hundred Years of English Literature (1959), a survey of the literature of Britain, the British Empire and the United States.

== Early life and career ==
Sherard Vines was born in Oxford in 1890. His father, Sydney Howard Vines, was Sherardian Professor of Botany at the University of Oxford and named his son after William Sherard. He attended Magdalen College School and New College, Oxford. His tutor at Oxford was the literary scholar George Stuart Gordon.

From 1910 to 1914 he was editor of Oxford Poetry, in which he also published his own work. He held an academic position at Belfast University until the outbreak of the First World War in 1914. He served in the Highland Light Infantry until 1917, when he was wounded and forced to return to civilian life. While in France, he had married a 21-year-old Salvadorean-born Frenchwoman, Helene Ernestine Dreyfus. She joined him in England, and gave birth to a daughter, Jeannine in 1922.

His collection The Two Worlds was reviewed in 1917 in Poetry, where it was described as an uneven work in which "it would seem as though the author, in advancing, grew bolder in thought, more daring as to form, casting aside tritenesses and careless rhymes that mar the first part of the work." In the following years Vines was associated with the Bloomsbury Group and poems of his were included in the Sitwells' Wheels anthologies between 1917 and 1921. In 1920 he published The Kaleidoscope: Poems for the People. Reviewing The Kaleidoscope in Poetry, Marion Strobel commented that the volume "springs fearlessly from one subject to another" and prefers "a harsh simplicity" to "sensuous cadences"or "beauty of wording".

== Japan ==
Starting in 1923, Vines taught for five years at Keio University in Tokyo. He was invited to Keio by Junzaburō Nishiwaki, whom he had met in England and who later translated some of his works into Japanese. Vines' arrival in Japan was simultaneous with that of fellow English poet Edmund Blunden, who taught at the Imperial University of Tokyo. In 1924 and 1925 Vines contributed short stories to Blunden's Oriental Literary Times. These included the semi-autobiographical "Also Ran", about an obscure author denied the success he believes he deserves. In 1925 he published a critical biography of the Japanese author Yone Noguchi. From 1925 to 1927 he was a tutor to Yasuhito, Prince Chichibu.

Another poetry collection, The Pyramid, was published in 1926. A reviewer for the Times Literary Supplement wrote of The Pyramid: "[Vines'] despair is significant because it is so intellectually positive ... His verse is remarkable for the piercing violence with which it expresses the disenchantment of one for whom the world has become divested of value." Movements in Modern English Poetry and Prose, composed mostly of lectures Vines had given and written with Japanese students in mind, was published in 1927. A review in The Criterion described the book as "not only up-to-date and impartial, but also full of acute perceptions and judgments." While in Japan he also became friends with the South African author William Plomer, who spent the years 1926–29 there and described Vines as "a poet of distinction", albeit "neglected ... by a reading public too easily hypnotized by the parrot-like repetition of names and too incurious to find things out for itself".

== Return to Europe ==
Vines returned to Europe in 1928 to take up a position as Professor of English at University College Hull. That year he published a further volume of poetry, Triforium, which featured works that had previously appeared in the Japanese literary magazine Mita Bungaku. His novel Humours Unreconciled: A Tale of Modern Japan, published in 1928, satirises the expatriate community in Tokyo in the 1920s and comments on the perceived prevalence of suicide in Japan through the tale of an extramarital affair and a murder misrepresented as a suicide. The Course of English Classicism from the Tudor to Victorian Age, a critical study, was published in 1930. The book sought to trace the growth of classicism in British art beginning in the Tudor period. George Orwell, reviewing the book in the New Adelphi, noted that Vines viewed poetry as "a thing of wit, grandeur and good sense, not of 'magic' and seductive sounds", and praised Vines' "admirable account of the main drift of classicism". A reviewer in The Review of English Studies described it as "a very stimulating and provocative book" which would encourage a reconsideration of Augustan literature. At Hull he was a colleague, friend and neighbour of the economist Eric Roll. Vines' students at Hull included Harold Andrew Mason. In 1930 Vines he married his second wife, Agnes Rennie Cumming; their daughter, Rennie J. Vines, was born in 1933.

His travel book Yofuku, or, Japan in Trousers was published in 1931 and overlaps to a degree with Humours Unreconciled. It contains numerous references to his time at Keio and discussion of the perceived eccentricities of Japanese society, customs and cuisine. Vines described the typical Japanese student as "personally as a rule most charming, and sometimes a trifle pathetic", and noted divergent attitudes among Japanese people toward foreigners. In the book Vines also sought to establish connections between features of Japanese life and the Japanese climate and cuisine. William Snell has argued that Yofuku portrays Japan in a less positive light than Humours Unreconciled, and reflects Vines' "particularly jaundiced view of [Japan] and its people". A reviewer in Pacific Affairs criticised Vines' focus on the aspects of Japanese life he found less pleasant, and asserted that "the informed reader, particularly one who has lived in Japan," would find it incomplete and one-sided, concluding "it is hard to imagine any considerable public for the book or any way in which that public could be served by its appearance."

Return, Belphegor!, a fantasy novel about the devil, was published in 1932. Georgian Satirists was published in 1934. In 1941 Green to Amber, a novel about English society in the late 1930s, was published. In 1950 Vines published A Hundred Years of English Literature, a survey of literature produced in the United Kingdom, United States and British Empire from around 1830. Reviewing it for Books Abroad, John Paul Pritchard described Vines as "a staunch defender of the Victorians" and noted the book's incomplete coverage of American literature. Robert Withington, reviewing the book in the CEA Critic, likewise noted certain omissions and argued that much of the book's material would be too obscure for students and too contentious and incomplete for academics. Vines remained at Hull until his retirement in 1952, and died in 1974.

== Works ==
=== Poetry ===
- The Two Worlds (1916)
- The Kaleidoscope (1921)
- The Pyramid (1926)
- Triforium (1928)

=== Novels ===
- Humours Unreconciled: A Tale of Modern Japan (1928)
- Return, Belphegor! (1932)
- Green to Amber (1941)

=== Other works ===
- Yone Noguchi: A Critical Study (1925)
- Movements in Modern English Poetry and Prose (1927)
- The Course of English Classicism from the Tudor to the Victorian Age (1930)
- Yofuku, or, Japan in Trousers (1931)
- Georgian Satirists (1934)
- A Hundred Years of English Literature (1950)
