= Plater College =

Former adult education establishment in Oxford, England, 1921–2005

Coordinates: 51°45′29″N 1°13′40″W

Plater College was an adult education establishment which was based in Oxford, England.

== College history ==
The college was founded in 1921 by Father Leo O'Hea, S.J. (1881–1976), director of the Catholic Social Guild, in memory of the Father Charles Dominic Plater S.J., who had been instrumental in founding the Guild in 1909, giving the Catholic Social Movement its first organizational structure in England, and who had died in Malta the prior year. The College was originally called the Catholic Workers' College, and, after beginning in temporary premises on the Iffley Road, was located on Walton Well Road in Oxford from late 1923 where it remained until 1955, when it moved to Boars Hill.

Under the leadership of Joseph Kirwan (1910–2005), who became principal in 1962, it was renamed Plater College in 1965, and moved from makeshift facilities at Boars Hill to a new purpose-built residential college on Pullens Lane in Headington during the late 1970s.

Plater College was home to the G. K. Chesterton Institute in the UK, and the G. K. Chesterton Library, and publisher of the literary journal, Second Spring.

Plater had a Catholic ethos with daily mass being said before the evening meal. St Joseph the Worker was the patron saint of the college, with a statue of the saint at the entrance. Students did not have to be Catholic to attend the college, but students were supported by resident priests and also a community of apostolic sisters who were affiliated with the college.

== Educational mission ==
It offered further education with an emphasis on Catholic social teaching to students who had vocational qualifications, those who had entered into employment directly from school or some who had missed other educational opportunities. It was considered a sister-school to secular Ruskin College, on which it was modelled. Plater College members were affiliate members of the University of Oxford, and were eligible to take the University examinations for the Special Diploma in Social Studies and Special Diploma in Social Policy & Administration. They were also eligible for Life Membership / Temporary Membership of the Oxford Union. The students were also enrolled to use the Bodleian Library. Lectures could be attended at Oxford colleges as well as The Schools.

The following subjects could be studied at Plater: Theology, Moral Philosophy, Ethics, Law, Pastoral Studies, Politics, Philosophy and Economics, Psychology, Social Studies, Sociology, Criminology. Students also undertook a course in Christianity and Society. Additional study could be undertaken in English, Mathematics and Quantitative Methods.

== Closure ==
The college operated very successfully until just after the Millennium, with significant academic achievement under successive principals; Joseph Kirwan, Dennis Chiles and Michael Blades. After this period, the College changed its emphasis, moving away from a strong educational ethos with a foundation in Catholic Social Teaching. The College had broken its affiliation with the University; Plater students were no longer eligible to sit the University's examinations and the College management adopted a more generalist education approach, transitioning the College into a Short Course Campus. Thereafter, following a controversial period, it closed in July 2005 following a negative report from the Adult Learning Inspectorate released in November 2004 and the resignation of its principal, Robert Beckinsale, amid recriminations and allegations of scandal. The trustees announced that the decision to close had been taken because "acceptably high standards of education can no longer be assured at Plater".

The Plater College Foundation was formed to oppose the closure, and sued the college trustees, Board of Governors and the Catholic Education Service. The lawsuit was dropped when the foundation ran out of funds.

== Charles Plater Trust ==
The college's 2.67-acre (0.0108 km^{2}) campus in Pullens Lane, one of the most exclusive residential areas of Headington, was sold a year later to EF Language Schools for £5.6 million. Proceeds from the sale were used to establish the Charles Plater Trust, which uses the income from the fund to make charitable grants for the advancement of education consistent with Catholic social teaching. One initiative funded by the Trust is the website Virtual Plater.

== Notable students ==
- Eddie Linden (poet, dropped out)
- Edward Scicluna (Maltese politician)
- Lino Spiteri (Maltese politician)
- William Woodruff (economic historian)
- Tom Pendry (politician)
