= City of Oxford High School for Boys =

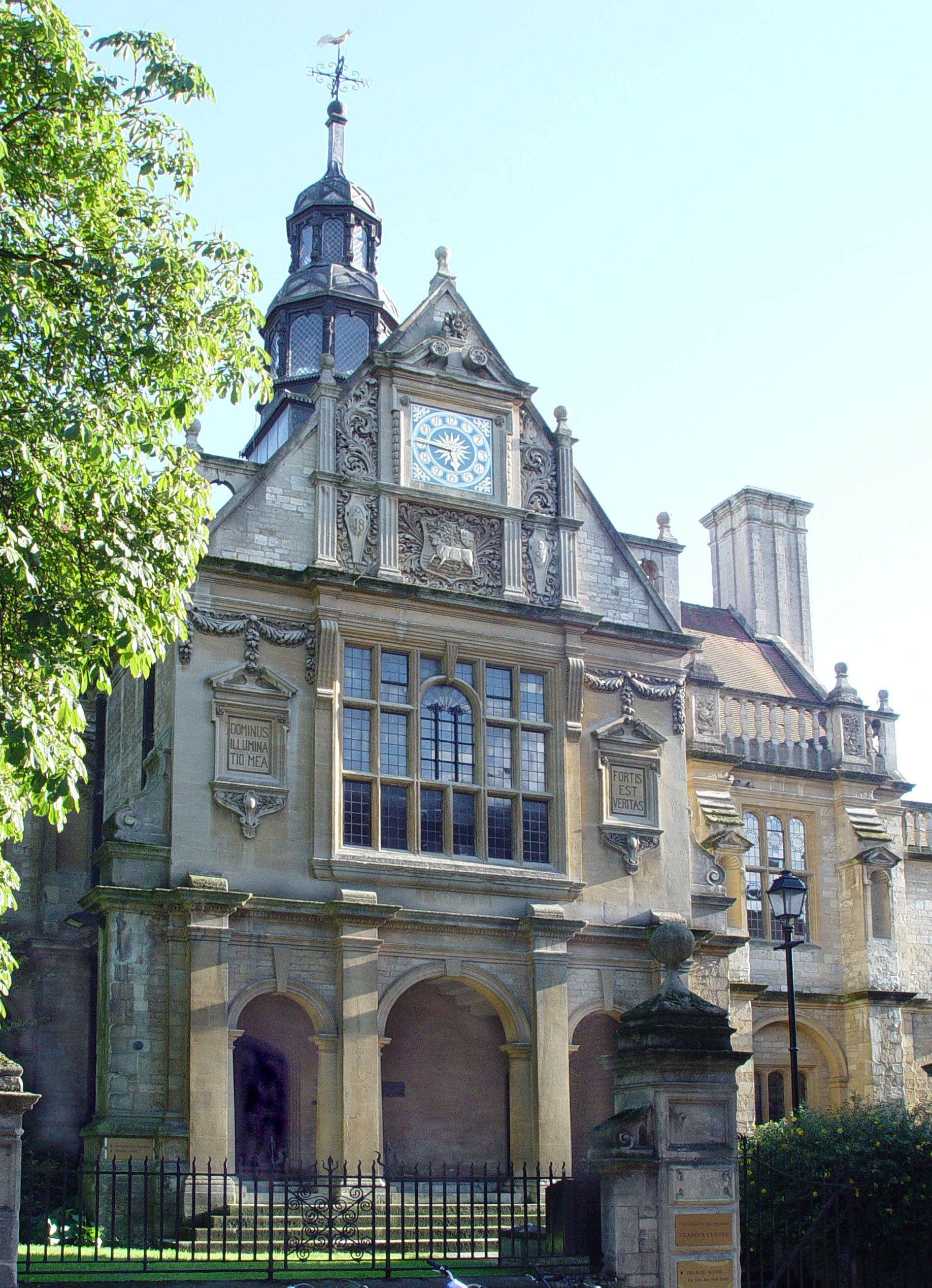

Location
- George Street; Oxford, Oxfordshire; England
- 51°45′12″N 1°15′41″W

Information
- Type: Grammar school
- Established: 1881
- Closed: 1966
- Local authority: City of Oxford
- Gender: Boys
- Age: 11 to 18
- Website: https://cosa-oxford.co.uk/

The City of Oxford High School for Boys (a.k.a. Oxford High School for Boys and City of Oxford School) was founded in 1881 by Thomas Hill Green to provide Oxford boys with an education which would enable them to prepare for University.

== History ==
It was administered by the City of Oxford Education Committee, with around 400 boys enrolled. The school finally closed in 1966, when it was combined with what was then Southfield Grammar School to form a grammar school, known as Oxford School at that time (the present Oxford Spires Academy).

== The building ==
The Victorian stone building, bearing the arms of both the City and University, was designed by Sir Thomas Jackson, and still stands at the corner of George Street and New Inn Hall Street. Additional classrooms were later added in the playground, a space that was contained on the south side by an extensive length of the city's mediaeval wall. The school remained here until 1966, when it moved to the Southfield Grammar School site (now occupied by Oxford Spires Academy) in Glanville Road off Cowley Road. The George Street building for some years housed the Classics Department of Oxford University, but was transferred to the History Faculty in 2007. The History Faculty relocated to the Schwarzman Centre for the Humanities in 2026.

The school's playing fields were in North Oxford, along and beside Marston Ferry Road and which later housed the Old Boy's Rugby Club.

== Inscription ==
The George Street building has the following inscription on it:

Thomas Hill Green (1832–82). Educationalist, Fellow of Balliol, White's Professor of Moral Philosophy, elected (1876) first University Member of Oxford City Council to help found and establish the High School for Boys (1881–1966), thereby completing the city's 'ladder of learning' from elementary school to university—
A project dearest to his heart.
Thus were united town and gown in common cause.

== The staff ==
During the late 1940s, the headmaster was F. C. ("Freddy") Lay (a plaque to him is sited on the back of the New George Street Building as he was the first old boy to become head); he was succeeded by Mr R. W. Bodey in 1962.

=== Headmasters ===
- 1881–8 Arthur Pollard
- 1888–1925 Arthur Cave
- 1925–32 Wilfrid Parkinson

== School tradition ==
The school motto "Labor Vincit Omnia" ('tis work that conquers all) was carved above the prefects' door, and became the basis for the school song that every boy knew by heart:

In tranquil days of long ago
Under good Victoria's rule
Their faith in Oxford's youth to show
Our grandsires built a school.
"Labor Vincit Omnia"
Tis work that conquers all.
This gem of ancient Roman lore
Was carved above the prefects' door.
"Nemo Repente Sapit", too,
Was there beside it in full view,
Reminding those of slower pace
That perseverance wins the race.
Labor Vincit Omnia
Labor Vincit Omnia

Each November, the School Speech Day took place in Oxford Town Hall. First there was a church service in St Mary's Church on the High Street in the morning, then the main event in the afternoon started with a procession of staff in academic robes and hoods. In December, there was a school carol service in the University Church.

The boy's blazers were chocolate brown, as were the caps. In later years Sixth formers wore blue blazers. The striped tie was brown with red and blue diagonal piping. On entry to the school, every boy became a member of one of the four school houses: Lawrence, Jolliffe, Kerry or Salter.

== Legacy ==
The former pupils of the City of Oxford High School now have their own Old Boys Association, called the City of Oxford School Association (COSA).

Following the merger of the Oxford High School for Boys, and many changes (including loss of grammar school status, a switch to coeducation and becoming a Foundation School), there remains a school at the Glanville Road site: the Oxford Spires Academy.

== Notable alumni ==
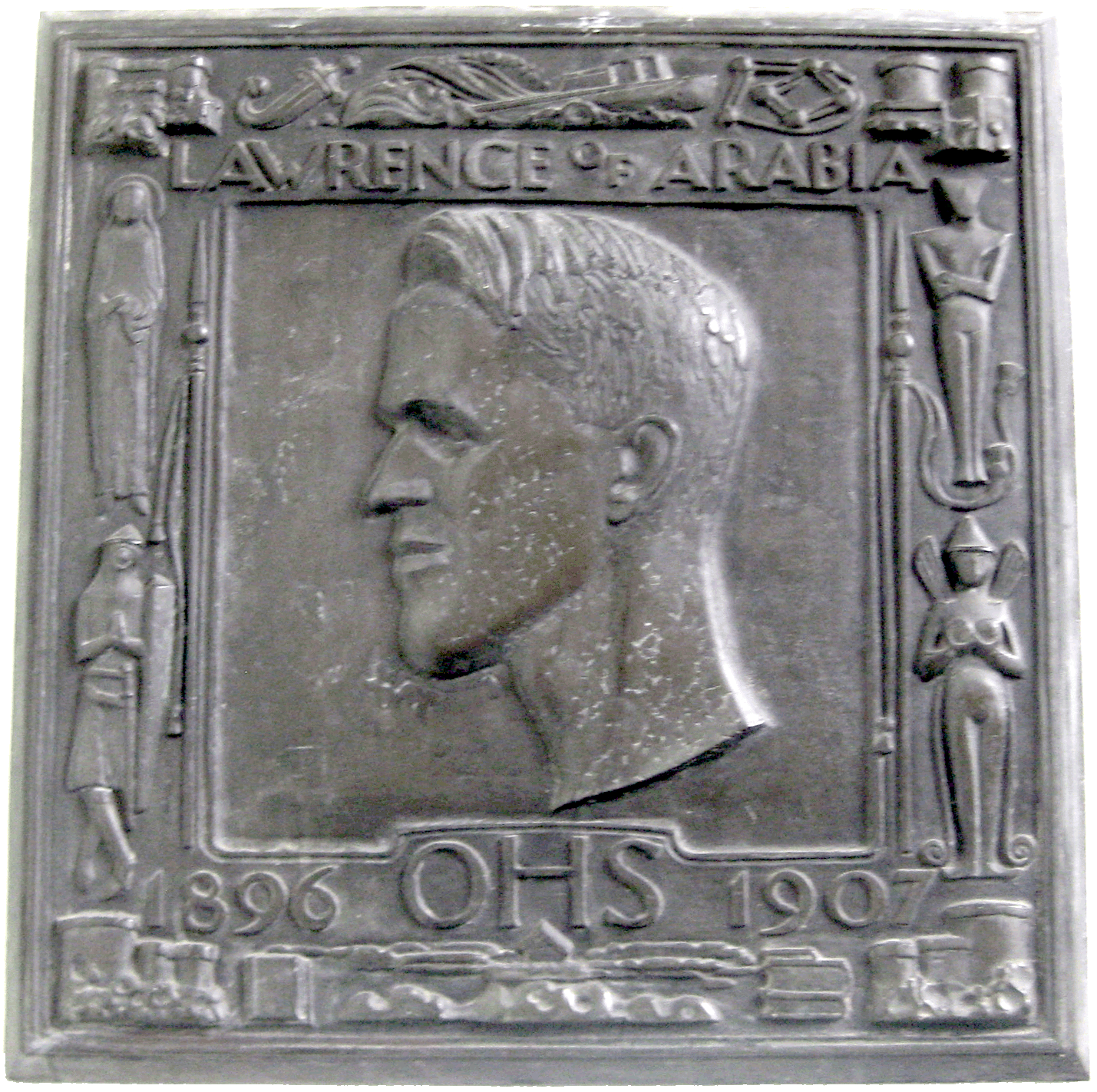
Memorial to Lawrence of Arabia in Oxford Boys' High School

- Ronnie Barker, comedian.
- Dr Cyril Beeson, entomologist and antiquarian horologist.
- Prof. Rupert E. Billingham, Professor of Cell Biology from 1971 to 1986 at the University of Texas Southwestern Medical Center, did important early work with Sir Peter Medawar on organ transplantation, and President from 1974 to 1976 of the Transplantation Society.
- Theodore William Chaundy, mathematician.
- Brian Cobby, voice of the British speaking clock.
- John Drinkwater, poet and playwright.
- Jack Gibbons, pianist and composer.
- Arthur Hawes, Archdeacon of Lincoln.
- Rt. Rev. Alan Hopes, Roman Catholic Bishop of East Anglia.
- The Baron Hunt of Kings Heath, Labour peer and former Minister in DEFRA and the DECC, and President from 1998 to 1999 of the Family Planning Association.
- Tony Juniper, campaigner, writer, and environmentalist.
- Professor The Baron Krebs, Principal of Jesus College, Oxford from 2005 to 2015, and President from 1993 to 1994 of the Association for the Study of Animal Behaviour.
- Col. T. E. Lawrence, better known as 'Lawrence of Arabia', and his youngest brother Prof. A. W. Lawrence, Laurence Professor of Classical Archaeology at Cambridge University.
- Ken Messer, watercolourist and draughtsman.
- Neville Rogers, first-class cricketer
- The 1st Baron Salter, British politician and academic, Member of Parliament 1937–1950 and 1951–1953
- Rt. Rev. Russell Berridge White, Bishop of Tonbridge from 1959 to 1968.
- Heinz Wolff, scientist.

One of the four school houses was named after Lawrence. Large photographs of Lawrence and Drinkwater were displayed to the right and left of the main hall, to inspire pupils during morning assembly – Lawrence is now above the main staircase.
