= St Margaret's Road =

Road in North Oxford, England

Coordinates: 51°46′02″N 1°15′53″W

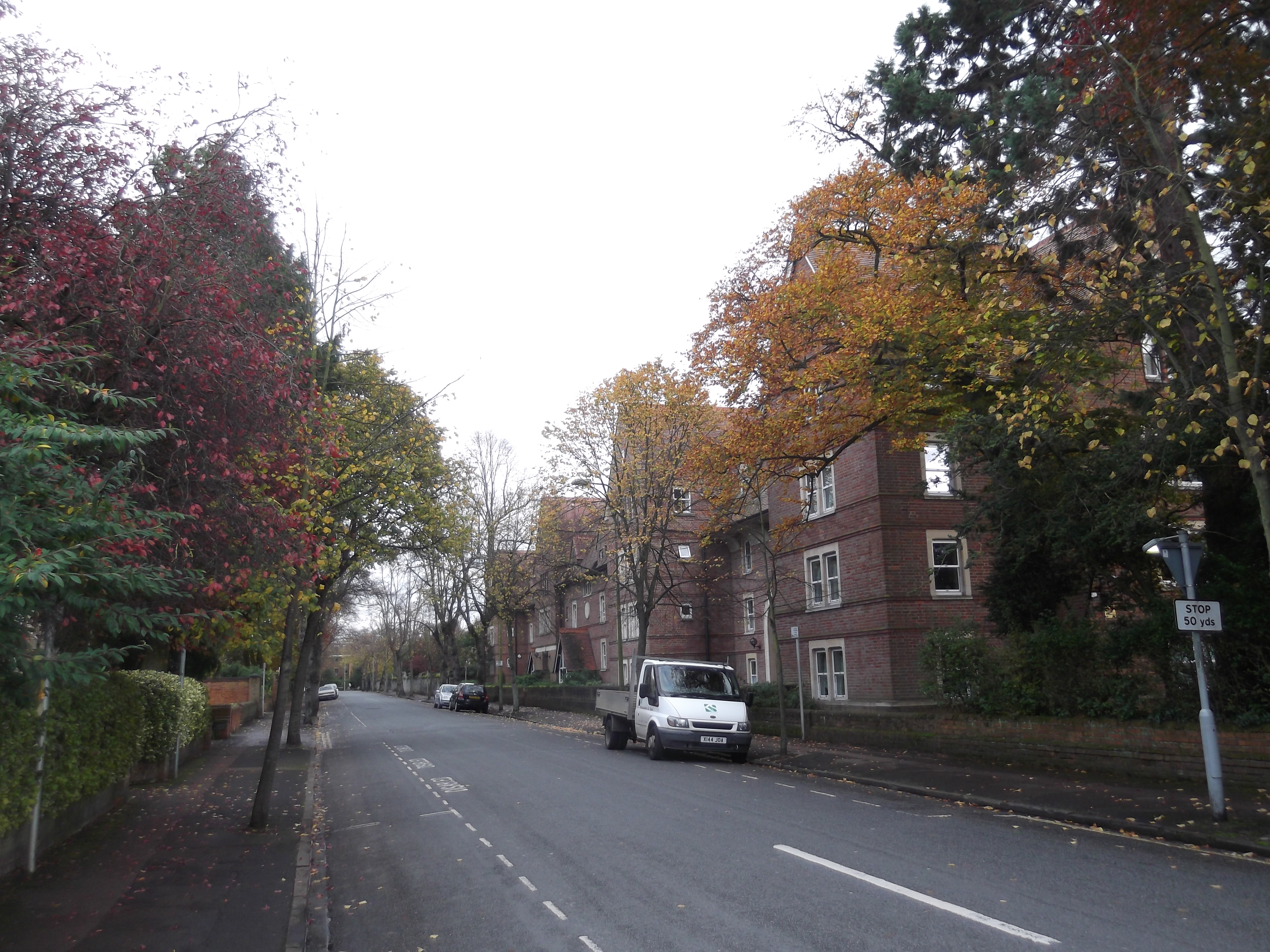
View east from the junction with Woodstock Road.

St Margaret's Road is a road in North Oxford, England.

== Location ==
The road runs between Kingston Road to the west and Banbury Road to the east, crossing Woodstock Road. To the south are Farndon Road to the west and Canterbury Road to the east. To the north are Polstead Road (west) and Rawlinson Road (east).

The main entrance of St Hugh's College, the northernmost Oxford college and one of the former women's colleges, is on the south side of the road. The grounds of the College stretch along the road from Woodstock Road to Banbury Road.

On the northeast corner with Kingston Road at the western end is St Margaret's parish church.

Green Templeton College has accommodation in several houses on St Margaret's Road.

== History ==
Rackham Lane, which later became St Margaret's Road, was laid out in 1879 as part of the Norham Manor estate. According to Henry Taunt, the part of the road between Banbury Road and Woodstock Road was called Gallows-Baulk Road. When the road was improved, the remains of several people who had been hanged were found.

The houses in St Margaret's Road were mostly designed by William Wilkinson and Harry Wilkinson Moore in partnership. They were built between 1879 and 1886. The main buildings of St Hugh's College are by Herbert Tudor Buckland and William Haywood, dating from 1914–16 and built in a neo-Georgian style.

== Gallery ==
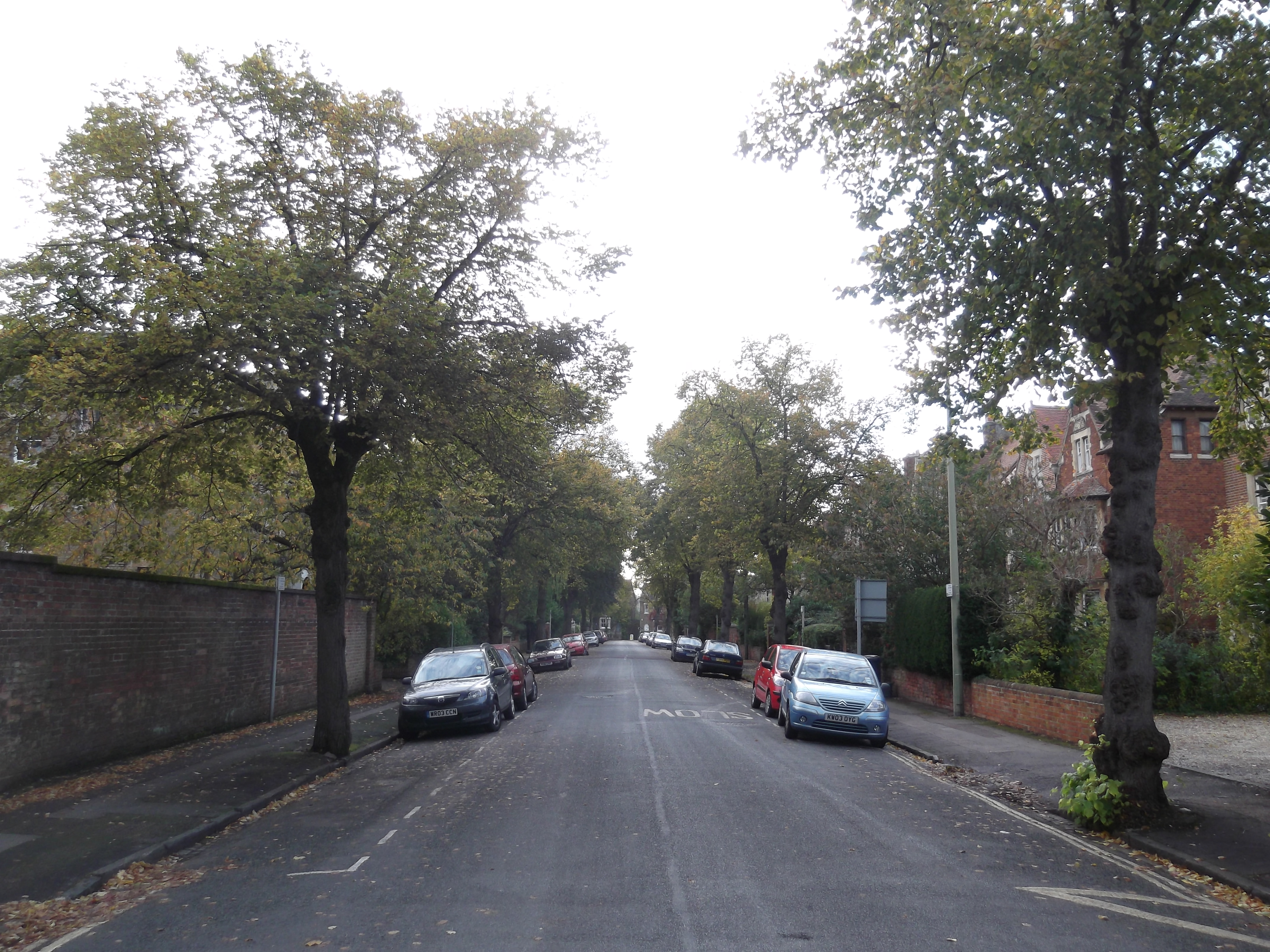
View west along St Margaret's Road from the junction with Woodstock Road.

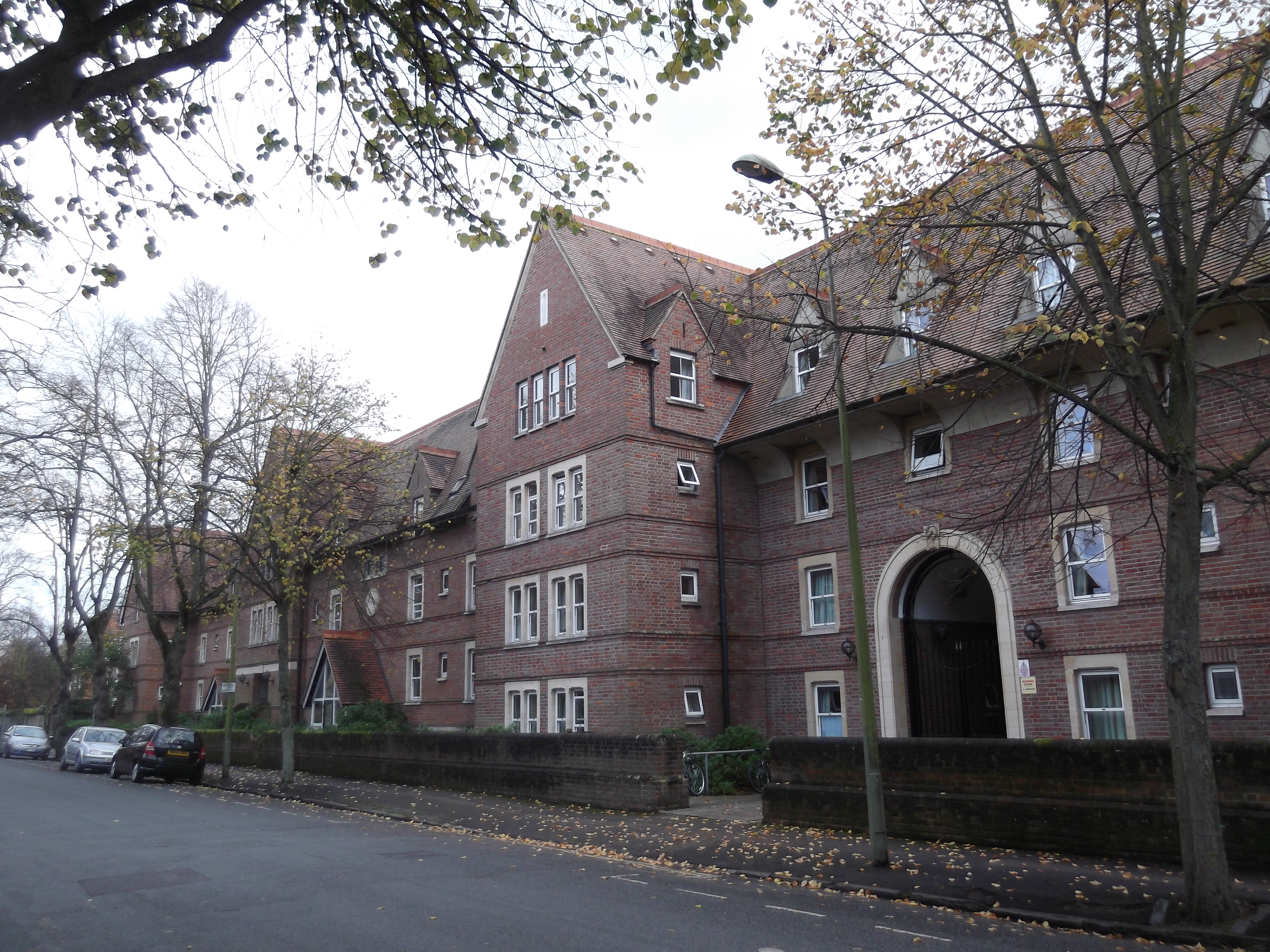
St Hugh's College buildings on the south side of St Margaret's Road.

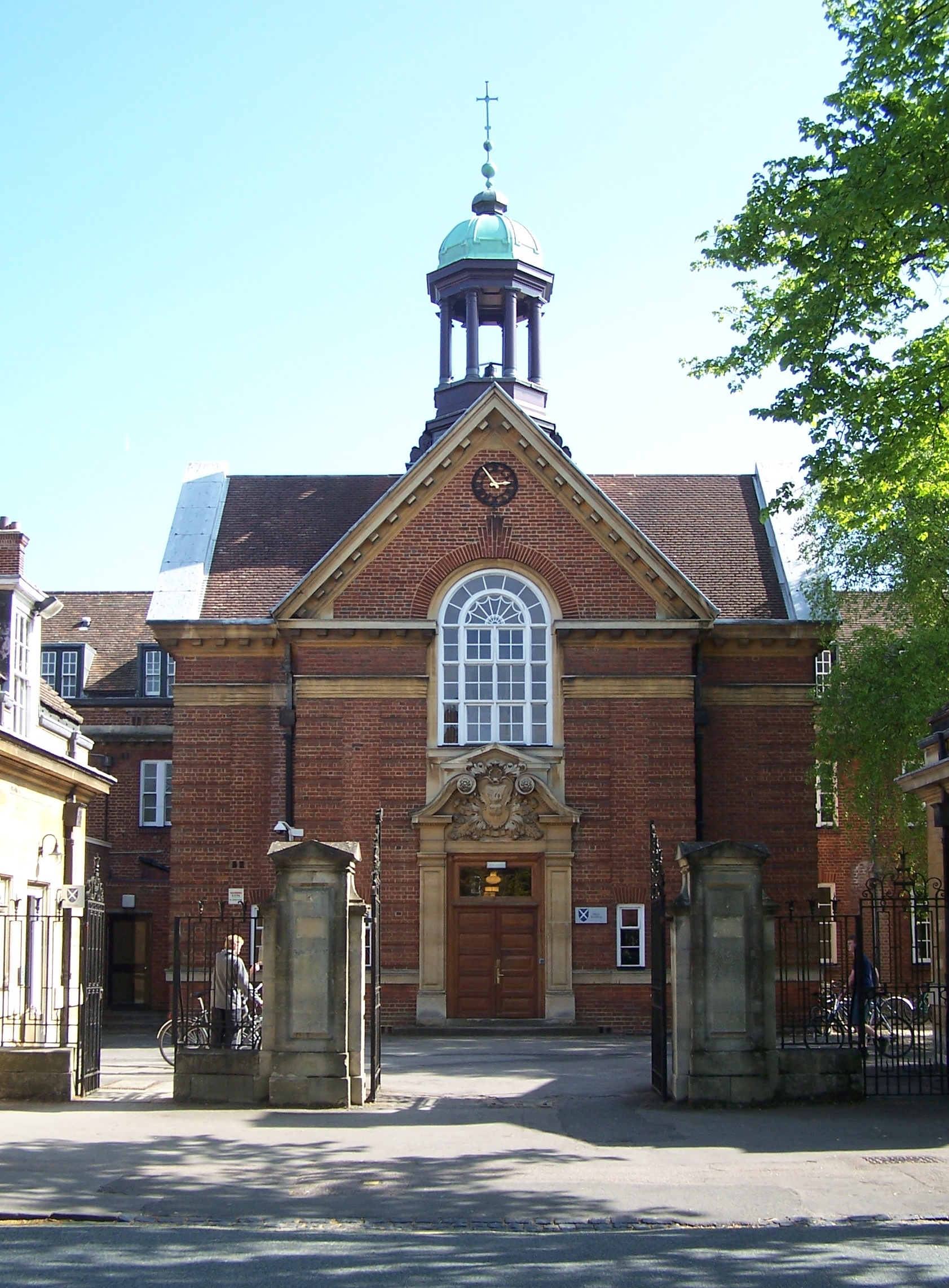
The main entrance of St Hugh's College on St Margaret's Road.
