= Daily Information =

British information sheet

Coordinates: 51.7480°N 1.2371°W

Daily Information (or Daily Info for short) is a printed information sheet in Oxford, England, displayed especially around the University colleges and departments, but also in local businesses. It has been in continuous existence since 28 September 1964, mostly as a brightly coloured A2 sheet, with premises originally in Warnborough Road, North Oxford. It provides information on events in and outside of Oxford, as well as reviews and small advertisements.

Daily Information used to be published daily, as its name implies, but now appears on Tuesdays and Fridays during both university term-time and the vacation. It was founded and then run for 40 years by John Rose (26 April 1925, Tunbridge Wells – 17 December 2004). Daily Info now has a regularly updated associated website from which the printed information is drawn.

== History ==
Daily Information was founded by John Rose in 1964. The first printed sheet was a single side of A4, simply showing the theatre and cinema listings for the week ahead, as well as offering information on placing announcements in further editions, news on "digs" and items "for sale".

On Daily Info's conception, Rose said:

"The need for an easy, immediate form of communication was also apparent in the Oxford of the early sixties. I tried to put an ad in the Oxford Mail. You couldn't put it in by phone, so I went down to their office in New Inn Hall St on Thursday afternoon. It was shut along with most other shops in Oxford – early closing day. Incidentally, the last weekday buses went about 10pm and the city was dead by quarter past. Back again on Friday. 'Could put it in on Monday afternoon, sir.' Fat lot of use that was. And it was expensive. Why not have our own publication and accept ads by phone and immediately? So we did."

== Format ==
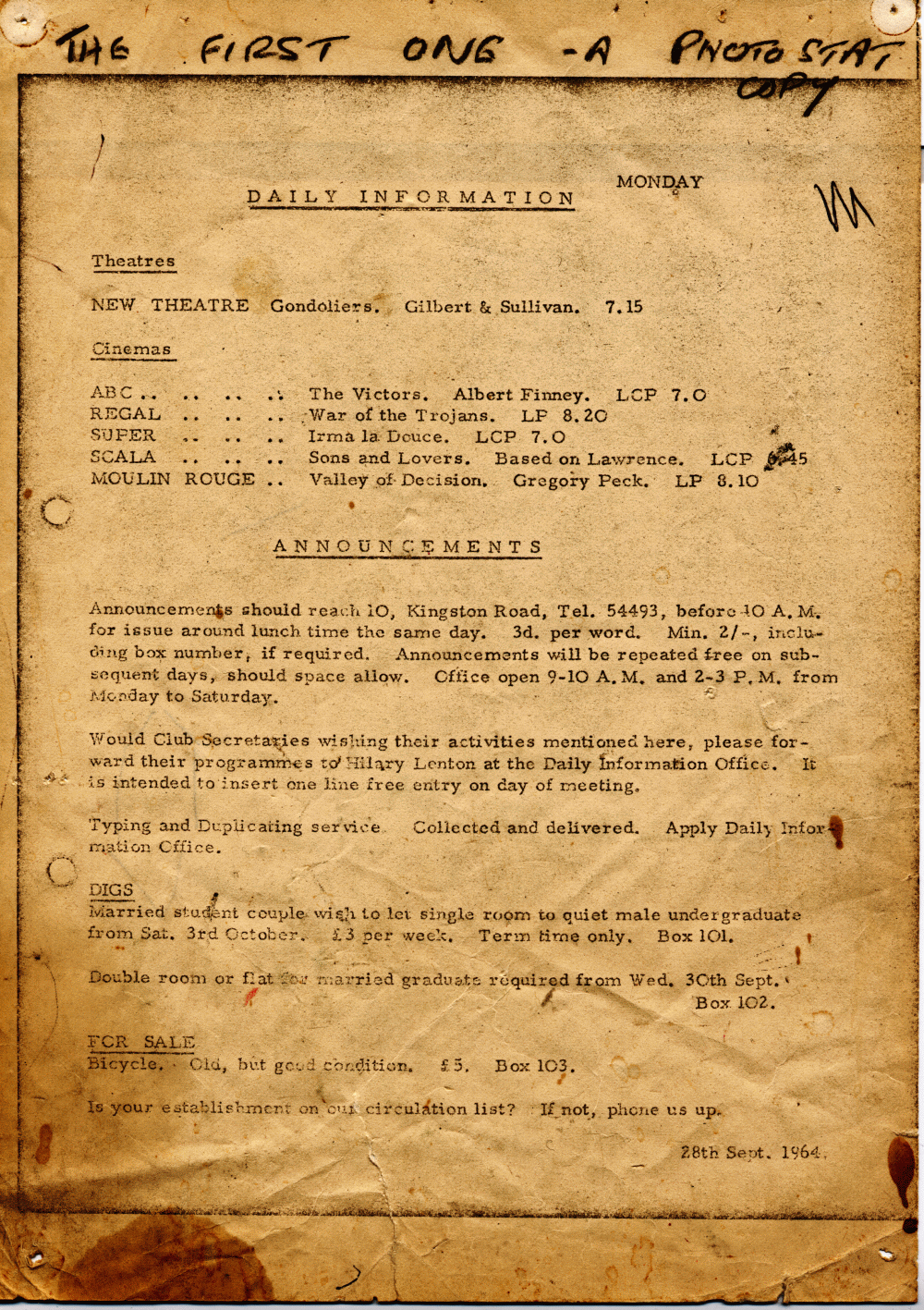

The Daily Information printed sheet takes the format of an A2 printed sheet, divided into categories such as "What's On", "Property", and "Jobs". It then divides into subsections, detailing cinema and theatre listings, lectures, jobs offered and wanted, among others.

It also prints specialized maps of Oxford, as well as a year planner and a printable calendar.

== Website ==
The Daily Info website (as it currently exists) first went live in 1995. Before that, it was run as a Wildcat! BBS service, where people could dial in with their modems.

The site provides extensive information on weekly events within and around Oxford, as well as reviews and advice on the local area.

== Oxcast ==
Since 2012, Daily Info has featured a podcast exploring different cultural aspects of Oxford.

Past topics and interviewees include:

- Oxjam (2014)
- the Oxford International Arts Fair (2015)
- the Oxford Human Rights Fair (2015)
- Oxford Pride (2015)
- Museum of Oxford (2015)
- Darwin Deez (2015)

== See also ==
- Cherwell, a student newspaper
