= Pullens Lane =

Road in Headington, east Oxford, England

Coordinates: 51°45′32″N 1°13′37″W

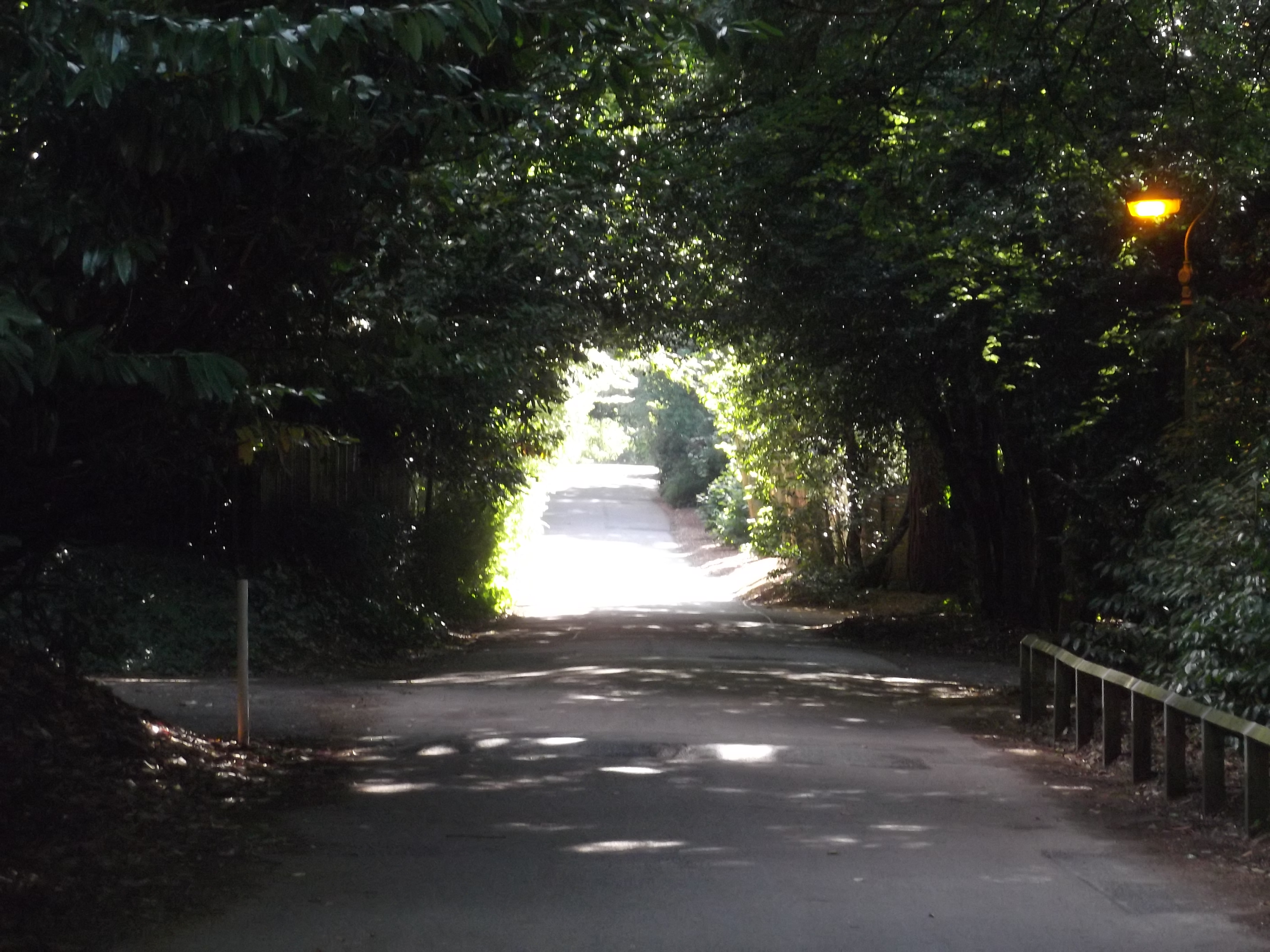
View south along the leafy Pullens Lane

Pullens Lane (a.k.a. Pullen's Lane) is in Headington, east Oxford, England. It is located at the top of Headington Hill, leading north off Headington Road to Jack Straw's Lane and Harberton Mead. The cul-de-sac Pullens Field (a.k.a. Pullen's Field, named in 1972) leads off west from Pullens Lane.

== History ==
The lane was named after the Rev. Josiah Pullen (1631–1714), vicar of St Peter-in-the-East in central Oxford (where he is buried) and Vice-President of Magdalen Hall. He used to walk in this area to the top of Headington Hill and admire the view of Oxford. He planted an elm tree in the locality in about 1680. The tree became known as Joe Pullen's tree, but was destroyed by a fire on 13 October 1909. There is a tablet in the wall of Davenport House here recording the event on the east side of the lane. The road was named Pullen's Lane in 1930.

== Buildings ==
Pullens Lane includes a number of notable buildings, especially by the Victorian architect Harry Wilkinson Moore (1850–1915). Buildings by Wilkinson include:

- The Vines, occupied by Scholarship & Christianity in Oxford (SCIO), previously The Vineyard and Pollock House, built in 1889–90.
- Cotuit Hall, part of the EF International Academy's Oxford campus, until 2011 one of the halls of residence at Oxford Brookes University, and previously known as Napier House, built in 1892.

Other buildings include:

- Pullen's Gate (previously known as Brockless Cottage and Brockleaze), formerly owned by Francis John Lys (1863–1947), Provost of Worcester College, Oxford and Vice-Chancellor of Oxford University.
- Headington Hill Hall, designed by John Thomas, built in 1824 (extended 1856–8), and owned by the Morrell's brewery family, now leased by Oxford Brookes University.

== Educational institutions ==
Rye St Antony School, founded in 1930, is located in Pullens Lane. It started in central Oxford and moved to a 12-acre (49,000 m^{2}) site on the east side of Pullens Lane in 1939.

Plater College moved from makeshift facilities at Boars Hill south of Oxford to a new purpose-built residential college on Pullens Lane, after demolishing Fairfield (previously known as The Pullens) during the 1970s, under the leadership of Joseph Kirwan (1910–2005). The college closed in 2005. The site is now occupied by the EF International Academy (formerly the EF International Language School).

== Gallery ==
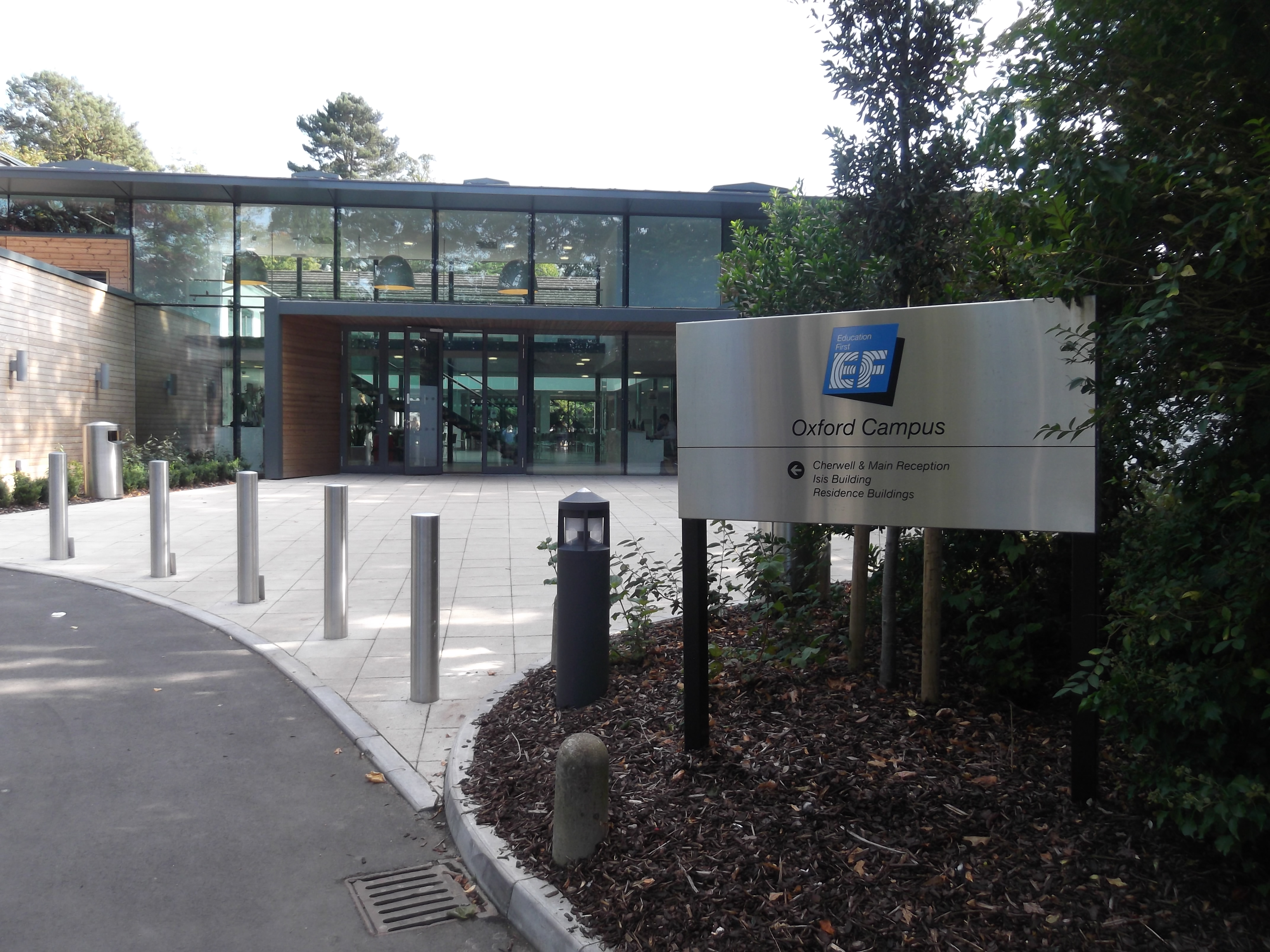
The EF International Language Centres Oxford Campus main entrance on Pullens Lane

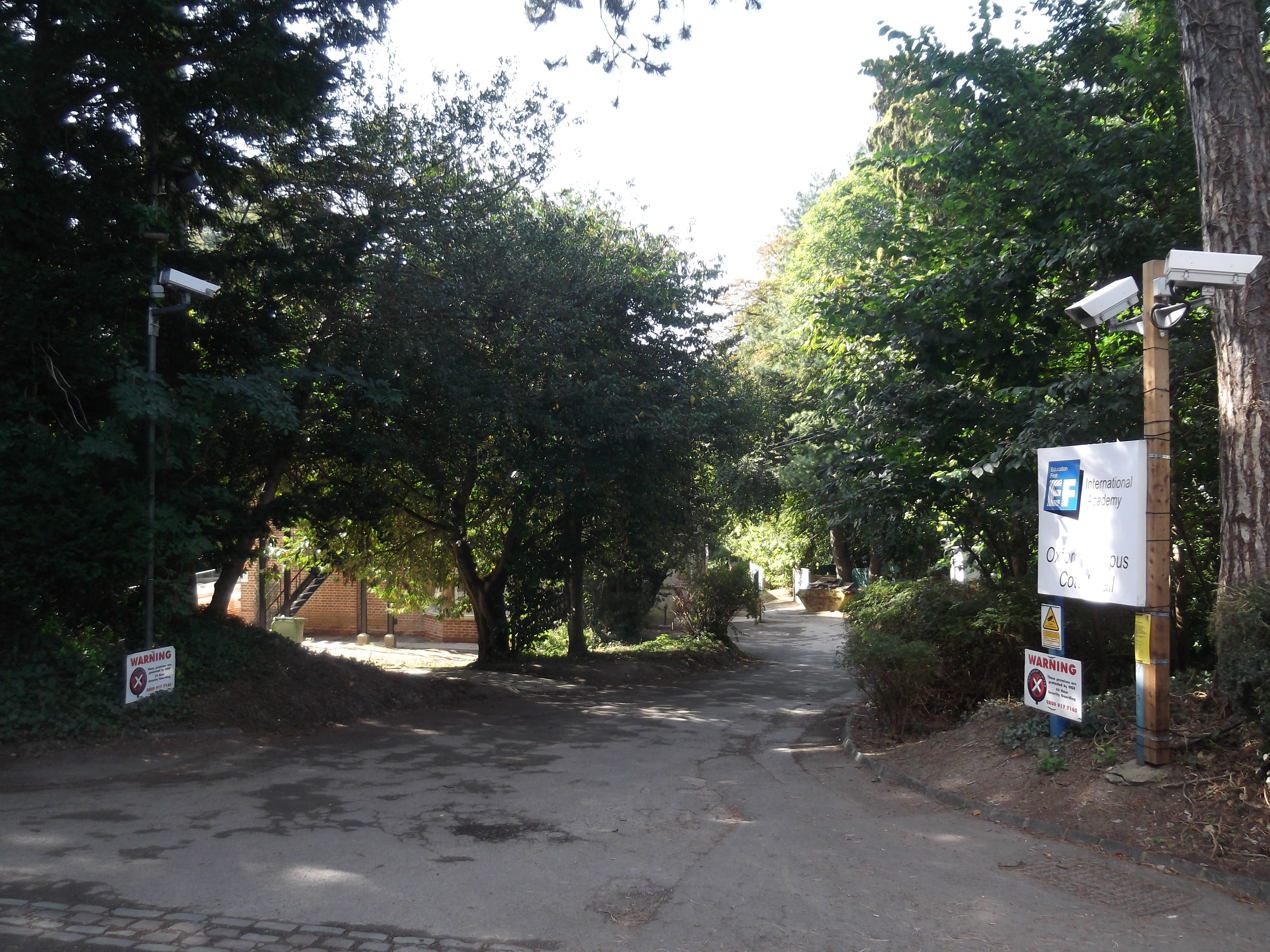
Entrance to Cotuit Hall, part of EF Academy, also on Pullens Lane

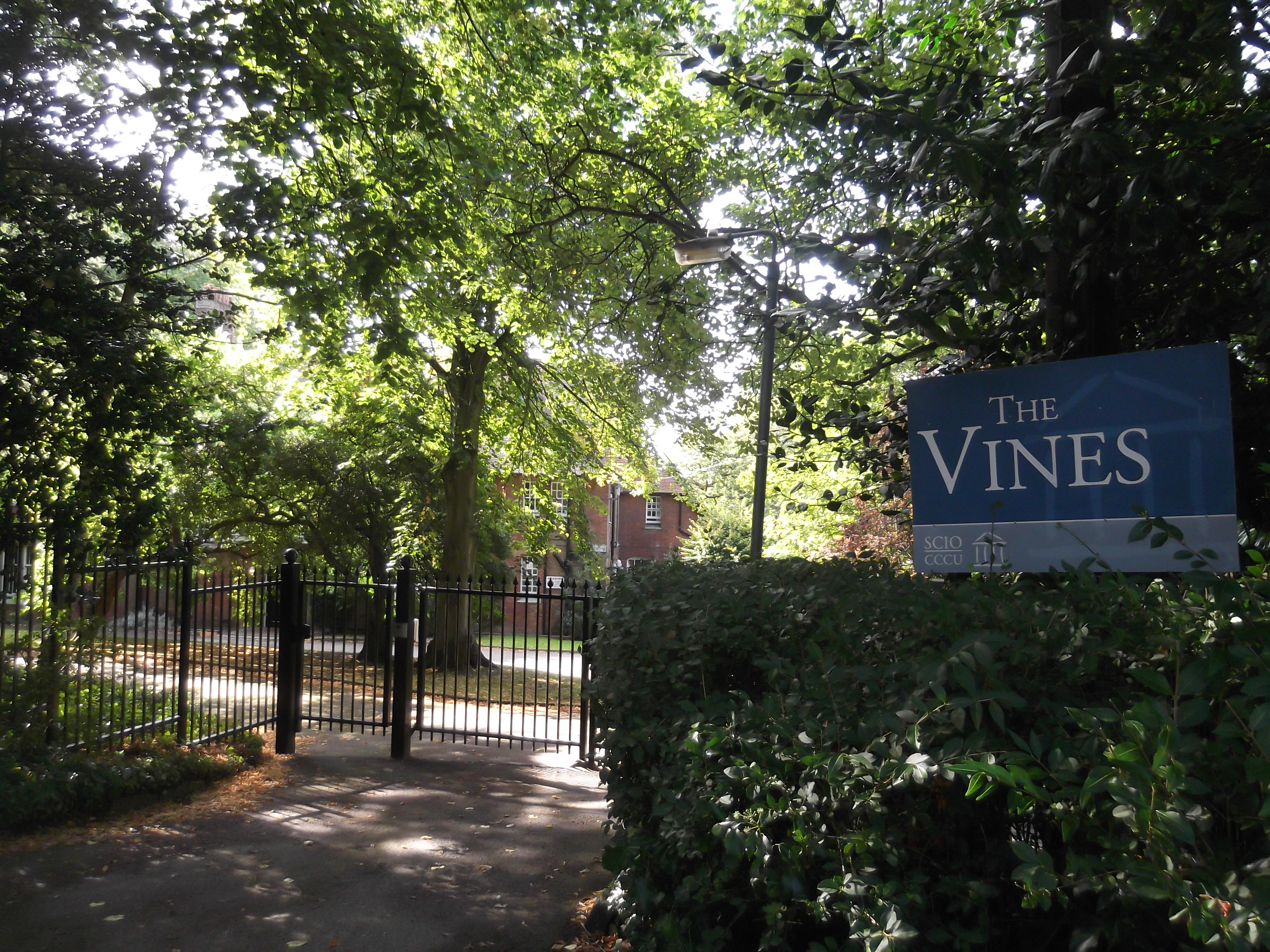
View through the main gate of The Vines on Pullens Lane

King House at Rye St Antony School, off Pullens Lane
