= Harry Drinkwater =

English architect (1844–1895)

- Born: 17 March 1844; Warwick, Warwickshire
- Died: 13 October 1895 (aged 51); Wokingham, Berkshire
- Occupation: Architect
- Buildings: New Theatre, Oxford; St Margaret's church, Oxford; St Augustine's church, Dudley
- Projects: The Lion Brewery, Oxford

Harry George Walter Drinkwater (1844–1895) was an English architect who practised in and around Oxford. His work included several churches and public houses.

== Life ==
Drinkwater was born in Warwick on 17 March 1844, the son of George Drinkwater, a coachman, and his wife Eliza. At the time of the 1851 Census the family remained in Warwick. By 1860, however, they had relocated to Oxford, where his father became landlord of the George Inn at 33 Cornmarket Street.

In 1878 he married Rose Carr at St Mark's parish church, Maida Vale, London. The couple established their home at 1 Farndon Road, North Oxford. They had three children: Grace (born 1879), George (born 1880) and Ruth (born 1883). Their son George was educated at SS Philip and James Boys' School in Leckford Road, a building designed by Drinkwater and completed in 1879.

Drinkwater was active in Freemasonry, joining Alfred Lodge (340). In 1881 he was appointed Junior Deacon; by 1885 he had served as Worshipful Master and as Provincial Grand Senior Warden. He was also initiated into the Royal Arch Chapter and the Knights Templar, and became a Worshipful Master of the Royal Mark Master Masons.

In 1895 Drinkwater's health declined, and he travelled to Wokingham, Berkshire, in the hope of recovery. He died there on Sunday 13 October 1895. His funeral took place in Oxford on Wednesday 16 October, and he was interred in St Sepulchre's Cemetery, Oxford.

He was survived by his widow and their three children. His son George pursued a career in architecture and was also active as a painter. Rose Drinkwater died in 1926 at her residence, 67A St Giles', Oxford, and was buried alongside her husband in St Sepulchre's Cemetery. Their nephew, John Drinkwater, later became known as a poet and playwright.

== Career ==
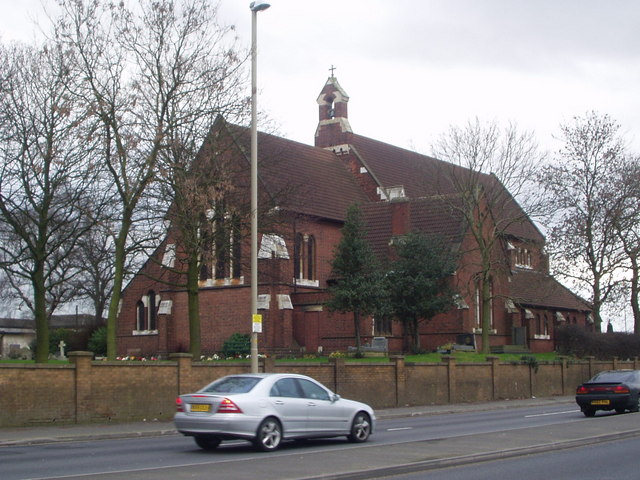
St Augustine's parish church, Dudley

Drinkwater was a pupil of William C. C. Bramwell in Oxford 1860–1865 and then assistant to the Gothic Revival architect G. E. Street 1865–1873. After a year as a travelling student and recipient of the Royal Academy travelling prize, Drinkwater began independent practice in Oxford and was made a Fellow of the Royal Institute of British Architects (FRIBA) in 1882. Drinkwater followed Street into designing and restoring Church of England churches and designing vicarages, but also undertook a number of commissions for Hanley's Morrell's and Weaving's breweries.

Drinkwater's brother Albert was involved in the New Theatre, Oxford. In 1885 Drinkwater bought shares in the Oxford Theatre Company. The New Theatre was demolished and in 1886 rebuilt to Drinkwater's designs. However, it was demolished and rebuilt again in 1933.

== Work ==
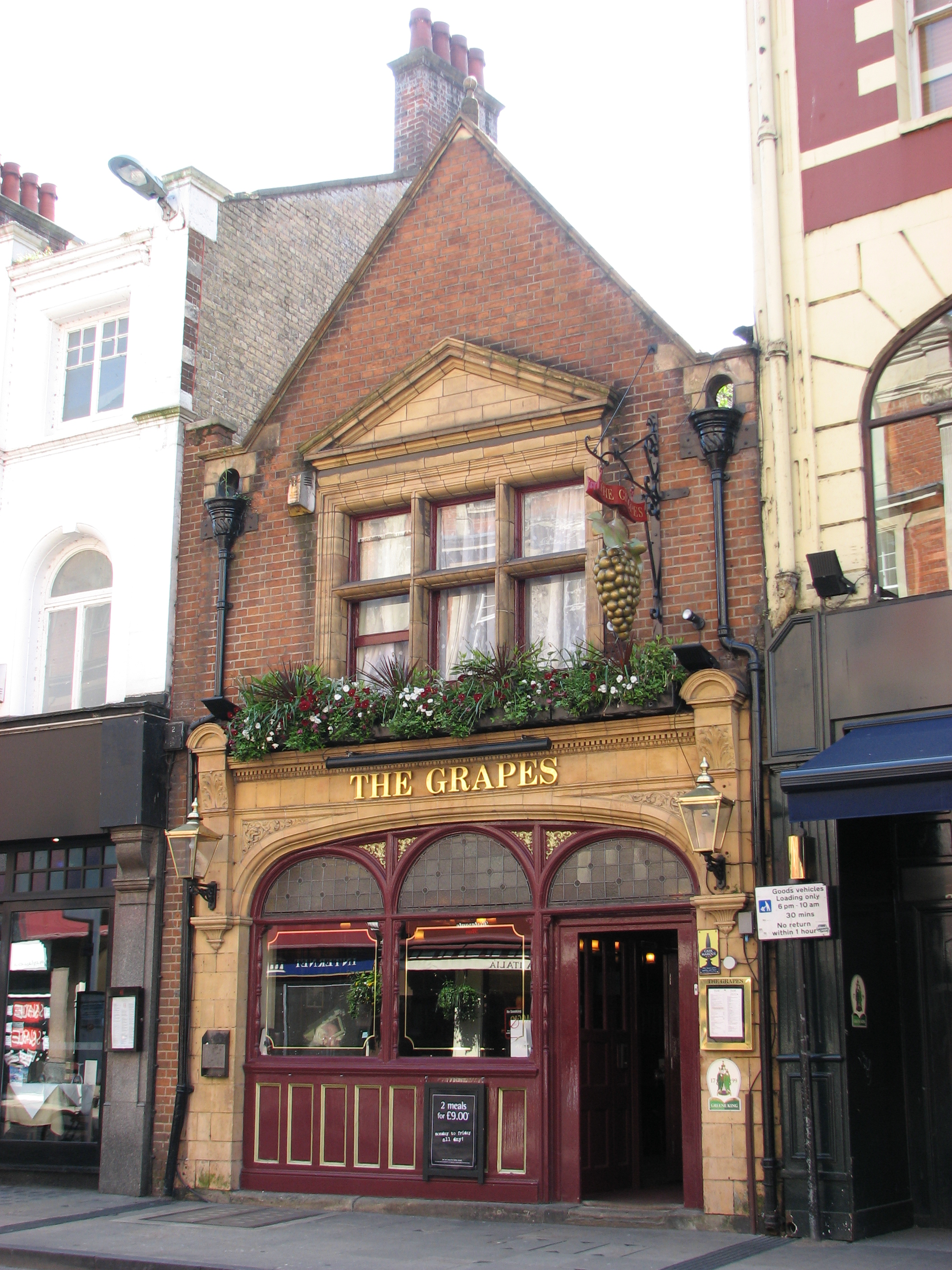
The Grapes pub, George Street, Oxford

- St Frideswide's Vicarage, New Osney, Oxford (undated)
- SS Philip and James Boys' School, Leckford Road, Oxford, 1879
- Lion Brewery, Oxford, 1879–1901
- St Margaret's parish church, Walton Manor, Oxford, 1883–93
- St Augustine's parish church, Dudley, Worcestershire, 1884
- St James' parish church, Aston, Oxfordshire: alterations, 1885–1889
- New Theatre, Oxford, 1886 (demolished and replaced by new building in 1933)
- SS Philip and James old vicarage, 68 Woodstock Road, Oxford, 1886–87 (now part of St Antony's College, Oxford)
- St Andrew's parish church, Priestwood, Bracknell, Berkshire, 1888 (demolished c. 1989)
- Hanley's Brewery, Oxford: square room and stores, 30 Pembroke Street, Oxford (now Modern Art Oxford)
- St Leonard's parish church, Eynsham, Oxfordshire: restoration, 1892
- WF Lucas's Clothing Factory, 59 George Street, Oxford, 1892
- Cape of Good Hope public house, The Plain, Oxford, 1892
- New Lodge, University Parks, Oxford, 1893
- The Anchor public house, Polstead Road, Oxford, 1893
- The Grapes public house, George Street, Oxford, 1894

== Sources ==
- Brodie, Antonia; Felstead, Alison; Franklin, Jonathan; Pinfield, Leslie, eds. (2001). Directory of British Architects 1834–1914, A–K. London and New York: Continuum. p. 562. ISBN 978-0-8264-5513-0.
- Pevsner, Nikolaus (1966). Berkshire. The Buildings of England. Harmondsworth: Penguin Books. pp. 93–94.
- Pevsner, Nikolaus (1974). Staffordshire. The Buildings of England. Harmondsworth: Penguin Books. p. 121. ISBN 0-14-071046-9.
- Sherwood, Jennifer; Pevsner, Nikolaus (1974). Oxfordshire. The Buildings of England. Harmondsworth: Penguin Books. p. 269. ISBN 0-14-071045-0.
- Tyack, Geoffrey (1998). Oxford An Architectural Guide. Oxford and New York: Oxford University Press. p. 269. ISBN 0-19-817423-3.
- Woolley, Liz (2010). "Industrial Architecture in Oxford, 1870 to 1914". Oxoniensia. LXXV. Oxfordshire Architectural and Historical Society: 79, 83, 88. ISSN 0308-5562.
