= Cotuit Hall =

Coordinates: 51.7603°N 1.2270°W

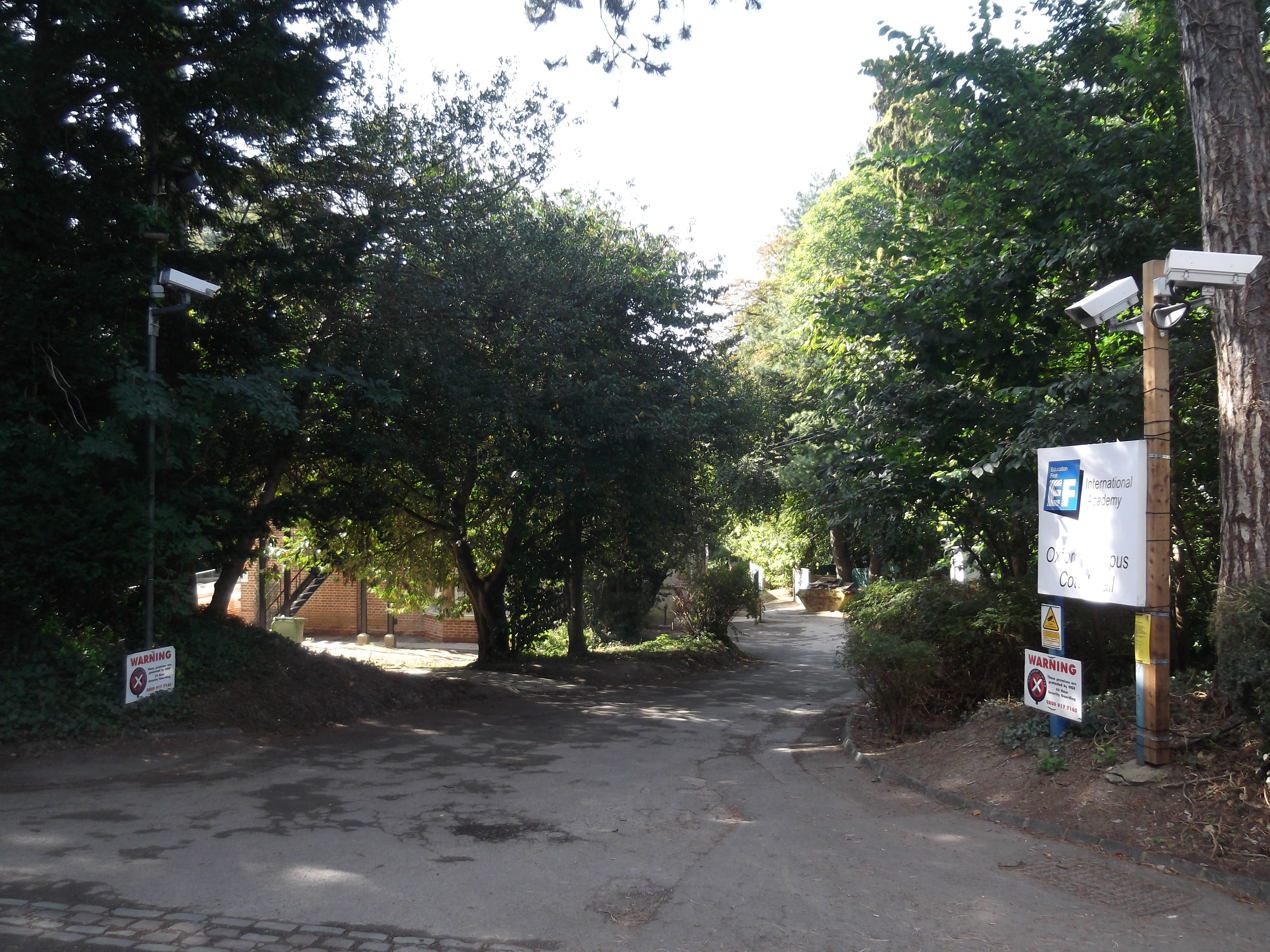
Entrance to Cotuit Hall on Pullens Lane

Cotuit Hall is part of the EF International Academy's campus in Oxford, England. Until 2011 it was one of the halls of residence at Oxford Brookes University.

== History ==
The hall was originally named Napier House after its commissioner and first occupant, Arthur Sampson Napier. A fellow of Merton College and professor of English language and literature, he employed the architect Harry Wilkinson Moore to design a house for himself, his wife, their six children and four servants.

The house was to be built on land he had recently purchased in Pullen's Lane at the top of Headington Hill, an area of growing favour among Oxford academics. The house was completed in 1892, and Napier lived there with his family until his death in 1916.

Napier House was then bought at auction by Headington School, who used the building to house their junior department. In 1930, the senior school moved into new buildings, and the junior section moved into its current location on the south side of London Road (where the senior school had previously been). The name of Napier House moved with the school.

The building, thus vacated, reverted for a time to being a private dwelling, and was given its current name of Cotuit Hall. The origin of the name is uncertain: Cotuit is the name of a village in Cape Cod, Massachusetts.

In this period, it was occupied by Redvers Opie, fellow and tutor in Economics at Magdalen College. From the 1940s until 1958, Cotuit Hall was the City of Oxford Children's Home, which relocated to Windmill rd, Headington to become Windmill House.

In the late 1950s, it again became a private house, occupied by the Reverend D. B. Jones, but by 1962 it had become a Hostel of the College of Technology, which later became the Polytechnic and then Oxford Brookes University.

In 2011 it was sold by Oxford Brookes University to the EF International Academy, who use it for students aged 16–18 taking two-year A-level or International Baccalaureate residential courses.
