= Farndon Road =

Road in North Oxford, England

Coordinates: 51.7657°N 1.2673°W

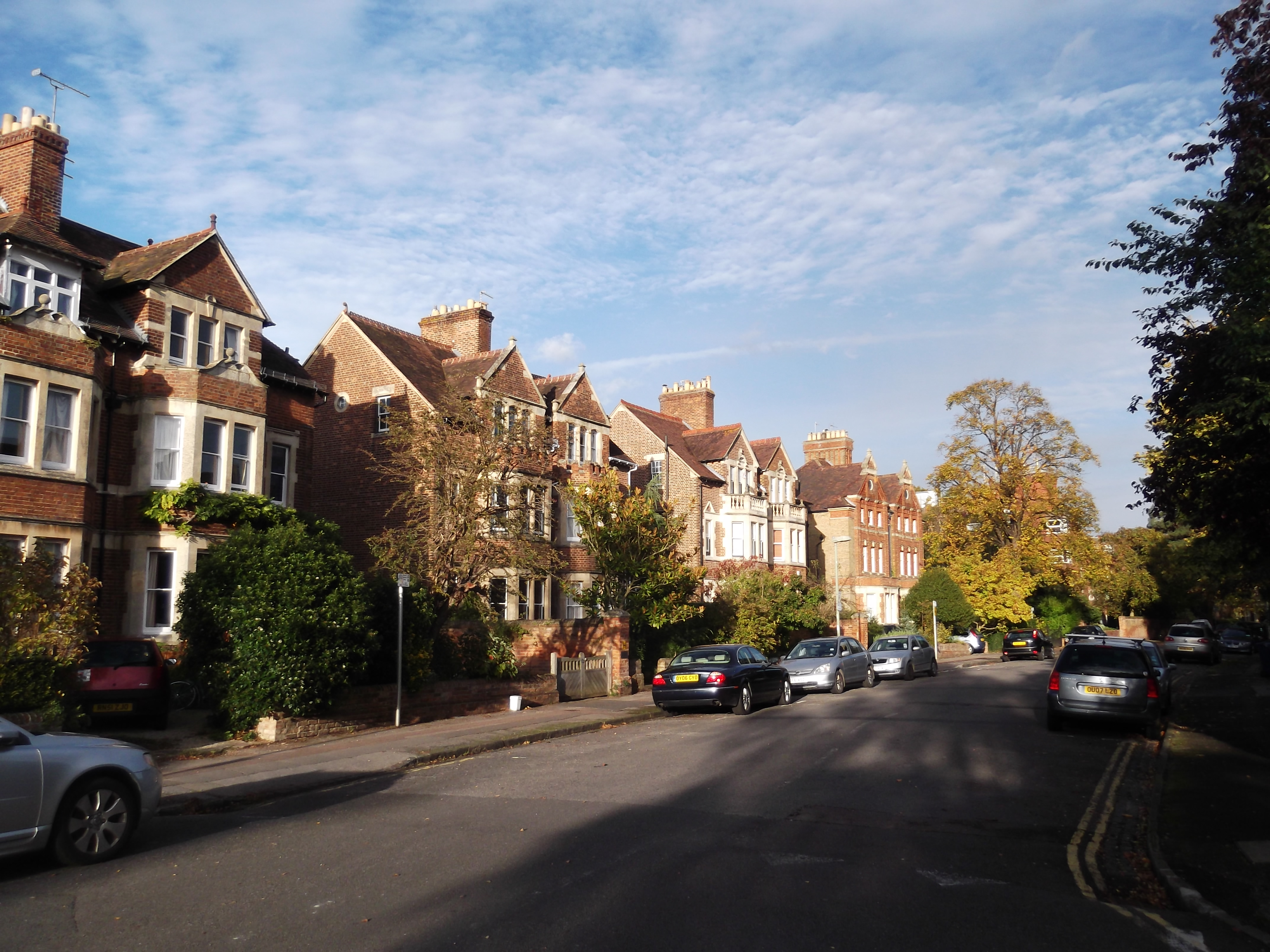
View east from the junction with Warnborough Road.

Farndon Road is a residential road in North Oxford, England.

At the western end of the road is a junction with Kingston Road and Southmoor Road continues opposite. At the eastern end is a junction with Woodstock Road (A4144), a major arterial road out of Oxford to the north, with St Hugh's College opposite. Warnborough Road leads south midway along the road to Leckford Road. To the north, St Margaret's Road is parallel with Farndon Road.

The area where Farndon Road is located in Walton Manor was originally owned by St John's College, Oxford. Before its development for residential use, there a railway station here for the Oxford, Worcester and Wolverhampton Railway was proposed, but was not built. Houses in the road were first leased by the college between 1879 and 1887. Nos 10, 11, 25, and 26 were designed by the architect William Wilkinson. Nos 1–5 are by John Galpin and George Shirley and nos 18–25 are by William Wilkinson and Harry Wilkinson Moore. The houses are in a late Victorian style, semi-detached, and of substantial brick construction. A number were built by the builder John Money, who himself leased 26 Farndon Road.

The Alexandra Residential Club had a building on the northern corner of Farndon Road at 133 Woodstock Road that was built to provide affordable accommodation for about 100 young women studying or working in Oxford. It was opened by Princess Alexandra in 1971, hence the name. It was run by the YWCA until 2001 when the building was sold and renamed. The 97-room block was bought by Catalyst in 2001, with the condition that it remain as a women-only flats for at least 10 years. It was sold to Oxford University in 2020 with no such condition, and in 2021 the building became graduate student housing for members of Reuben College.

1 Farndon Road was the home of the architect Harry Drinkwater until his death in 1895 and of the urban planner and writer Thomas Sharp in the 20th century. The poet Lee Gerlach wrote a poem Sharp's Oxford, #1 Farndon Road.
