= George Arnett =

Canadian football player

Profile
- Position: Tackle

Personal information
- Born: c. 1928; Toronto, Ontario, Canada
- Died: October 25, 1992 (aged 63–64); Toronto, Ontario, Canada
- Listed height: 6 ft 3 in (1.91 m)
- Listed weight: 240 lb (109 kg)

Career history
- 1951–1953: Toronto Argonauts
- 1954–1957: Hamilton Tiger-Cats
- 1958–1958: Ottawa Rough Riders

Awards and highlights
- Grey Cup champion (1957)

George Arnett (c. 1928 – October 25, 1992) was a Canadian professional football player who played for the Toronto Argonauts, Hamilton Tiger-Cats, and Ottawa Rough Riders. He won the Grey Cup with Hamilton in 1957. He previously played football at and attended McMaster University. He died in 1992.
