= Oxford Spires Academy =

Location
- Glanville Road; Oxford, Oxfordshire, OX4 2AU; England
- Coordinates: 51°44′36″N 1°13′16″W

Information
- Type: Secondary Academy
- Motto: Be the Best You Can Be
- Established: January 2011
- Local authority: Oxfordshire
- Specialist: English language, Business and Enterprise College
- Department for Education URN: 136261 Tables
- Ofsted: Reports
- Principal: Louise Cowley
- Gender: Coeducational
- Age: 11 to 18
- Enrolment: 1,087
- Colours: purple, yellow
- Website: http://www.oxfordspiresacademy.org/

Oxford Spires Academy is a state funded secondary school for children aged 11–18 in Glanville Road, East Oxford, England formerly known as Oxford Community School and The Oxford School. Formerly sponsored by the CfBT Education Trust it is currently part of the Anthem Schools Trust.

The school has a co-educational student body of 1,087, and has specialist Business and Enterprise College status. The student body is drawn from across the city, though most pupils are from the Cowley, Rose Hill, East Oxford, Donnington, and Blackbird Leys areas of the city.

== History ==
The school was originally established in 1966, following a merger between Southfield Grammar School and the City of Oxford High School for Boys, taking over Southfield Grammar School's Glanville Road site. The school was a single-sex grammar school for boys until 1972, when it became comprehensive, taking the first intake in September of that year. Entry also changed from aged 11 to aged 13 with the introduction of Middle Schools in Oxford. A reform of the educational system in the City of Oxford in the 1990s saw the school become coeducational. In 2003 the school changed from a 14-19 Upper School to an 11-19 Secondary School due to the City of Oxford Reorganisation. In 2005 the school gained Business and Enterprise status, providing extra funding for a state of the art conference centre. In 2006, the school recorded its best ever GCSE results. At the beginning of 2008 Oxford Community School became a Foundation School. The school has achieved Green Flag Eco-School Status.

At the start of 2011 the school reopened as Oxford Spires Academy. A new uniform was chosen and school took on a distinctive purple colour theme both in uniform and on the site itself. The uniform also included colour coordinated ties for the house system Bannister, Earhart, Seacole and Tolkien house. The houses each bear the name of a noteworthy figure from throughout history; Bannister is named after Sir Roger Bannister, Earhart after Amelia Earhart, Seacole after Mary Seacole and Tolkien after J.R.R. Tolkien.

Ofsted undertook a monitoring inspection of Oxford Spires Academy in April 2012 and determined that Oxford Spires Academy had made good progress towards raising standards. This was confirmed in Summer 2012 when Oxford Spires Academy achieved outstanding GCSE results. 78% of students achieved 5 or more A*-C grades and 57% students achieved 5 or more A*-C grades including English and Mathematics.

In 2014 the Oxford Mail reported allegations that Spires had excluded many of its least able students to bolster its external exam results, and therefore its standing in school league tables.

Sue Croft, the first principal of Oxford Spires Academy, retired at the end of the 2016-17 academic year. Her successor, Marianne Blake, took up post in September 2017, before being replaced by Jon Hebblethwaite in September 2021. Hebblethwaite left after one year and was replaced by Rich Corry

Ofsted undertook a short inspection of Oxford Spires Academy in November 2017 and determined that the school continued to be good.

On March 23, 2018, Oxford Spires Academy closed down that Friday after a suspicious email demanded $5,000 or a bomb would be detonated, after a search of the school involving police officers and staff, nothing was found, so the situation was noted as a hoax bomb threat. Many other schools across the country had also been targeted by similar threats, possibly coming from the United States, though it is unknown if the Oxford Spires bomb threat and the other hoax bomb threats were linked. On March 13, 2019, the school went into a lockdown for over an hour after an intruder was seen around the school's perimeter, apparently holding a knife. Parents were informed of the ongoing situation at 2:49pm, which was resolved by the end of the school day. No one was harmed, nor was school property damaged during the incident.

The school became the subject of national news in late 2020 after Head of Sixth Form Jacqueline Watson informed pupils that period pain was not a valid excuse for taking time off school.

== Notable alumni ==
Notable former pupils include Garry Parker (professional footballer with Nottingham Forest and Leicester City), and Jermaine McSporran (professional footballer with Wycombe Wanderers, Doncaster Rovers, and Chester City).

Notable alumni of the former Southfield Grammar School include composer Bryan Kelly, horticulturalist John Mattock, actor Patrick Mower, and priest David Shreeve.
