= Harry Wilkinson Moore =

- Born: 1850
- Died: 1915
- Occupation: Architect
- Awards: AA Silver Medal, 1879

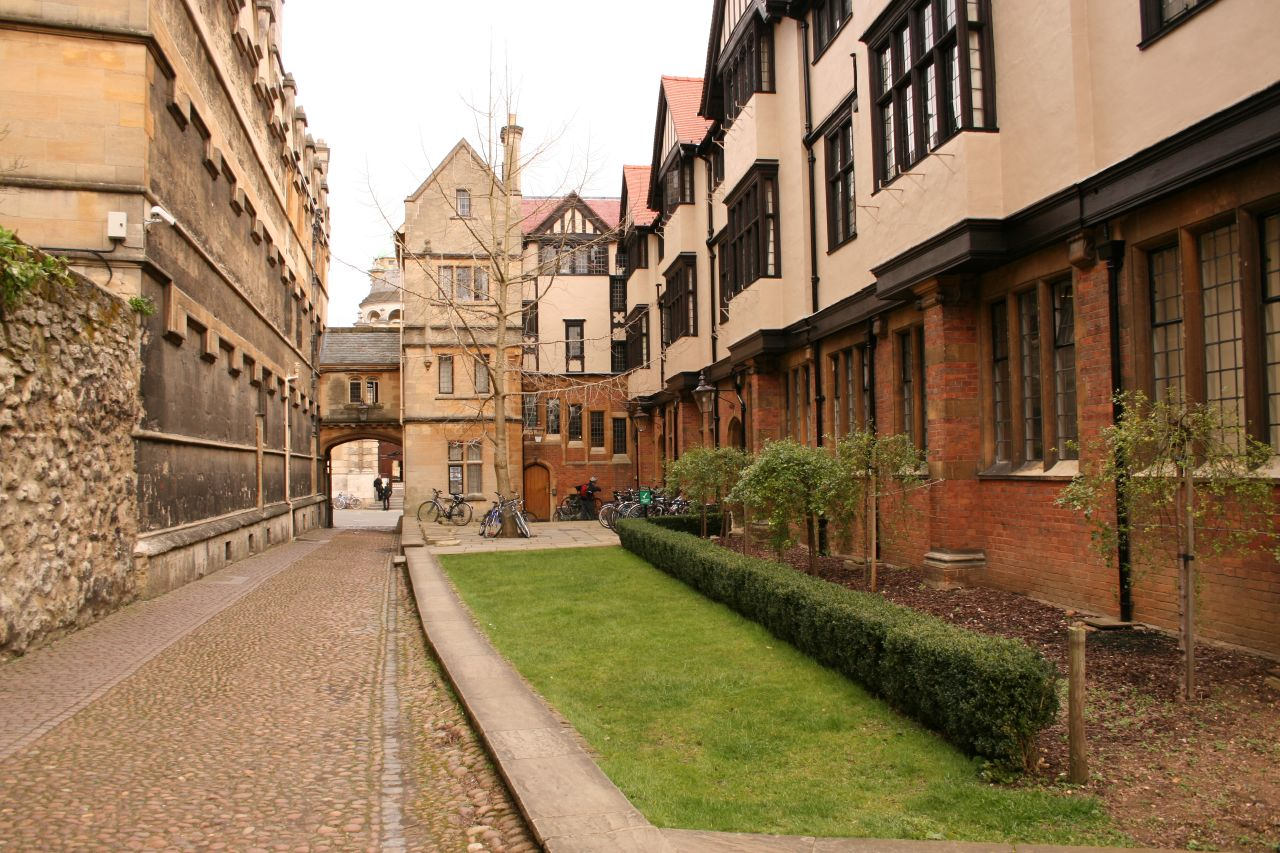
View along Logic Lane in University College, Oxford towards H.W. Moore's covered bridge on the High Street

Harry Wilkinson Moore, FRIBA (1850–1915) was a Victorian and Edwardian architect. He was the son of Arthur Moore (1814–1873) and Mary Wilkinson (1821–1904), and a nephew of the architects George Wilkinson and William Wilkinson.

== Career ==
Moore was a pupil of William Wilkinson in 1872 and assistant to Alfred Waterhouse in 1878. Moore was in partnership with William Wilkinson from 1881. Moore was made a Fellow of the Royal Institute of British Architects in 1888.

== Works ==
Moore designed a number of notable buildings in Oxford. His works include:

- Park Building (1885-1895), a building of Somerville College, Oxford.
- The drinking fountain on the corner of Walton Well Road and Southmoor Road
- The Vineyard (1889–90), also known as Pollock House and now The Vines, on Pullens Lane in Headington.
- Napier House (1892), now Cotuit Hall, also on Pullens Lane, now a hall of residence for EF Academy, Oxford.
- Durham Buildings, University of Oxford (1902)
- Logic Lane covered bridge (1904) over Logic Lane at University College, Oxford.

He also designed many houses in North Oxford, including in the following roads: Banbury Road, Bardwell Road, Chalfont Road, Farndon Road, Frenchay Road, Hayfield Road, Kingston Road, Linton Road, Northmoor Road, Polstead Road, Rawlinson Road, St Margaret's Road, Southmoor Road, Walton Well Road, and Woodstock Road.

== Sources ==
- Brodie, Antonia; Felstead, Alison; Franklin, Jonathan; Pinfield, Leslie, eds. (2001). Directory of British Architects 1834–1914. Vol. L–Z. London & New York: Continuum. p. 203. ISBN 082645514X.
- Hinchcliffe, Tanis (1992). North Oxford. New Haven & London: Yale University Press. pp. 215–243 (Appendix: Gazetter). ISBN 0-14-071045-0.
- Saint, Andrew (1970). "Three Oxford Architects" (PDF). Oxoniensia. XXXV. Oxford Architectural and Historical Society: 53–102.
- Sherwood, Jennifer; Pevsner, Nikolaus (1974). Oxfordshire. The Buildings of England. Harmondsworth: Penguin Books. ISBN 0-14-071045-0.
- Tyack, Geoffrey (1998). Oxford An Architectural Guide. Oxford & New York: Oxford University Press. ISBN 0-19-817423-3.
