= Pendant vault =

Type of vaulting in late Gothic architecture

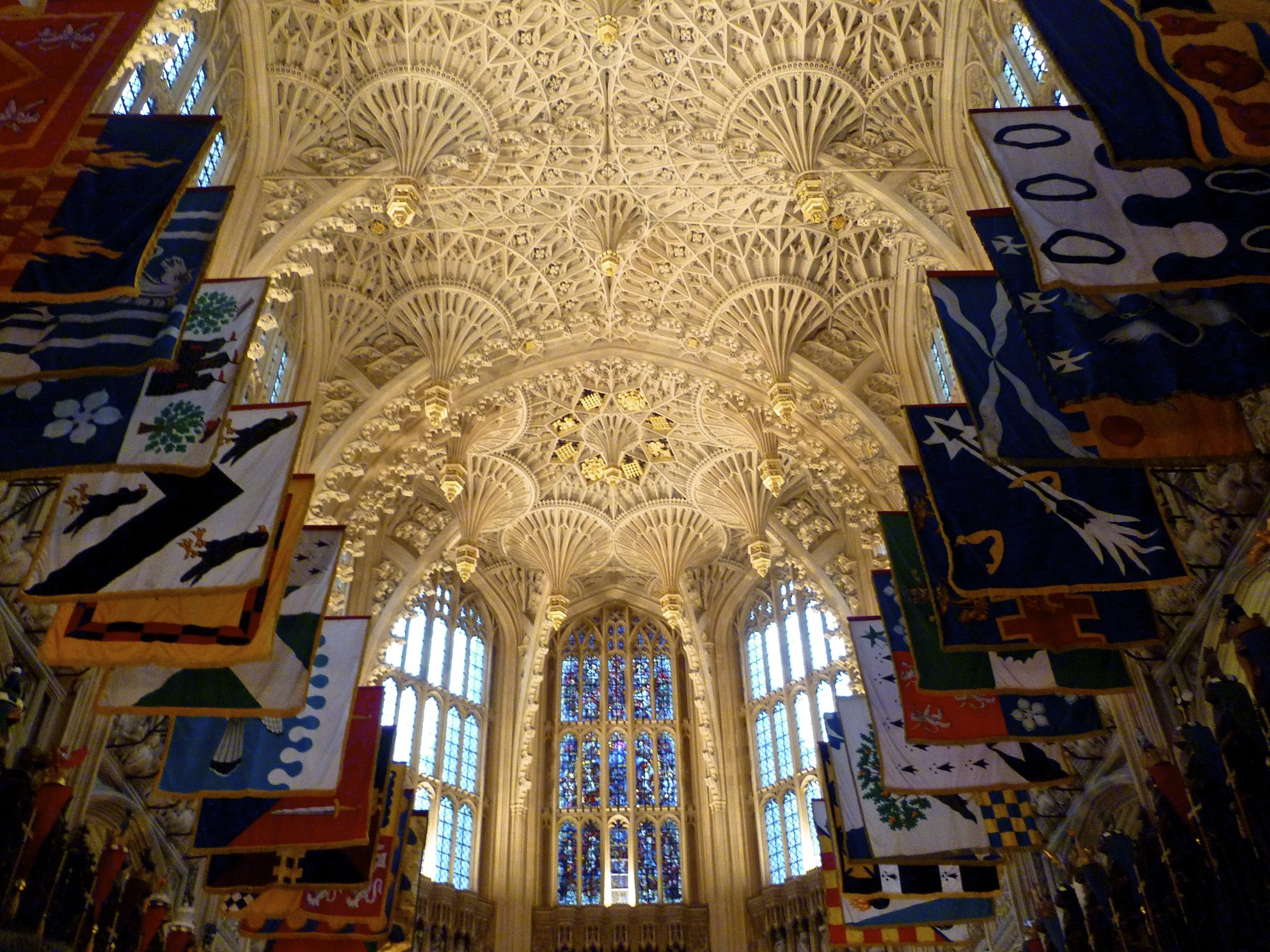
Pendant fan vault of Henry VII's chapel at Westminster Abbey.

Pendant vaulting is a form of Gothic vaulting in which large decorative pendants hang from the vault at a distance from the walls. In some cases, the pendants are a large form of boss. It is particularly associated with Late Gothic architecture of the 15th and 16th centuries, i.e. Perpendicular Gothic in England and Flamboyant Gothic in France.

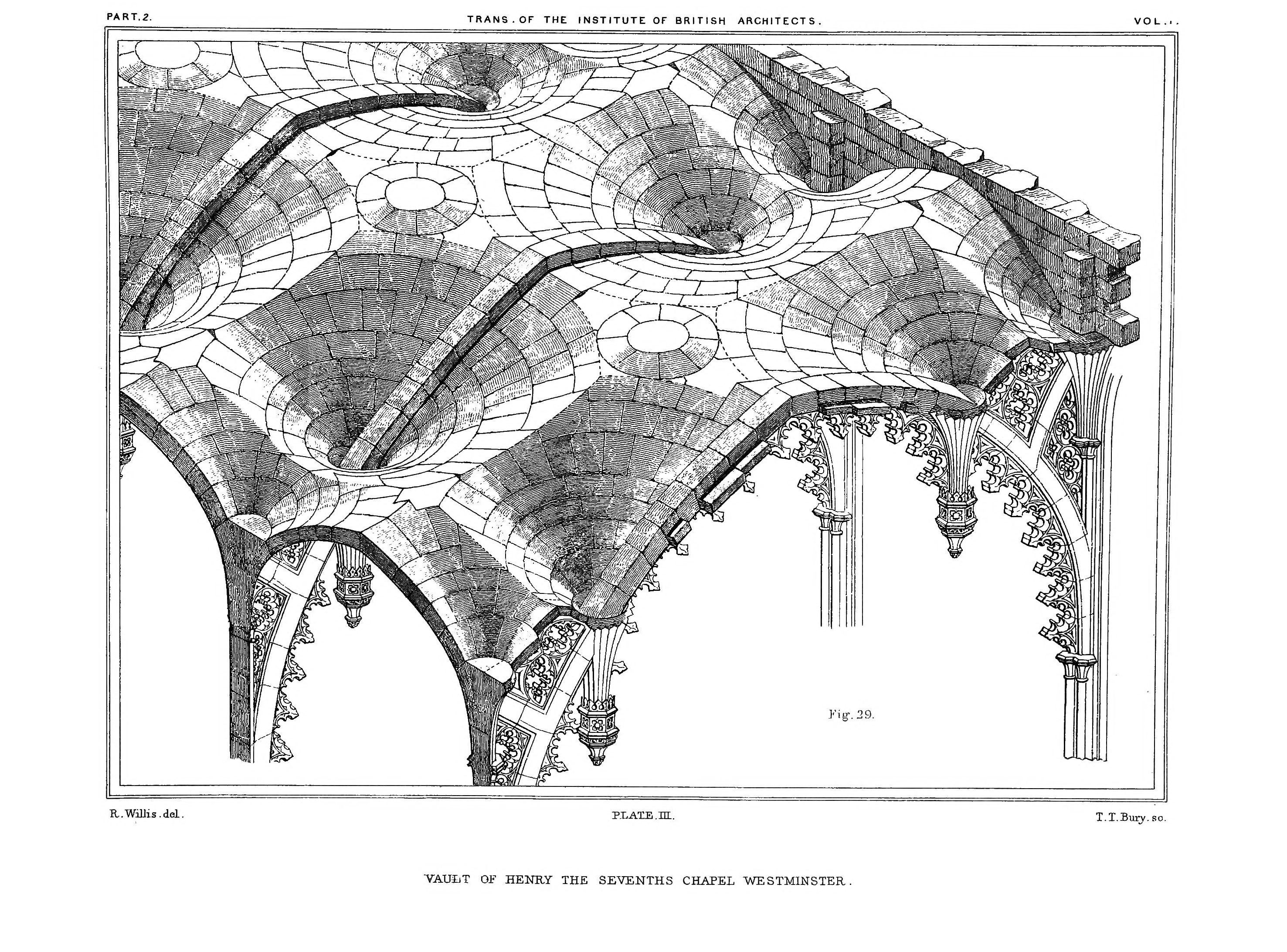
The reverse of the vault at Henry VII's Chapel, showing the concealed arches, drawn by Robert Willis.

== Structure ==
There are several forms of pendant vault, based on the type of vault to which the pendants are applied, and where in the vault the pendants sit. All forms of vault: quadripartite, tierceron, lierne and fan, may be adapted as the basis for a pendant vault. In the majority of pendant vaults, the pendant is simply an enlarged voussoir in one of the vaulting ribs. In this case, in English vaults the pendants are usually close to the side walls, while on the continent they may be at the vault ridge. Flying ribs are a variant of this form, where the visible ribs perform no structural function, while the weight of the vault is carried by secondary ribs. At some buildings, like Oxford Cathedral and Henry VII's Chapel in Westminster Abbey, the structural arch is partly concealed behind the surface of the vault.

Another form of pendant vaulting occurs where the entirety of the vault descends to a pendant. This is not possible in large masonry vaults, and so is confined to small vaults in features like tombs, where either the hanging section is lightweight enough to be carried on an iron tie, or the entire vault is cut from a single block of stone, i.e. is non-structural. A compromise form, where the vault appears to spring from the pendant but actually springs from a structural arch, was used in England for buildings like Henry VII's Chapel and the Divinity School, Oxford.

In pendant vaulting the form and ornamentation of the vault evolve as “pendants as elongated voussoirs are dropped from a constructive pointed arch, concealed above the vaulting, and form abutments to support the pendant conoids.”

== History ==
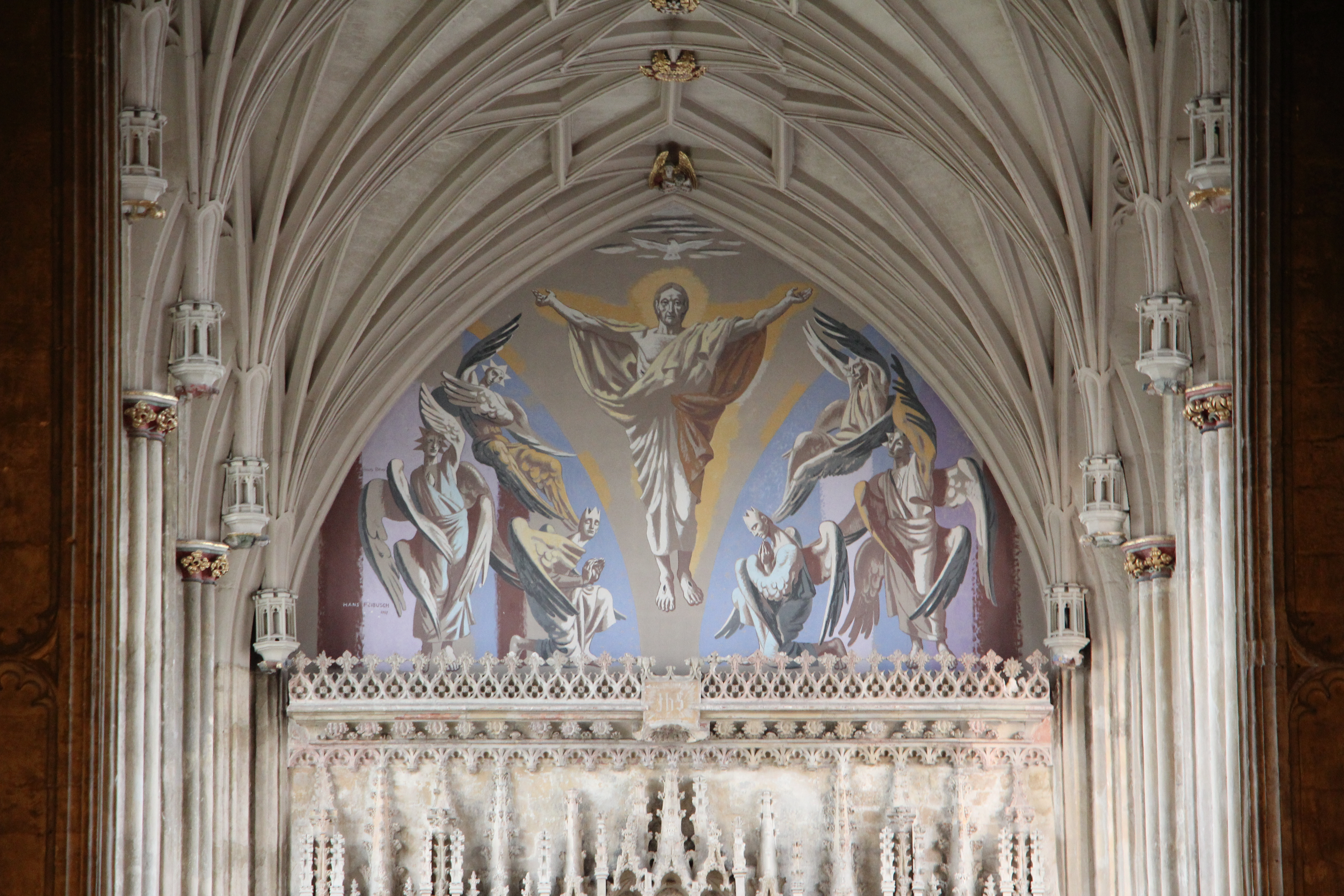
Christchurch Priory: the pendants hardly project from the vaults and are very close to the walls.

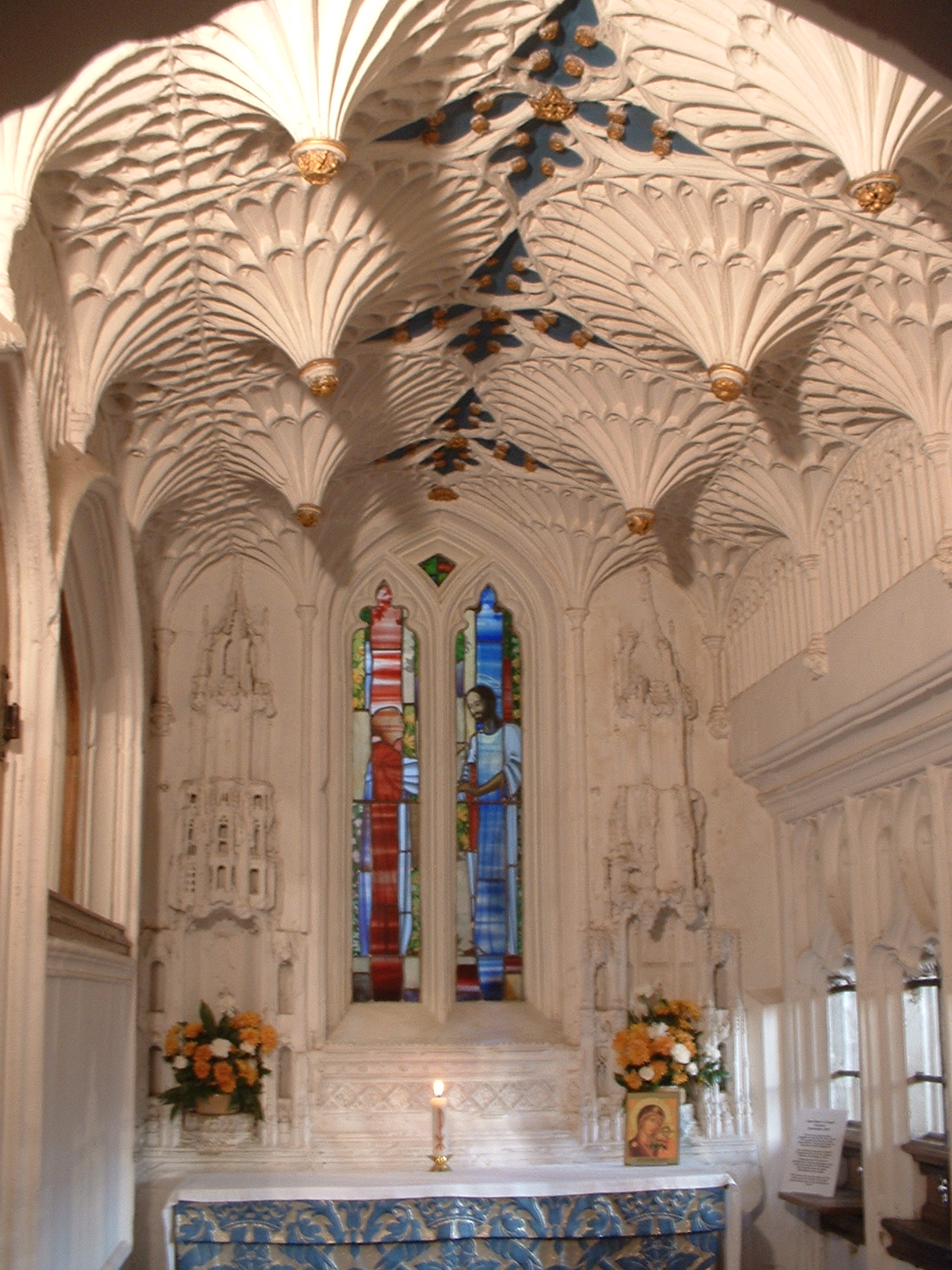
Pendant fan vault over the Dean's Chapel, Warwick

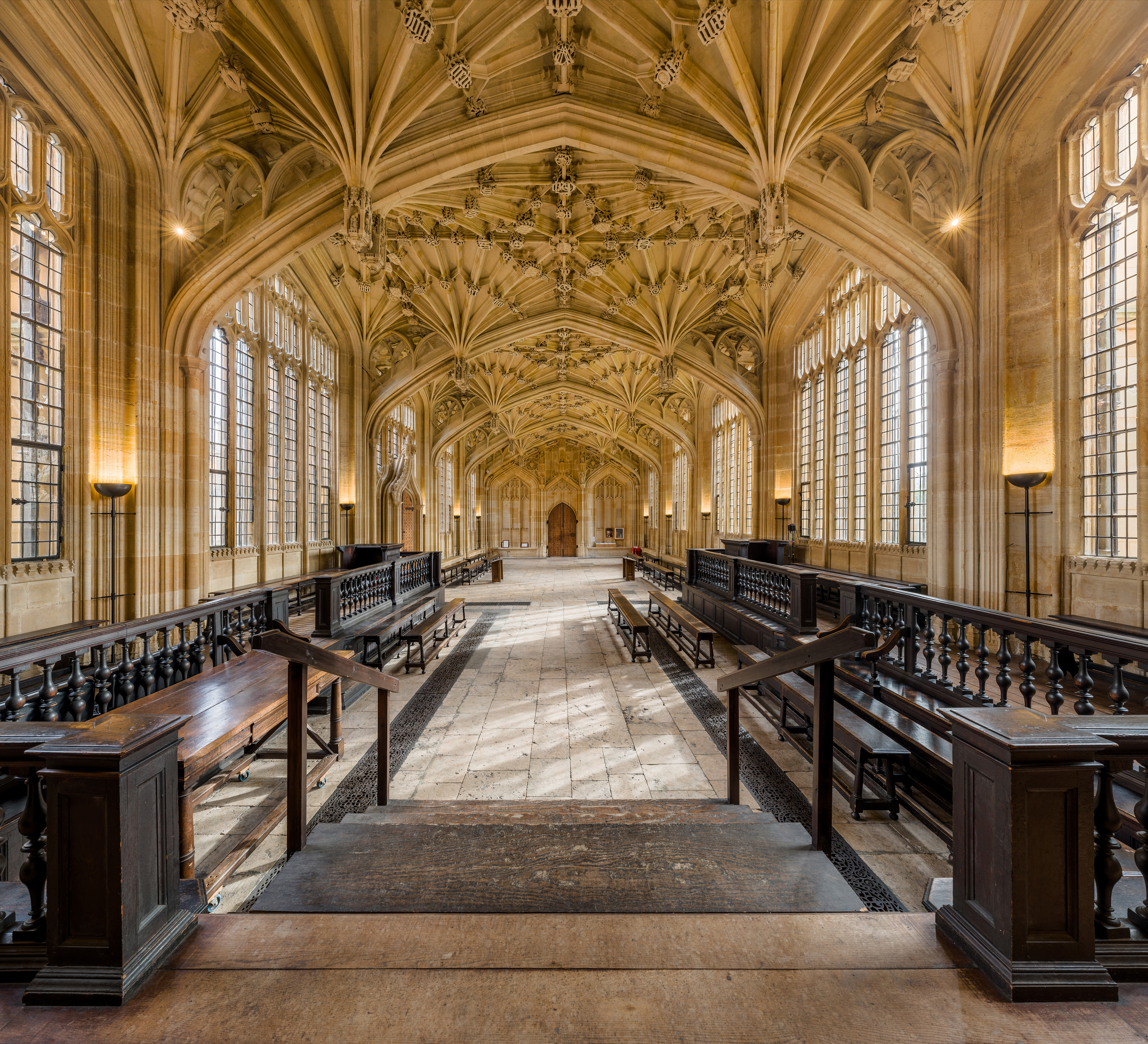
Pendant lierne vaulting at the Divinity School, Oxford

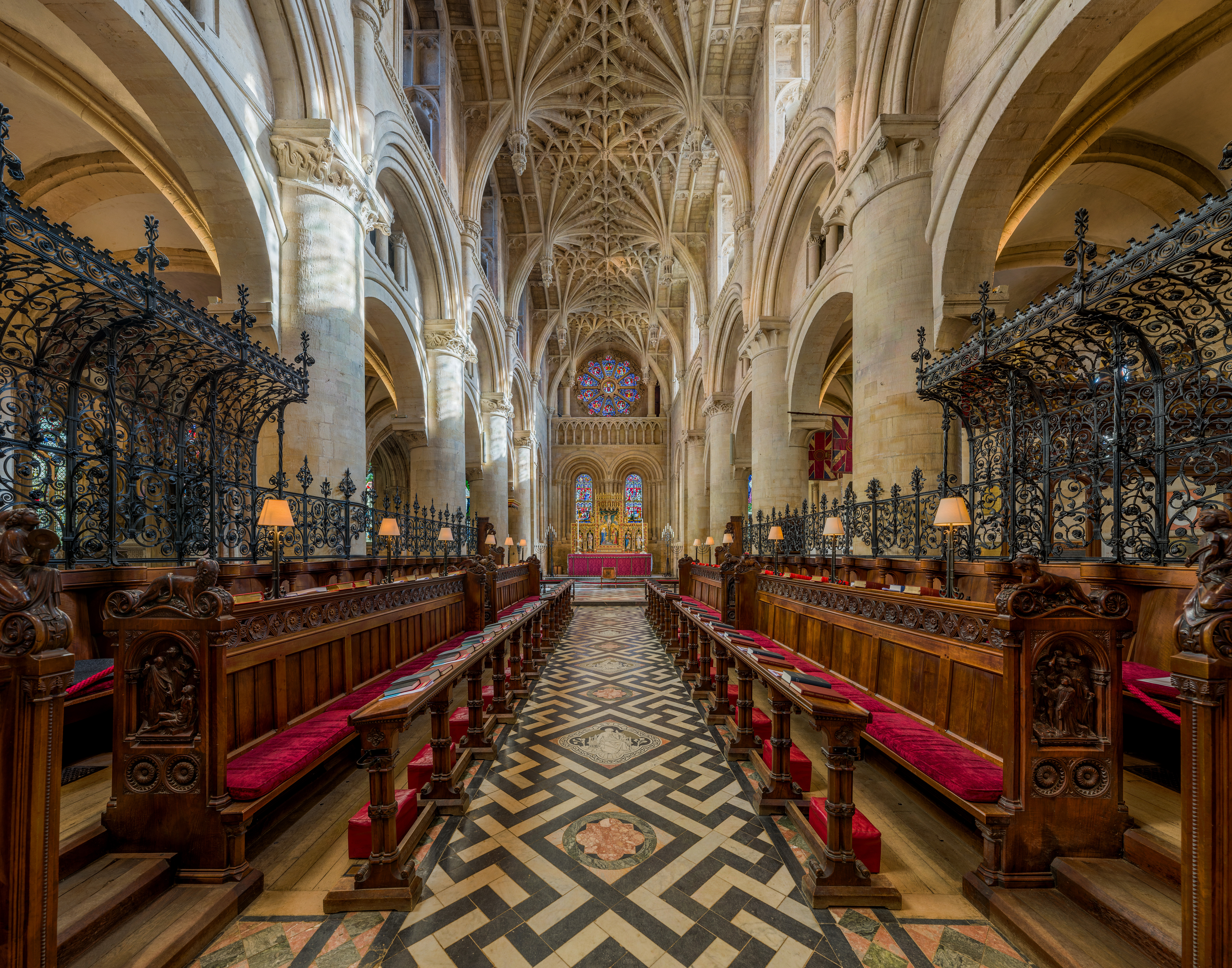
Pendant lierne vaulting in Christ Church Cathedral, Oxford

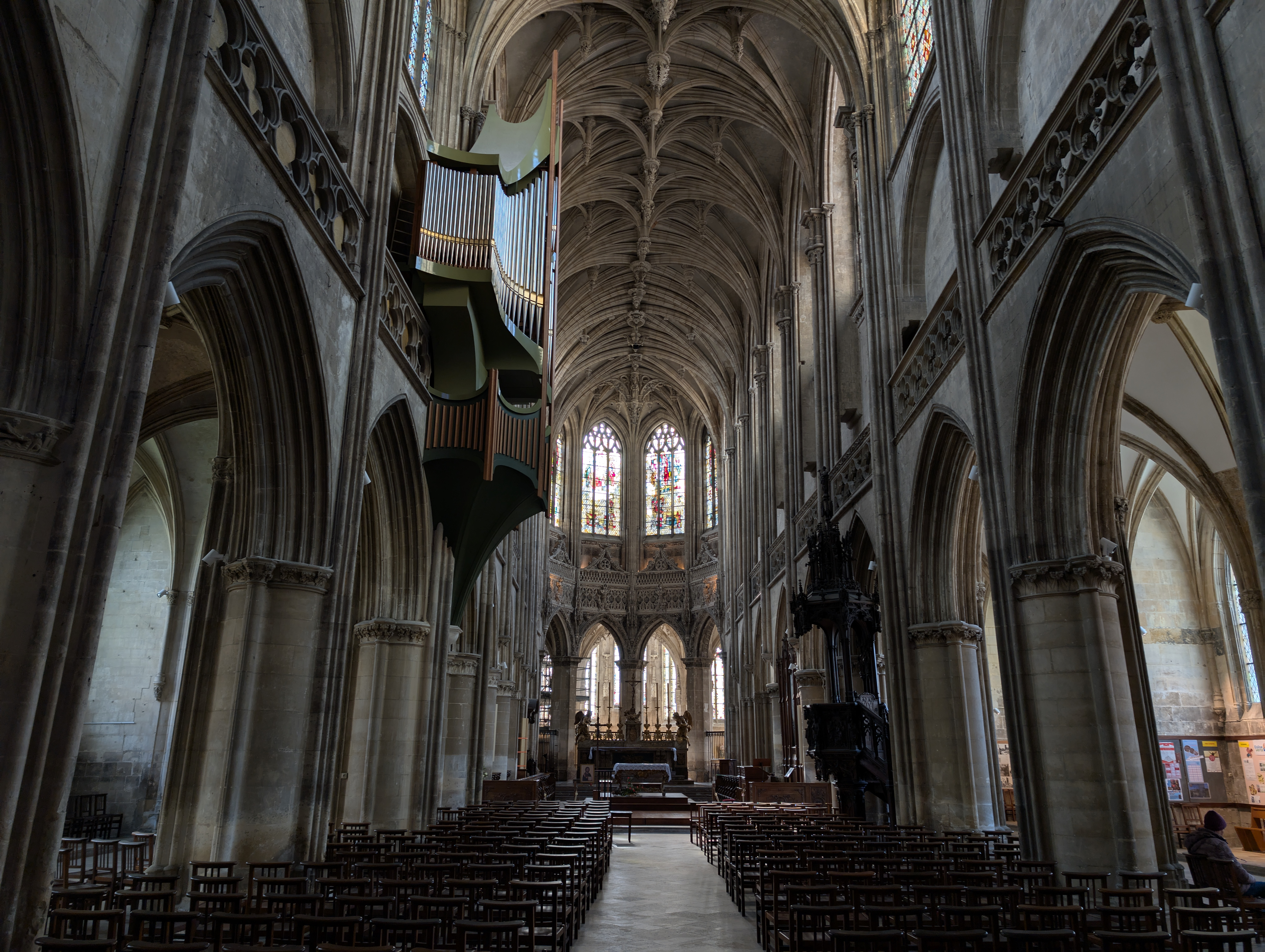
Pendant vaulting in Saint-Pierre, Caen

=== England ===
Small-scale pendant vaulting first appeared as part of the Decorated Style in England, for example in the north doorway of Prior Eastry's quire screens at Canterbury Cathedral (probably under construction in 1298). The elaboration of English vaulting, which started at Lincoln before 1200, made England the natural origin for Gothic pendant vaulting, as a pendant would blend in with rich lierne vaults in a way that it would not if applied to an austere French quadripartite vaulting. There were also experiments at the future Bristol Cathedral, with vaults carried on flying bridges, that explored the same themes as pendant vaults. It is possible that the origin of pendant vaults may be found in the small hanging portions seen in Islamic muqarnas vaulting, especially as England was at this time experimenting with other Islamic-derived features like the ogee arch. An alternative origin may be in timber ceilings and vaults, which were growing in elaboration at this time and were not constrained by the structural limitations of stone. A fine later example of such a ceiling may be seen at Crosby Hall in London.

Despite this auspicious context, the large-scale pendant vault was slow to develop; the first surviving example appears to be the lierne vault over the Lady Chapel at Christchurch Priory (c.1395), in which the immature pendants sit very close to the walls, suggesting that the form was still experimental. However, the destruction of major western abbey churches like Cirencester, Winchcombe and Evesham at the Dissolution means that the actual earliest example may now be lost. The next example is a small one over a chantry chapel at St Mary's, Warwick (1441-52), and this is the first to apply pendants to a fan vault This is also the first vault in which parts of the vault appear to spring from the pendants, rather than merely having extended voussoirs. In addition, it introduced the four-centred arch as the basis of the vault.

The Warwick vault appears to have inspired William Orchard's similarly low-pitched large vault over the Divinity School, Oxford (1479-83). This has the novel feature of separating the pendants, so they 'sandwich' the structural transverse arch, a conceit intended to "astonish and delight." From the Divinity School, the pendant vault became part of the repertoire of Court masons around London, Windsor and Oxford, like Robert and William Vertue. Orchard himself designed a similar vault over the choir of St Frideswide's Priory, now Oxford Cathedral (finished before 1503). The apogee of Court pendant vaulting is the Vertues' Henry VII's Chapel at Westminster (1503-09). There the fan conoids rise from the pendants, with more conoids descending as pendants from the ridge of the vault, while the positions of the concealed transverse arches are subtly indicated with a filigree of cusping.

=== France ===
While pendant fan vaulting is confined to England, versions of pendant vaulting came to be characteristic of the Flamboyant period in France. An example of this can be found at Caudebec.

== List of buildings with pendant vaults ==
=== England ===
With the exceptions of Christchurch (Dorset) and Warwick (Warwickshire), large pendant vaults are confined to London/Windsor and Oxford, where the Court school of masons was active.

- Canterbury Cathedral, north portal in quire screen (c.1298)
- Christchurch Priory, quire (1502-30) and lady chapel (c.1395) - Lierne vault
- Chapel Royal, Hampton Court Palace - Lierne vault
- Great Hall, oriel window, Hampton Court Palace - Fan vault
- Christ Church Cathedral, Oxford, chancel - Lierne vault by William Orchard (c.1500).
- Divinity School, Oxford - Lierne vault by William Orchard (1480s).
- Collegiate Church of St Mary, Warwick, Dean's chapel - Fan vault
- Henry VII Lady Chapel, Westminster Abbey - Fan vault by William Vertue (1503–1509).
- St George's Chapel, Windsor, quire - Lierne vault by Henry Janyns (1460s-90s)

=== France ===
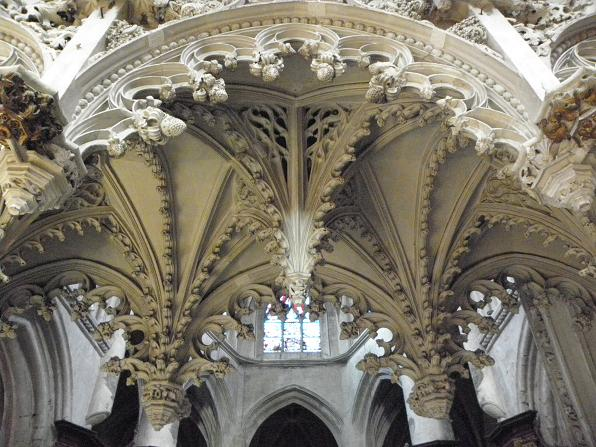
Pendant vault, St. Madeleine, Troyes.

- Albi Cathedral - Tierceron vault
- Église St. Étienne, Beauvais, side chapel - Lierne vault with flying ribs by Martin Chambiges
- Church of Saint-Pierre, Caen - Lierne vault
- Notre Dame, Caudebec-en-Caux - Tierceron vault (c1500).
- Église Notre-Dame-des-Marais, La Ferté-Bernard - Lierne vault
- Chapel Notre-Dame de Bon Secours, Noyon Cathedral - Lierne vault
- Église Saint-Eustache, Paris - Lierne vault
- Chapelle du Saint-Esprit, Rue, Somme - Tierceron vault
- Senlis Cathedral, side chapels - Lierne vault with flying ribs by Martin Chambiges
- St. Madeleine, Troyes, rood screen - Lierne vault

=== Central Europe ===
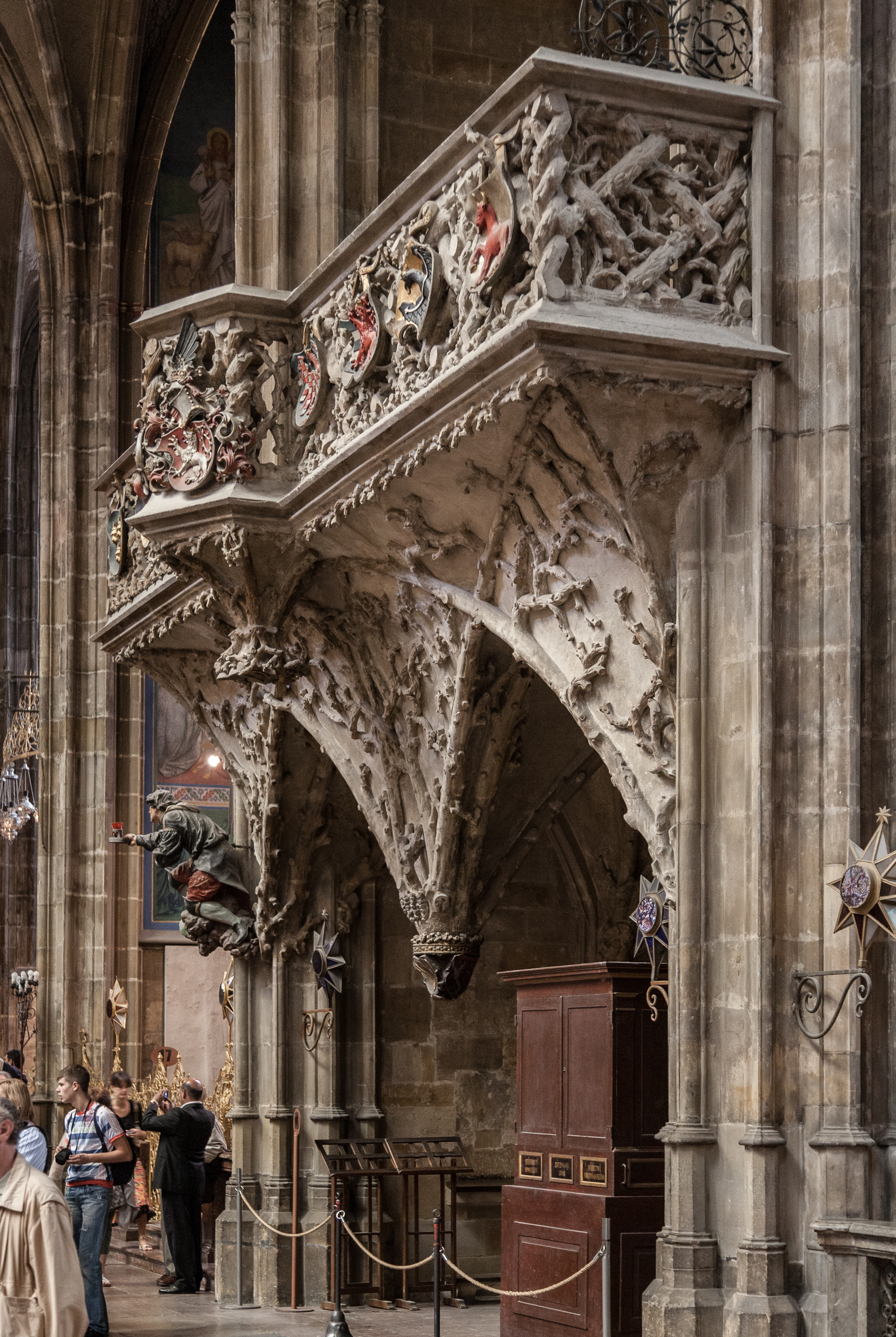
Vaulting in the royal oratory, St Vitus Cathedral, with ribs carved to look like branches

- Křivoklát Castle, Czech Republic, chapel - Lierne vault with flying ribs
- Church of the Assumption of the Virgin Mary (Most), Czech Republic - Lierne vault with flying ribs
- St Vitus Cathedral, Prague - royal oratory gallery
- St Catherine's Chapel, St Stephen's Cathedral, Vienna - small Lierne vault with flying ribs

== Gothic Revival ==
In the Gothic revival period, pendant vaults were among the many Gothic features used on buildings, especially earlier in the 19th century. Unlike in medieval buildings, pendant vaults were often of plaster, avoiding the structural difficulties associated with masonry pendant vaults. Examples include:

- St John's Church, Edinburgh - Fan vault
- Unitarian Church in Charleston, Charleston, South Carolina, United States - Fan vault
- St Mary's Church, Wellingborough, Wellingborough - Fan vault
- St. Peter's Roman Catholic Church (Harpers Ferry, West Virginia) -Rib vault
