= Duke Humfrey's Library =

Reading room in the Bodleian Library

Coordinates: 51.7540°N 1.2549°W

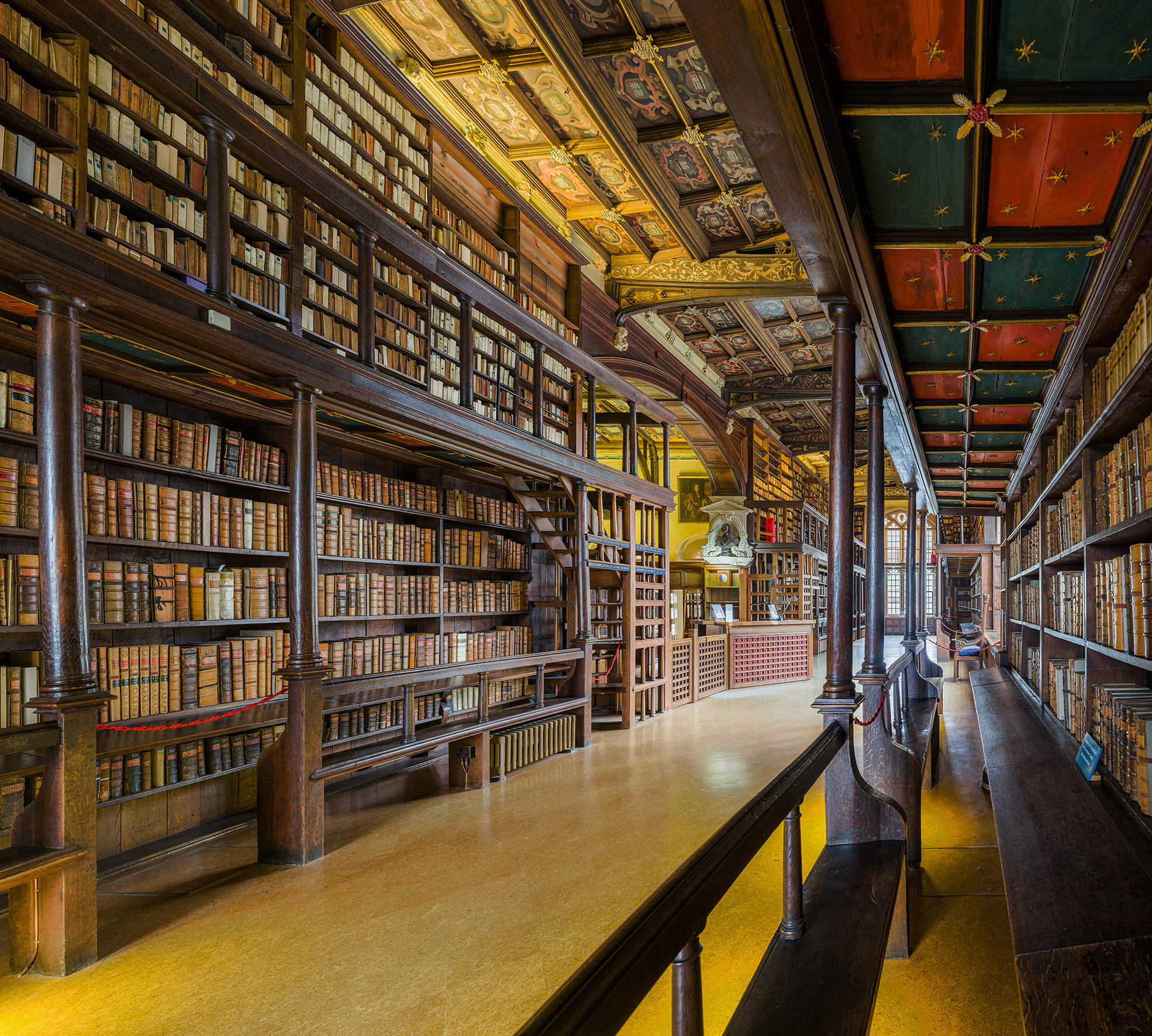
Library interior

Duke Humfrey's Library is the oldest reading room in the Bodleian Library at the University of Oxford. It is named after Humphrey of Lancaster, 1st Duke of Gloucester, who donated 281 books after his death in 1447. Sections of the libraries were restored and expanded in the 16th and 17th centuries, including the addition of a second storey, an east wing and a west wing. The library currently functions as a reading room.

== History ==
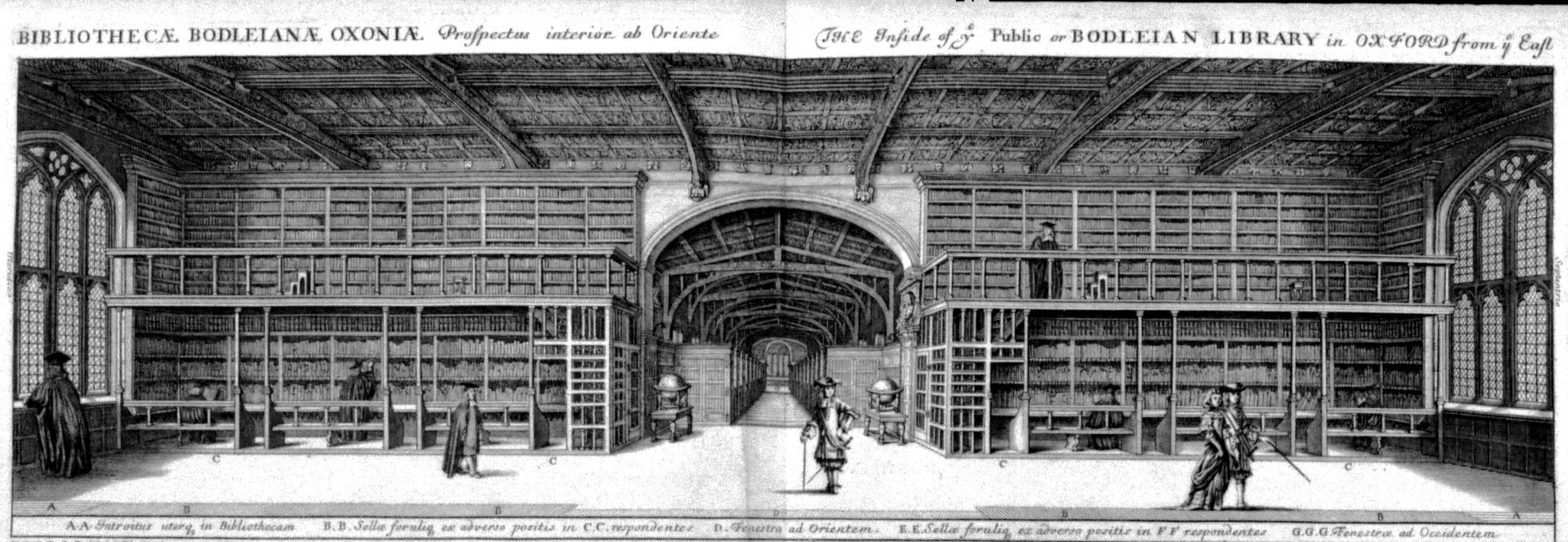
Engraving of Arts End, Duke Humfrey's Library

Duke Humfrey's Library is named after Humphrey of Lancaster, 1st Duke of Gloucester, a younger son of Henry IV of England. He was a connoisseur of literature and commissioned translations of classical works from Greek into Latin. When he died in 1447, he donated his collection of 281 books to the University. This was considered a very generous donation, as the university at the time only had 20 books and all classes were taught via oral lectures; prior to Gutenberg's circa 1450 invention of the movable type press, books were hand-copied and were only for the very wealthy.

The library was constructed as a second storey to the Divinity School between 1450 and 1480 in order to house the collection. In 1550, during the Reformation, the King's Commissioners despoiled the library in order to destroy the vestiges of Roman Catholicism in the country. Some of the books were taken and hidden by people in their homes to protect them- they are slowly returning to circulation, and in 1556 the furniture was removed by the university. Today, only three of Humfrey's original books remain in the library. The MS. Duke Humfrey c. 1 was reacquired in the 2020s, with a history of ownership from Jean le Bon, King of France in the mid C14th to Lancastrian royalty in England by early C15th.

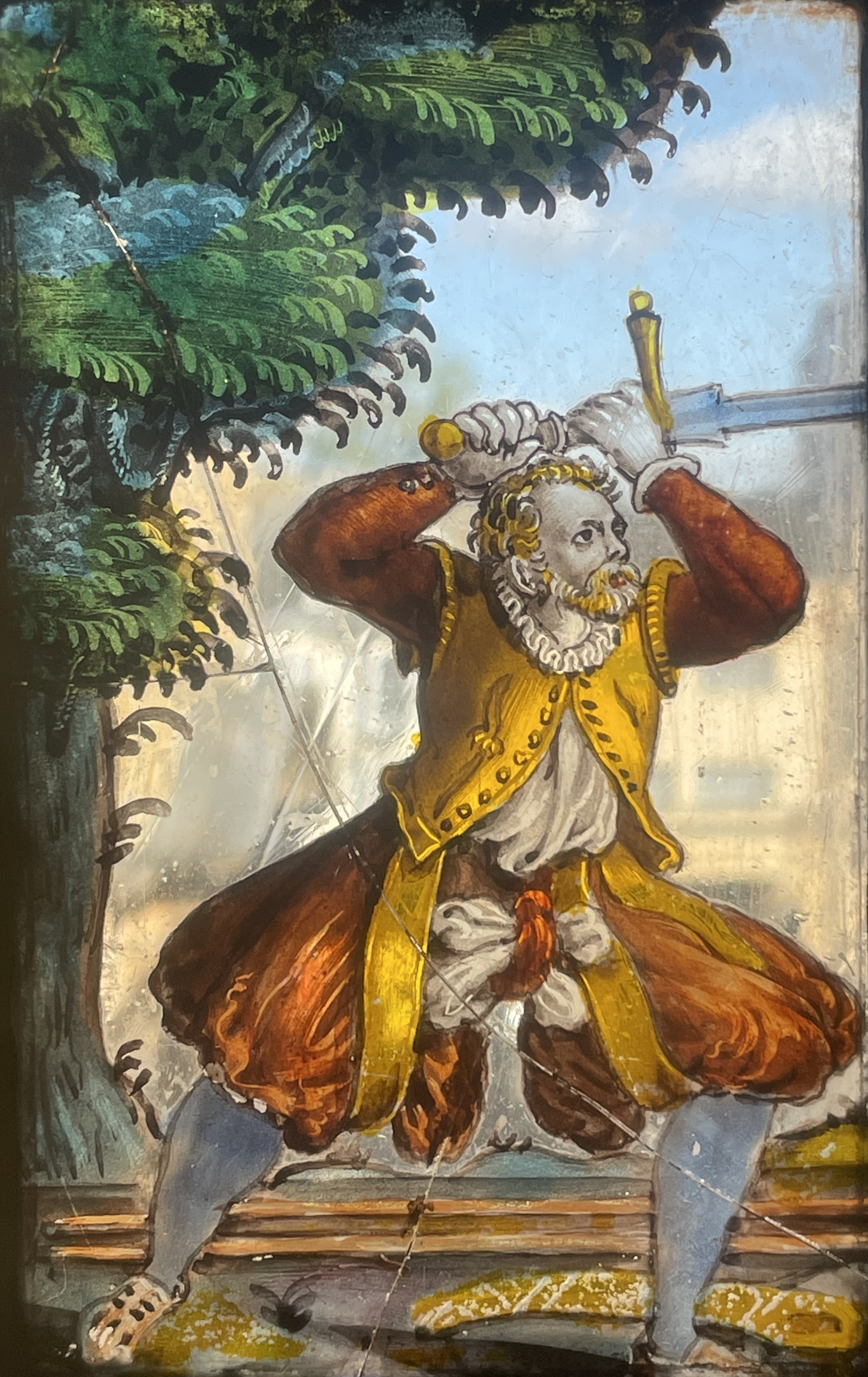
A stained glass depiction of a swordsman in the Bodleian Library's Duke Humphrey library

The Library was refitted and restored from 1598 by Sir Thomas Bodley and between 1610 and 1612, the east wing (now the Arts End) was added. The west wing (now the Selden End) was built 20 years later. The books in the oldest part are in housed in oak bookcases at right angles to the walls, with integral desks. The ceiling consists of panels painted with the arms of the university. Up until the opening of the new Weston Library in 2015, Duke Humfrey's Library functioned as a reading room for maps, music and pre-1641 rare books; it now serves as an additional reading room for users of the library.

== Collections ==
The Library consists of the original medieval section (1487), the Arts End (1612), and the Selden End (1637). It houses collections of maps, music, Western manuscripts, and theology and art materials. It is the main reading room for researchers of codicology, bibliography and local history, as well as it containing the University Archives and the Conservative Party Archive.

== Layout ==
The Library is on the first floor and forms an H-shape with the later parts as the uprights. The Arts End is above the Proscholium and is attached at two corners to the Old Schools Quadrangle. The medieval section is above the Divinity School and Selden End (named after John Selden a benefactor of the library) is above the Convocation House.

A drawing of the medieval section with the Divinity School below in isolation is used as the emblem of the Bodleian Library.

== Culture ==
Duke Humfrey's Library was used as the Hogwarts Library in the Harry Potter films.

The interior of Duke Humfrey's Library

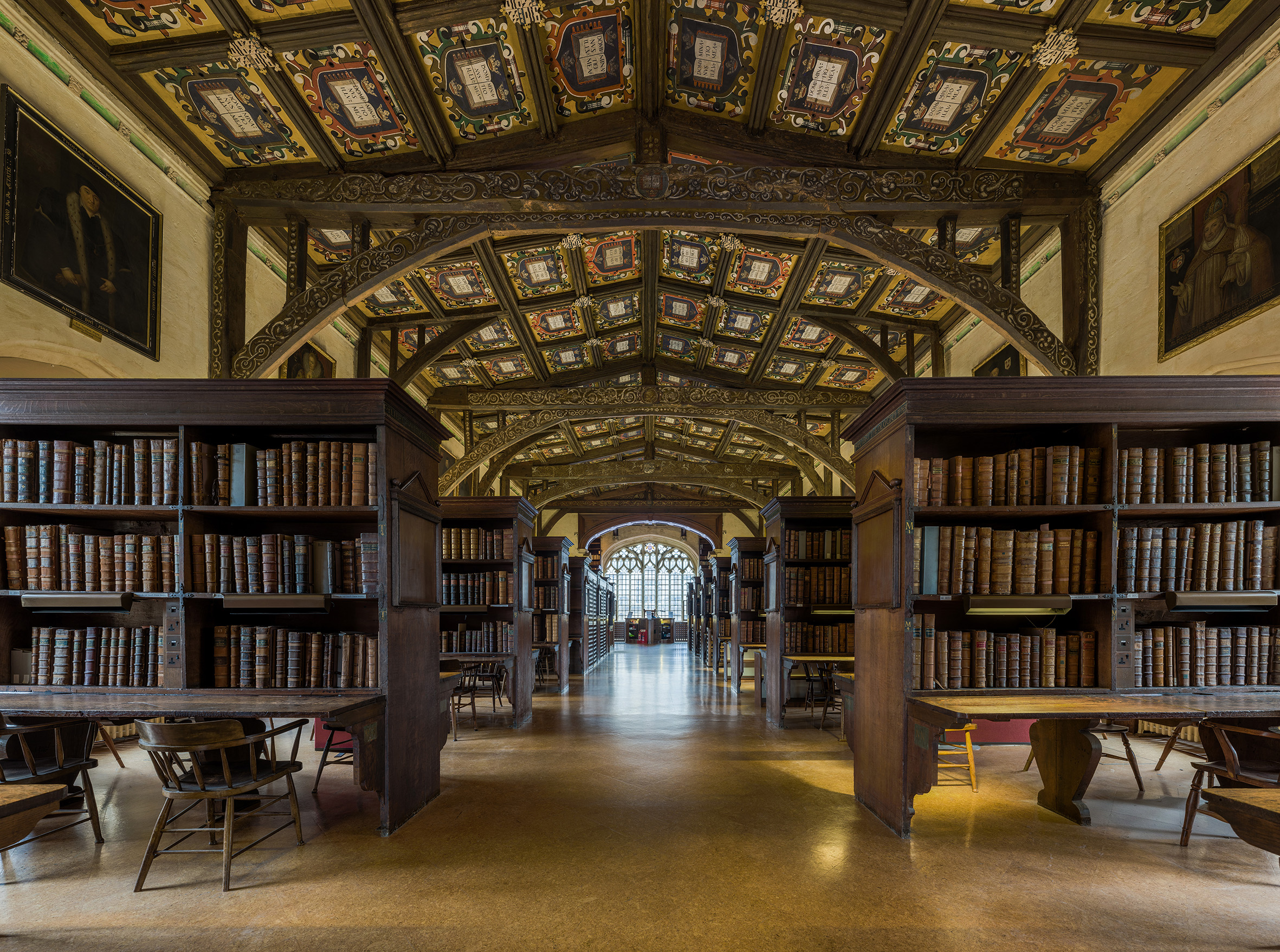

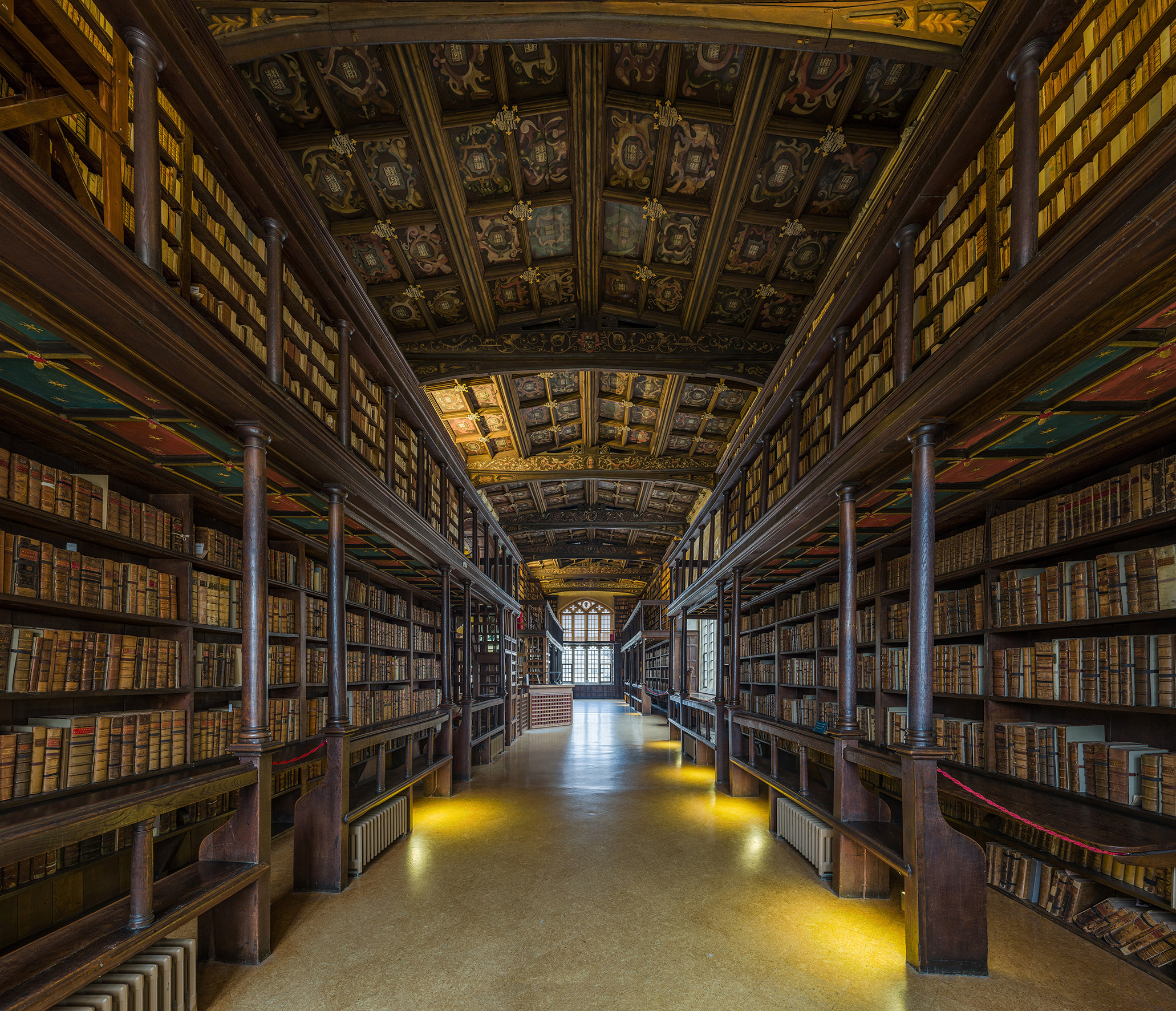

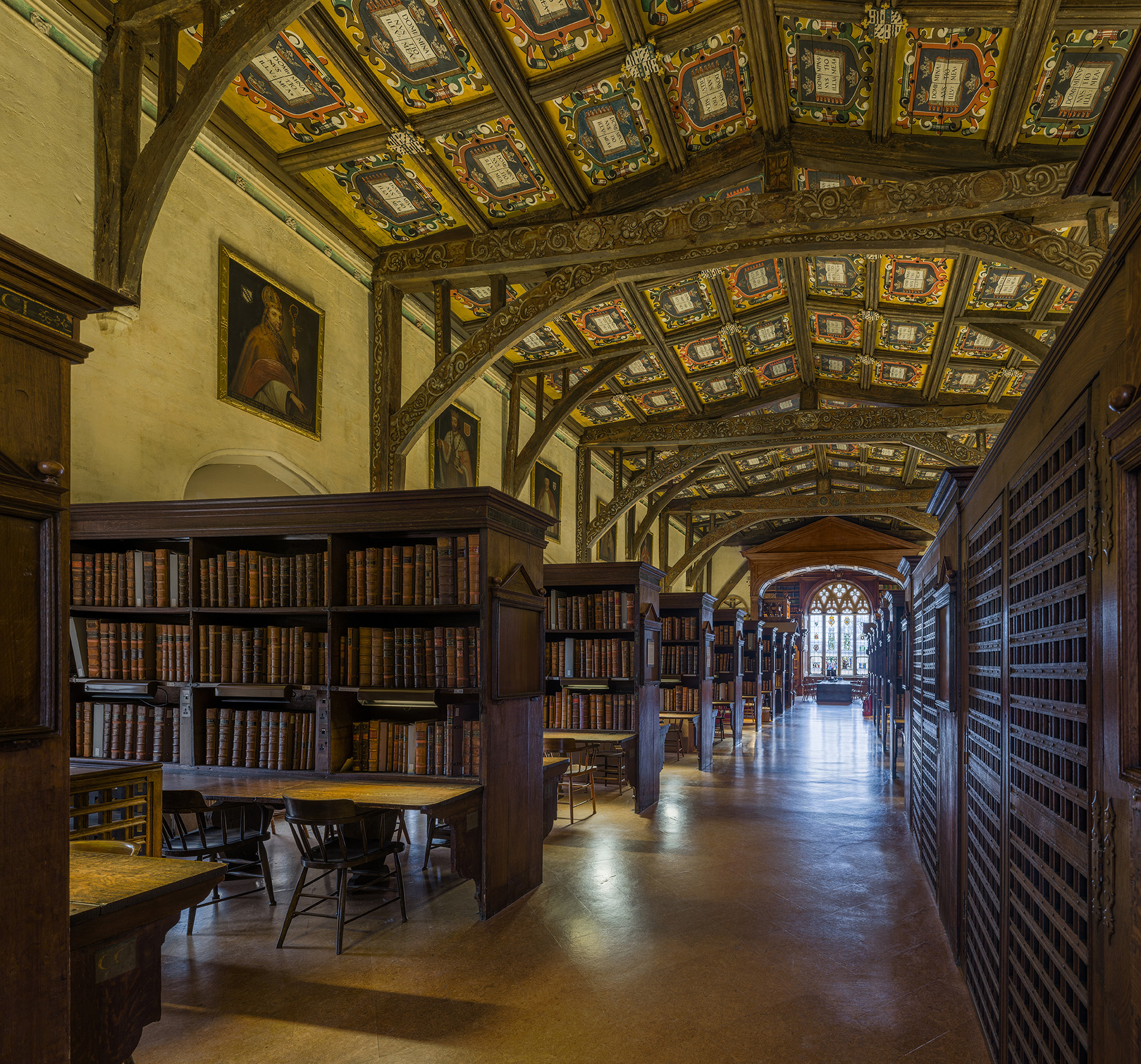

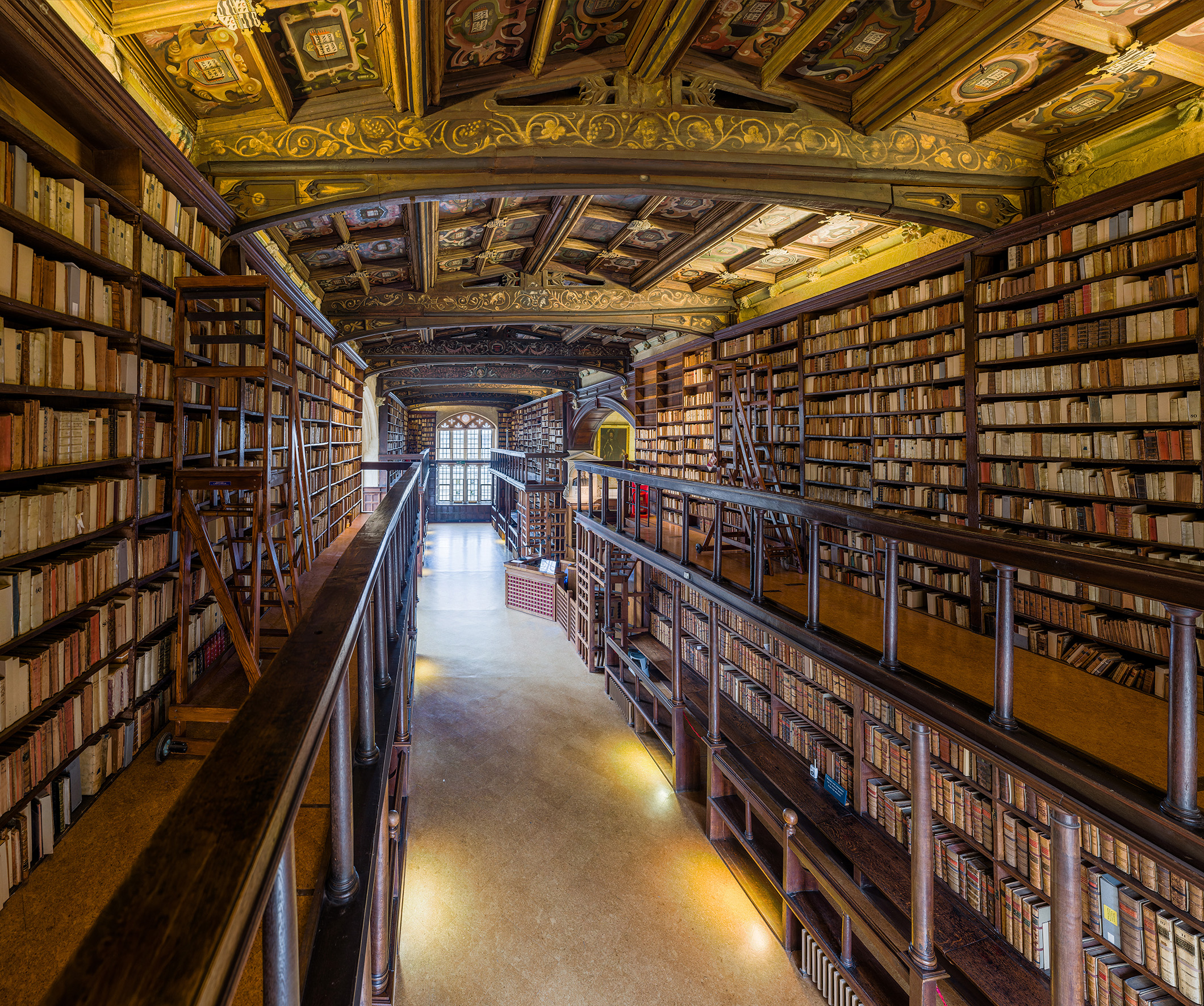
