= William Orchard (architect) =

English architect

William Orchard (fl. 1468 – died 1504) was an English gothic architect, responsible for the elaborate pendant vaults of the Divinity School, Oxford and the chancel of Christ Church Cathedral, Oxford. He worked on the cloister and designed the Great Tower of Magdalen College, Oxford also known as Magdalen Tower. He also designed the parish church of Waterstock. He lived at Barton, a hamlet of Headington, where he owned a Quarry.

== Gallery of architectural work ==
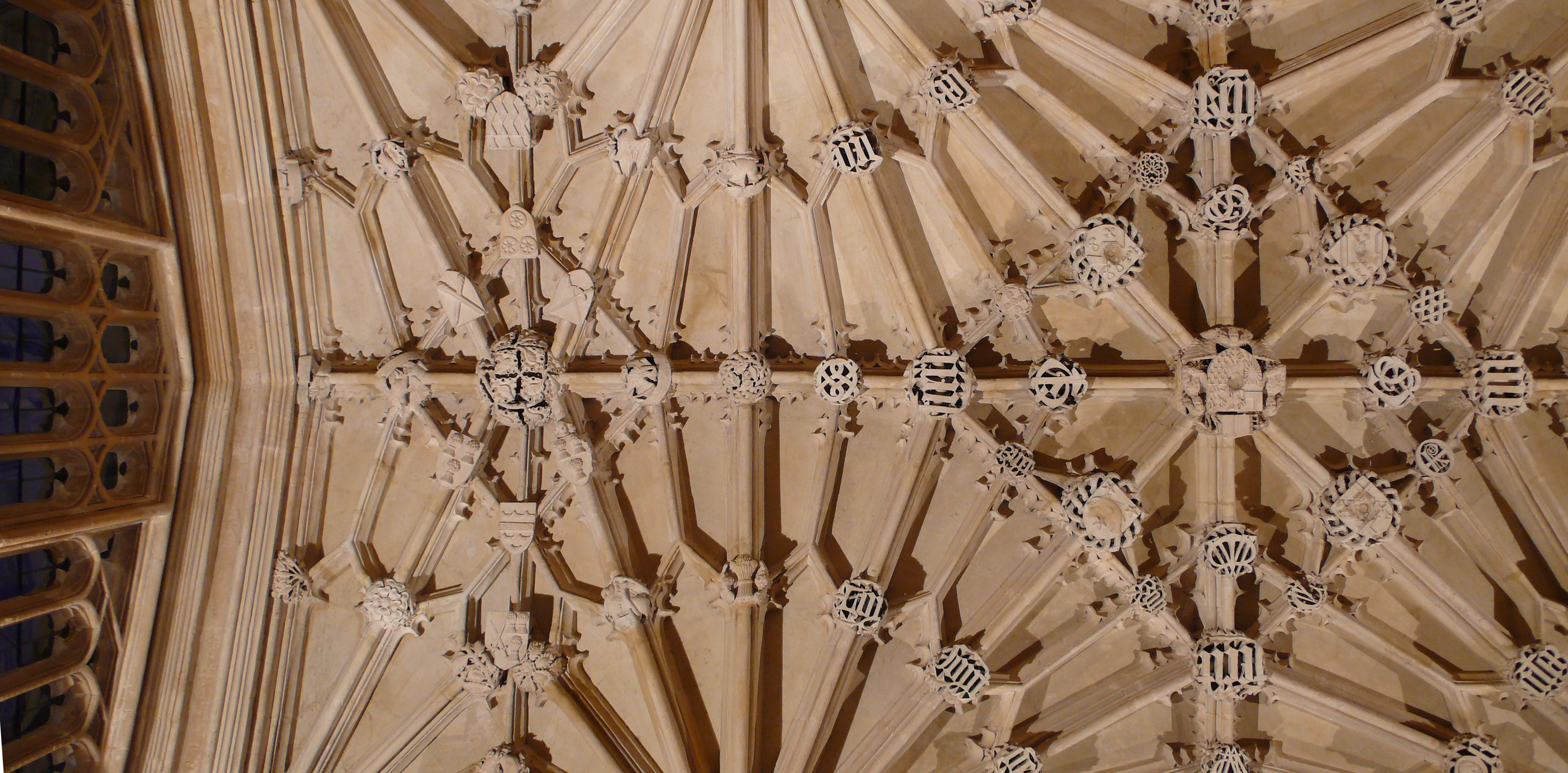
Detail of vault, Oxford Divinity School

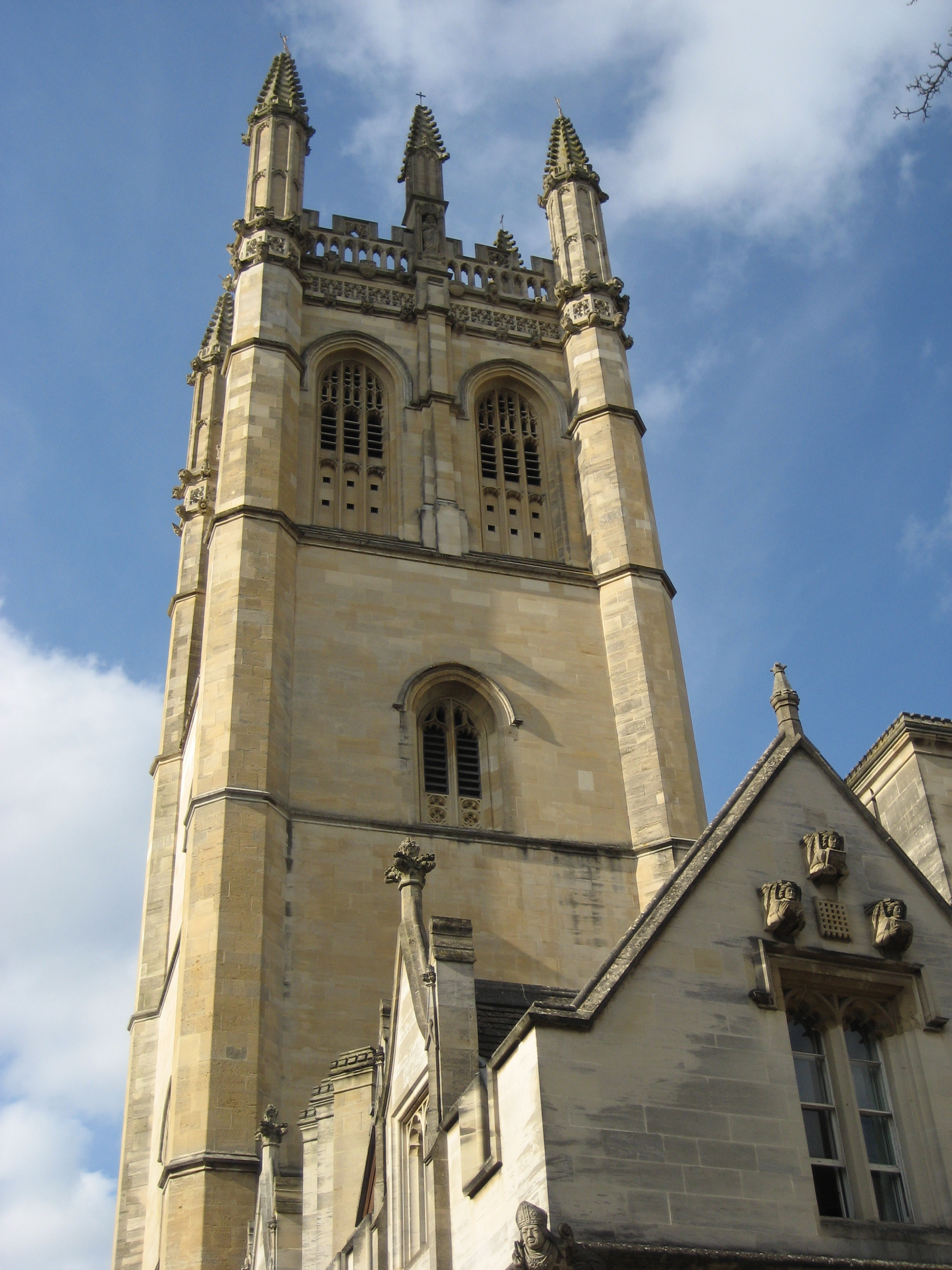
Tower, Magdalen College, Oxford

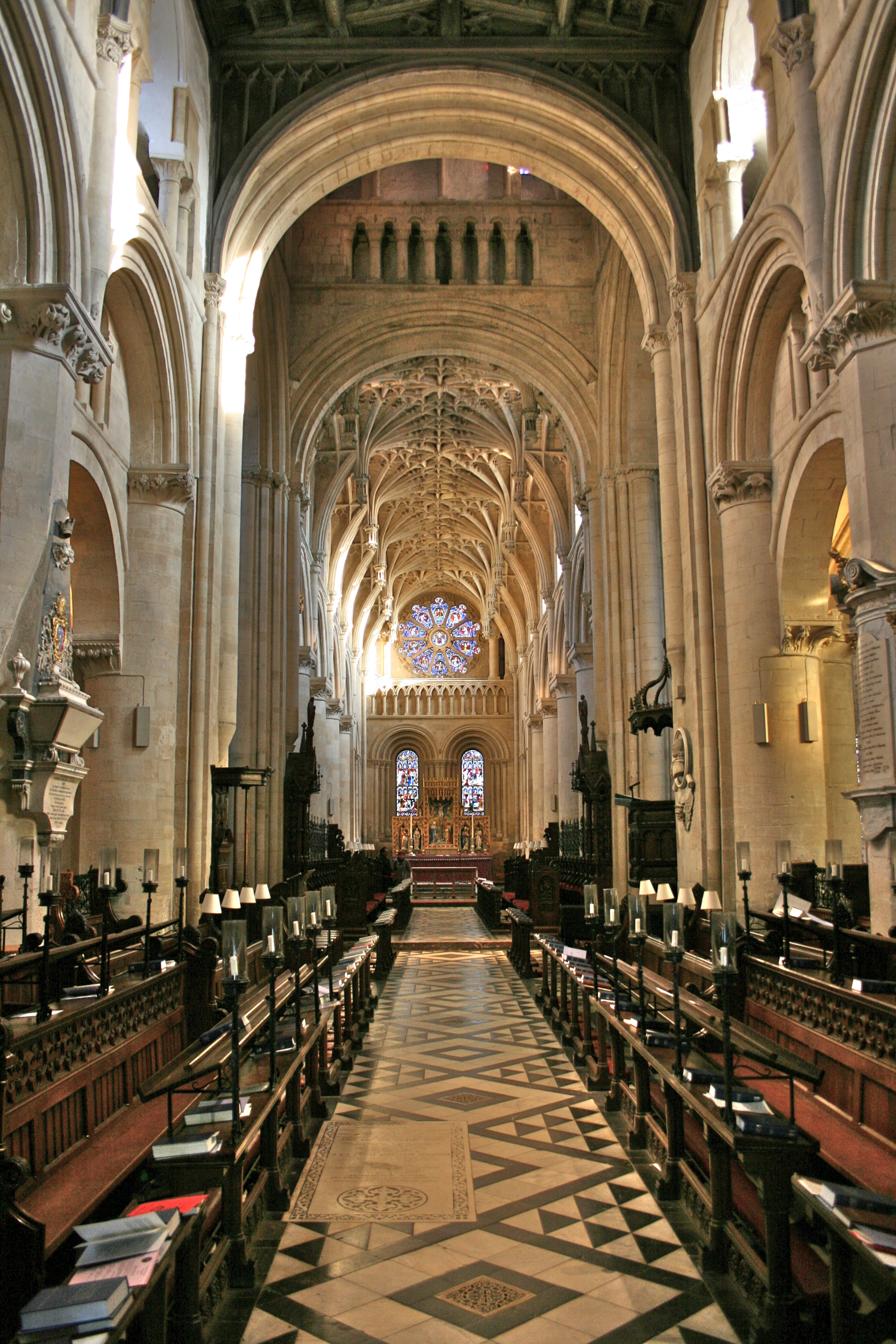
Oxford Cathedral, Orchard's vault is visible at the far end

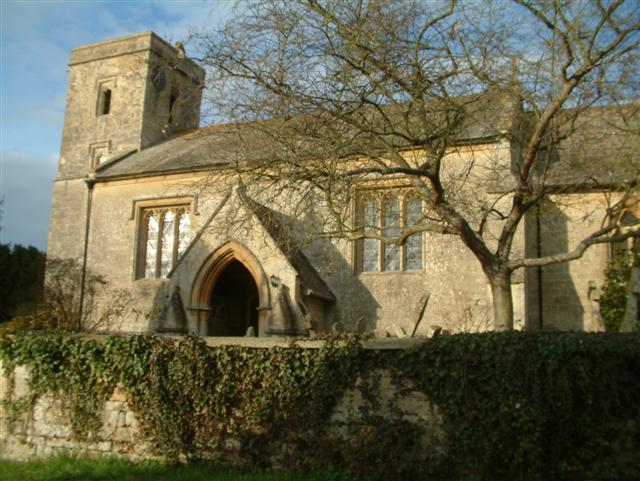
St. Leonards Church, Waterstock
