= Convocation =

Formal assembly (typically ecclesiastical or academic)

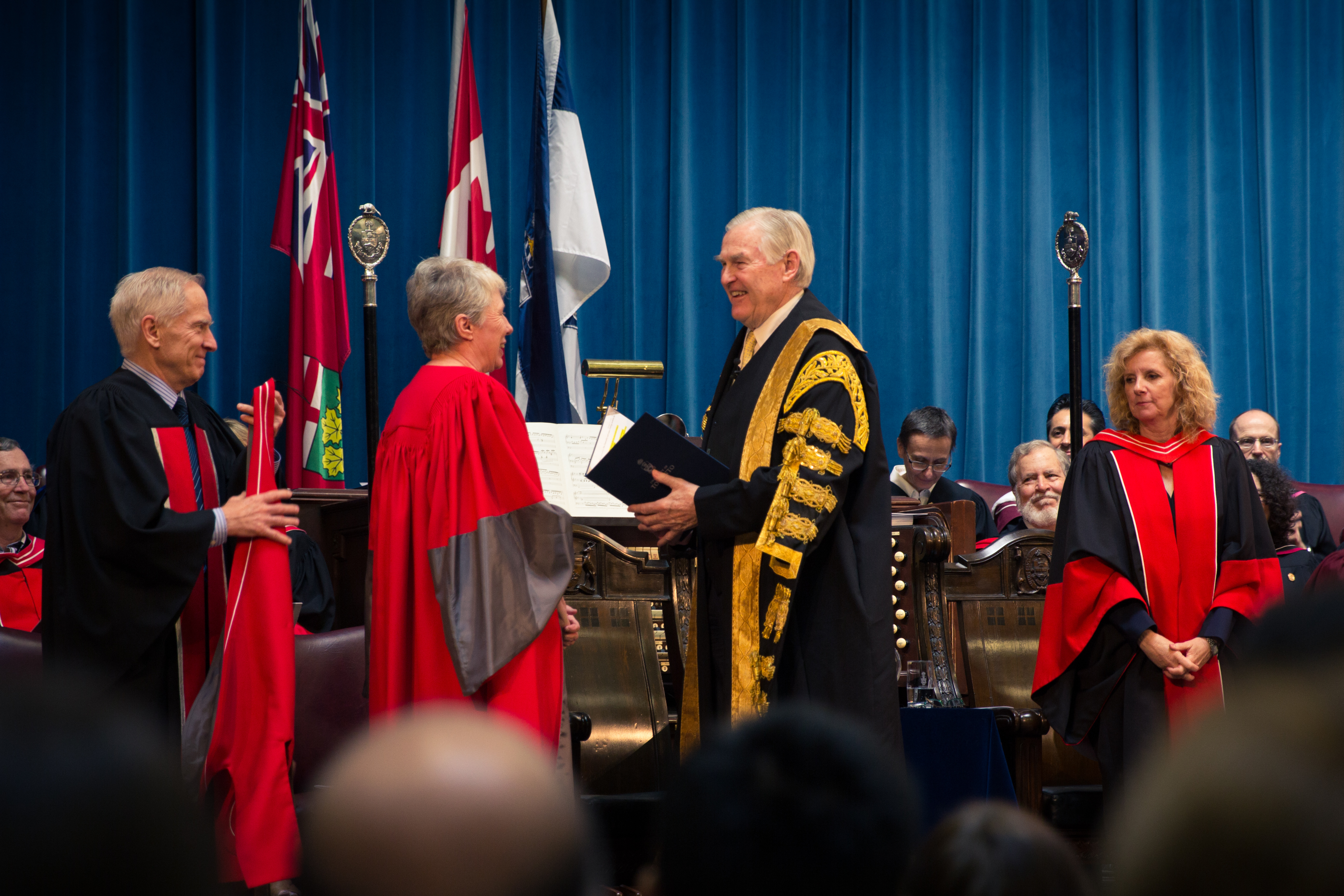
Degree being awarded at a University of Toronto convocation

A convocation (from Latin convocare 'to call/come together', a rough calque of Greek ἐκκλησία ekklēsia) is a group of people formally assembled for a specific purpose, typically an ecclesiastical or academic one.

In academic use, it can be a ceremonial assembly of the university for graduation or commencement, or of the institution's alumni. Some institutions hold a convocation at the start of the academic year to welcome incoming students.

== Ecclesiastical convocations ==
A synodical assembly of a church is at times called "Convocation".

=== Convocations of Canterbury and York ===
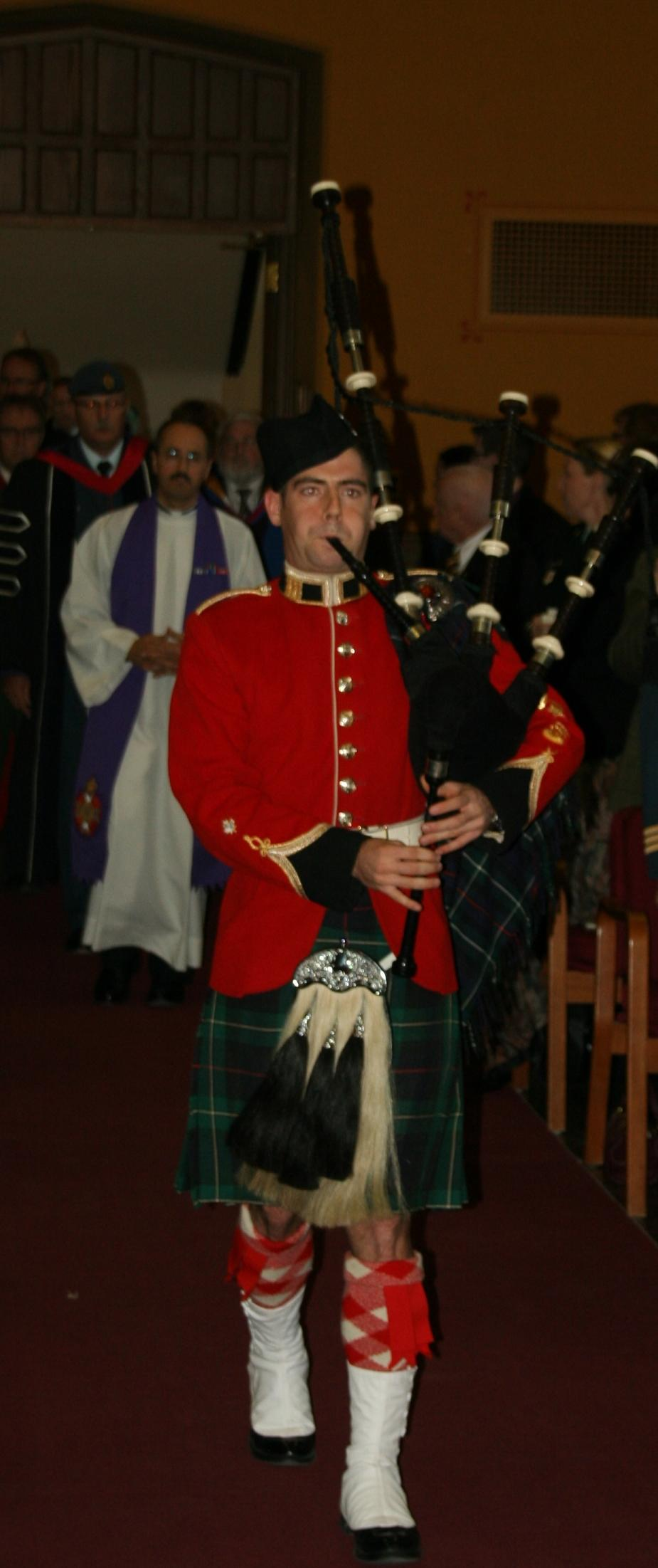
A cadet of the Royal Military College of Canada plays bagpipes in Currie Hall during the college's fall Convocation.

The Convocations of Canterbury and York were the synodical assemblies of the two provinces of the Church of England until the Church Assembly was established in 1920. Their origins date back to the end of the seventh century when Theodore of Tarsus (Archbishop of Canterbury, 668–690) reorganized the structures of the English Church and established a national synod of bishops. With the recognition of York as a separate province in 733, this synod was divided into two. In 1225, representatives of the cathedral and monastic chapters were included for the first time and in 1285 the membership of the Convocation of Canterbury assumed the basic form which it retained till 1921: Bishops, Abbots (till the 1530s and the Dissolution of the Monasteries), Deans, and Archdeacons, plus one representative of each cathedral chapter and two for the clergy from each diocese. By the fifteenth century, each convocation was divided into an upper house (the Bishops) and a lower house (the remaining members). In 1921, the number of proctors (elected representatives) of the diocesan clergy was increased to make them a majority in the lower houses.

The Convocation of York was a relatively small part of the Church in England and Wales with only five member dioceses in Henry VIII's reign. (Note: York, Durham, Carlisle, Chester, and Man. In medieval times there were only four: Galloway, York, Durham and Carlisle. (Kemp Counsel and Consent pp.247,248) Only with the establishment of the Diocese of Ripon in 1836 did the number increase.) In 1462 it decided that all the provincial constitutions (Note: Ad hoc decisions which amplified the canon law of the Western Church to meet local conditions) of Canterbury which were not repugnant or prejudicial to its own should be allowed in the Northern Province and by 1530 the Archbishop of York rarely attended sessions and the custom that York waited to see what Canterbury had decided and either accepted or rejected it was well established. The Convocation of York was, in practice, taking second place to that of Canterbury so much so that in 1852 the Archbishop of York Thomas Musgrave stated that since the time of Henry VIII the archbishop had only attended personally two sessions (in 1689 and 1708).

The legislative powers of the convocations varied considerably over the centuries. Until 1664, they (not Parliament) determined the taxes to be paid by the clergy, but their powers in general were severely curtailed by Henry VIII in 1532/4; (Note: They could only meet at the royal pleasure; they needed royal permission to discuss and make canons; no action of theirs could go against the sovereign's prerogative, or the customs, laws and statutes of the realm.) and from the time of the Reformation till 1965 they were summoned and dissolved at the same time as Parliament. Under Henry VIII and his successor Edward VI between 1534 and 1553 the Convocations were used as a source of clerical opinion but ecclesiastical legislation was secured by statute from Parliament. Later, between 1559 and 1641, Elizabeth I, James I and Charles I gave the force of law to decisions of Convocation without recourse to Parliament by letters patent under the great seal, notably the Thirty-Nine Articles (1571) and the 141 Canons of 1603.

The Convocations were abolished during the Commonwealth but restored on the accession of Charles II in 1660 and they synodically approved the Book of Common Prayer, which was imposed by the Act of Uniformity in 1662. Formal sessions at the start of each parliament continued but no real business was discussed until after the Revolution of 1688 which brought William III and Mary II to the throne, when attempts to include some of the Protestant dissenters met such resistance in the lower house that the government abandoned them and the Convocations resumed their purely formal meetings.

In 1697 Francis Atterbury published his Letter to a Convocation Man concerning the Rights, Powers and Privileges of that Body which, in essence, claimed that the Convocation was an estate of the realm like Parliament and that the lower clergy were being illegally disfranchised and denied its proper voice in government. Business was resumed in 1701 and by the time Queen Anne died in 1714 draft canons and forms of service had been drawn up for royal assent. However, there was an inherent tension between the two houses: the lower house was mainly Tory in its politics and high church in its doctrine, while the upper house was mainly Whig and latitudinarian and therefore in favour of toleration for Protestant dissenters and their possible reincorporation into the Church of England; feelings ran high until in 1717 the session was prorogued by Royal Writ to avoid the censuring of Bishop Benjamin Hoadly by the lower house (see the Bangorian controversy) and, with the exception of an abortive session in 1741, the Convocations met only for formal business at the beginning of each parliament until the middle of the nineteenth century, when Canterbury (in 1852) and York (in 1861) began to discuss issues of the day.

The resumption of proper business was brought about by the political changes which had taken place some twenty years earlier. Until the Great Reform Bill of 1832, Parliament had been theoretically an Anglican body, and many churchmen began to argue that neither Parliament nor the bishops in the House of Lords expressed the mind of the Church as a whole In 1847 the routine session at the beginning of a new Parliament coincided with the polemical nomination of Dr Hampden to the see of Hereford. The formal address to the Queen was debated for six hours and an amendment carried praying the Crown to revive the active powers of convocation. The driving force behind the campaign to achieve this was the London banker, Henry Hoare, who dedicated himself to the task. The opposition was formidable: half the clergy and most of the laity rejected the idea, many politicians were against it and the two archbishops—John Bird Sumner and Thomas Musgrave—had no desire to revive Convocation. The legal basis of the resistance was the claim that convocation could only discuss such business as was expressly specified by the Crown. Over the next eight years it was established that it could debate and act provided it did not try to discuss or frame canons and that the archbishop could only prorogue (adjourn) a session with the consent of his fellow diocesans. In 1851, Canterbury received a petition; in 1853, it appointed committees; and by 1855, Archbishop Sumner was convinced of the value of convocation, while those bishops who had opposed the revival were taking part positively in its debates. Archbishop Musgrave maintained his opposition until his death in 1860—he even locked the room where it was due to meet—and the Northern Convocation remained inactive until his successor took office.

The convocations have always been exclusively clerical assemblies. However, in 1885, the convocations agreed to the establishment of parallel Houses of Laity, elected by the lay members of the diocesan conferences. These were not part of the Convocation; they had no constitutional status and were merely advisory. At the beginning of the twentieth century, both convocations together with their respective houses of laity began to meet as a Representative Council which however had no legal authority or position. This was superseded in 1920 by the Church Assembly which was given the right to propose measures to Parliament by the Church of England Assembly (Powers) Act 1919. The convocations still exist and their members constitute the two clerical houses of the General Synod but, apart from some residual and formal responsibilities, all legal authority is now vested in the synod which was established in 1970.

== University use ==
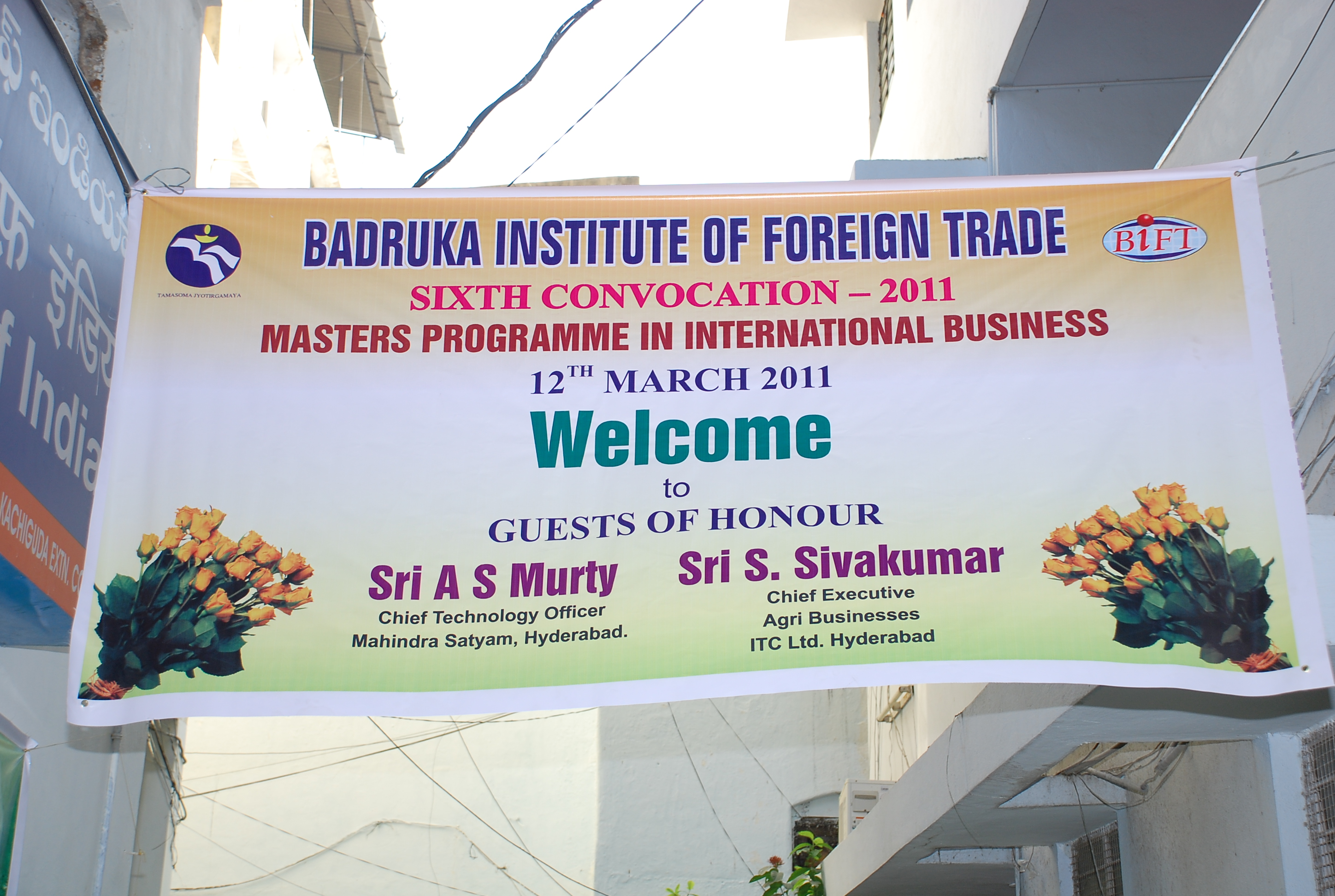
A college convocation banner in India

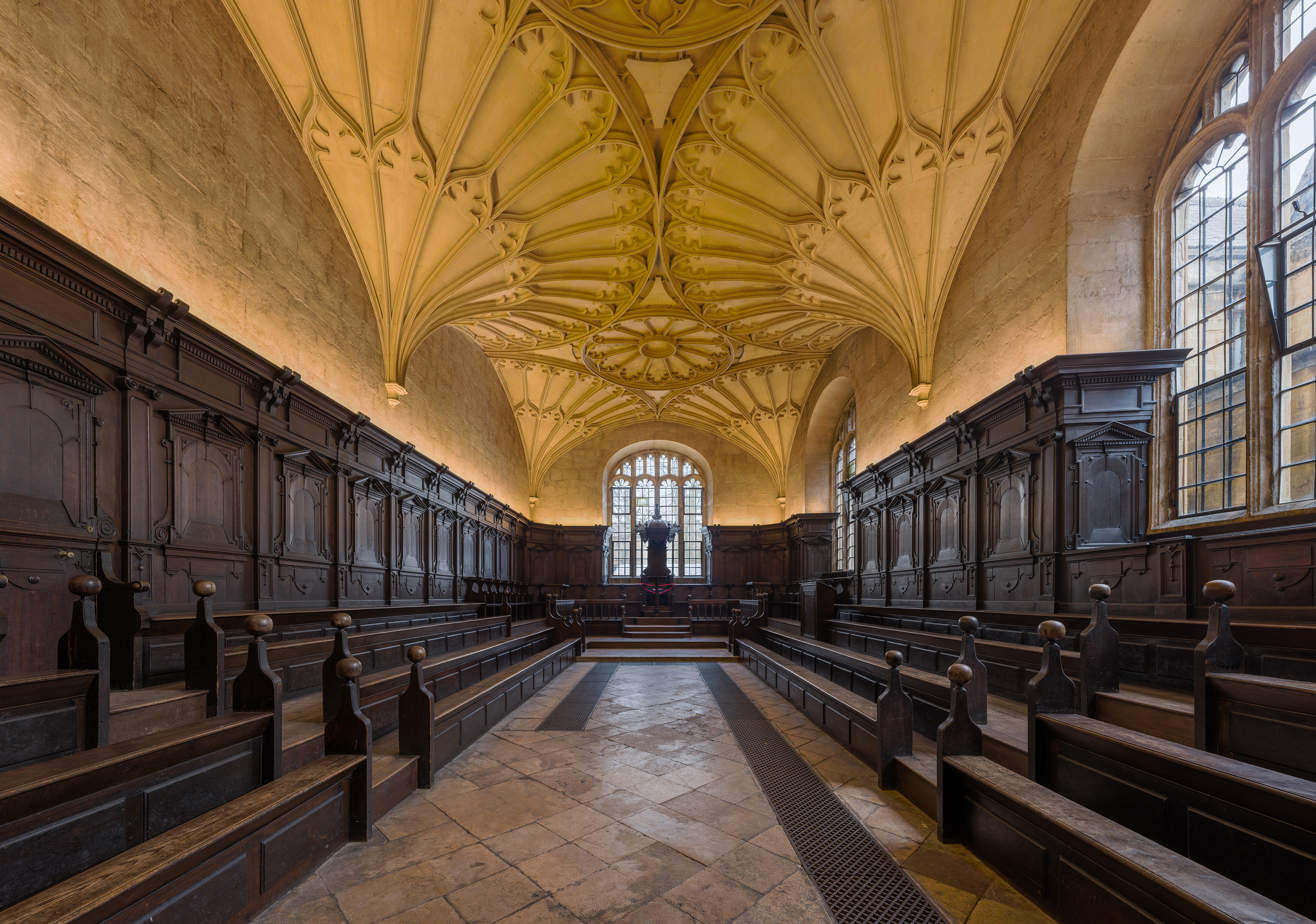
Interior of Convocation House, Oxford, the meeting place of the university's convocation

At universities, "convocation" can refer (particularly in North America) to a university's graduation ceremony or, more generally, to any formal assembly of the university (similar to congregation in some British universities). At Harvard University and Columbia University it is the name used for the matriculation ceremony that formally welcomes new students at the start of the academic year.

At some universities in the UK and other countries, convocation refers to the body of the members of the university that meets to make official decisions. In the University of Oxford, convocation was originally the main governing body of the university, consisting of all doctors and masters of the university, but it now comprises all graduates of the university and its only remaining functions are to elect the chancellor of the university and the Professor of Poetry. (The equivalent body at Cambridge is the senate.)

At Durham University, convocation was established as the assembly of members of the university by the university's fundamental statue in 1835. Women were admitted to convocation from 1913. Durham's degrees were awarded at meetings of convocation until 1938, when this power was transferred to the senate and awards were instead made at congregations of the university. As of 2024, it consists of the chancellor, the vice-chancellor and warden, the deputy vice-chancellor and provost, the pro-vice-chancellors, graduates of the university who have registered as members of convocation, and other officers of the university appointed by the university's council. It appoints the chancellor of the university, most recently Fiona Hill on 28 November 2022, and receives the annual report of the university.

In the University of London, convocation, between its establishment in 1858 and its abolition in 2003, consisted of the university's graduates who were involved in the university's governance.

In New Zealand, universities have courts of convocation by which all graduates elect representatives to the institutions' governing bodies.

== Other uses ==
- Collective noun for eagles.
- A formal or ceremonial meeting (noun), or assembly.
- A meeting of companions of a Holy Royal Arch chapter.
