= Divinity School, Oxford =

Medieval building in the University of Oxford

Coordinates: 51.7541°N 1.2549°W

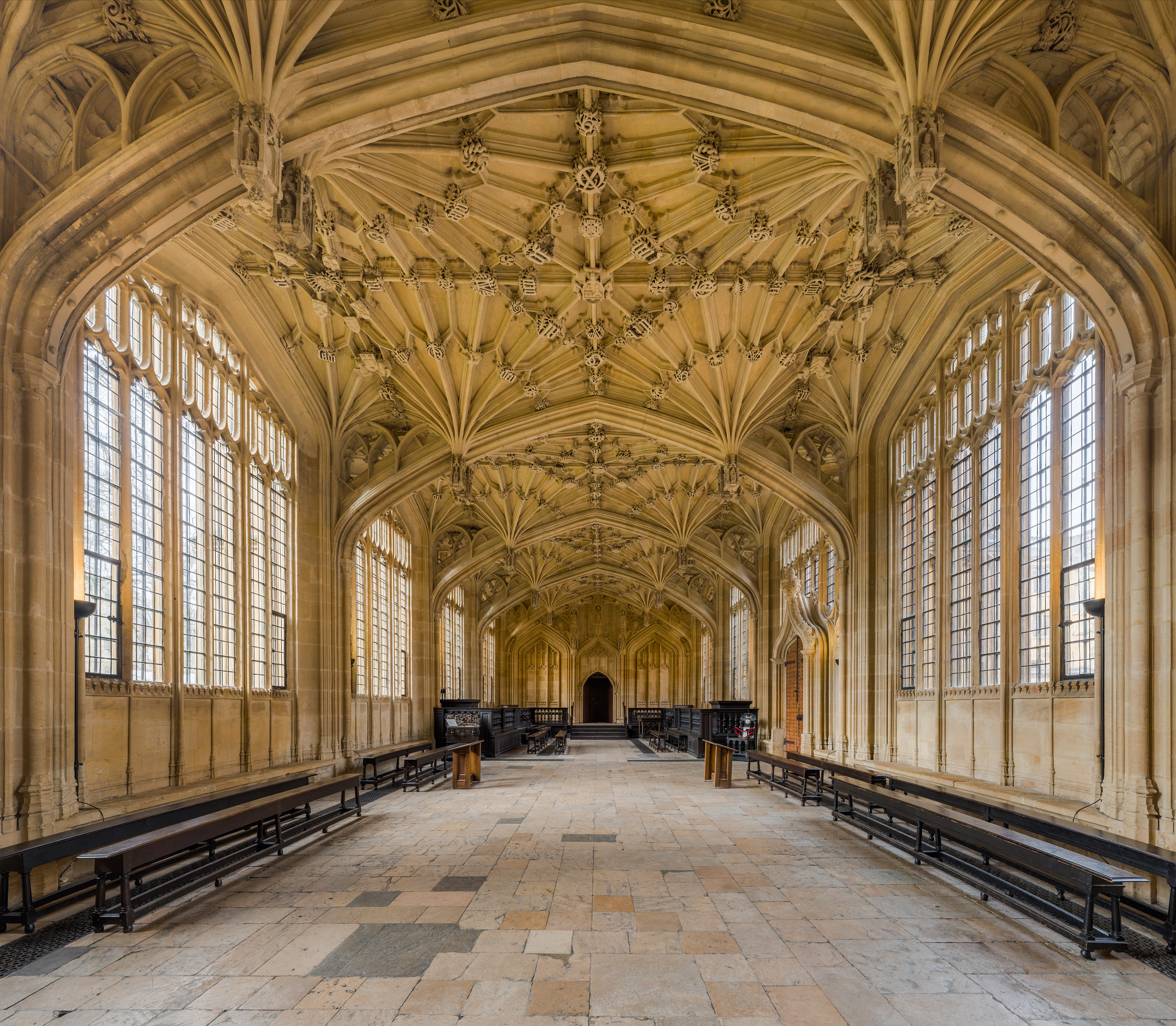
The interior of the Divinity School, looking west to the doorway of Convocation House

The Divinity School is a medieval building and room in the Perpendicular style in Oxford, England, part of the University of Oxford. Built between 1427 and 1483, it is the oldest surviving purpose-built building for university use, specifically for lectures, oral exams and discussions on theology. It is no longer used for this purpose, although Oxford does offer degrees in Theology and Religion taught by its Faculty of Theology and Religion.

The ceiling consists of very elaborate lierne vaulting with bosses (455 of them), designed by William Orchard in the 1480s.

The building is physically attached to the Bodleian Library (with Duke Humfrey's Library on the first floor above it), and is opposite the Sheldonian Theatre where students matriculate and graduate. At the far end from the Bodleian Library entrance, a door leads to Convocation House (built 1634–7).

Gallery of images

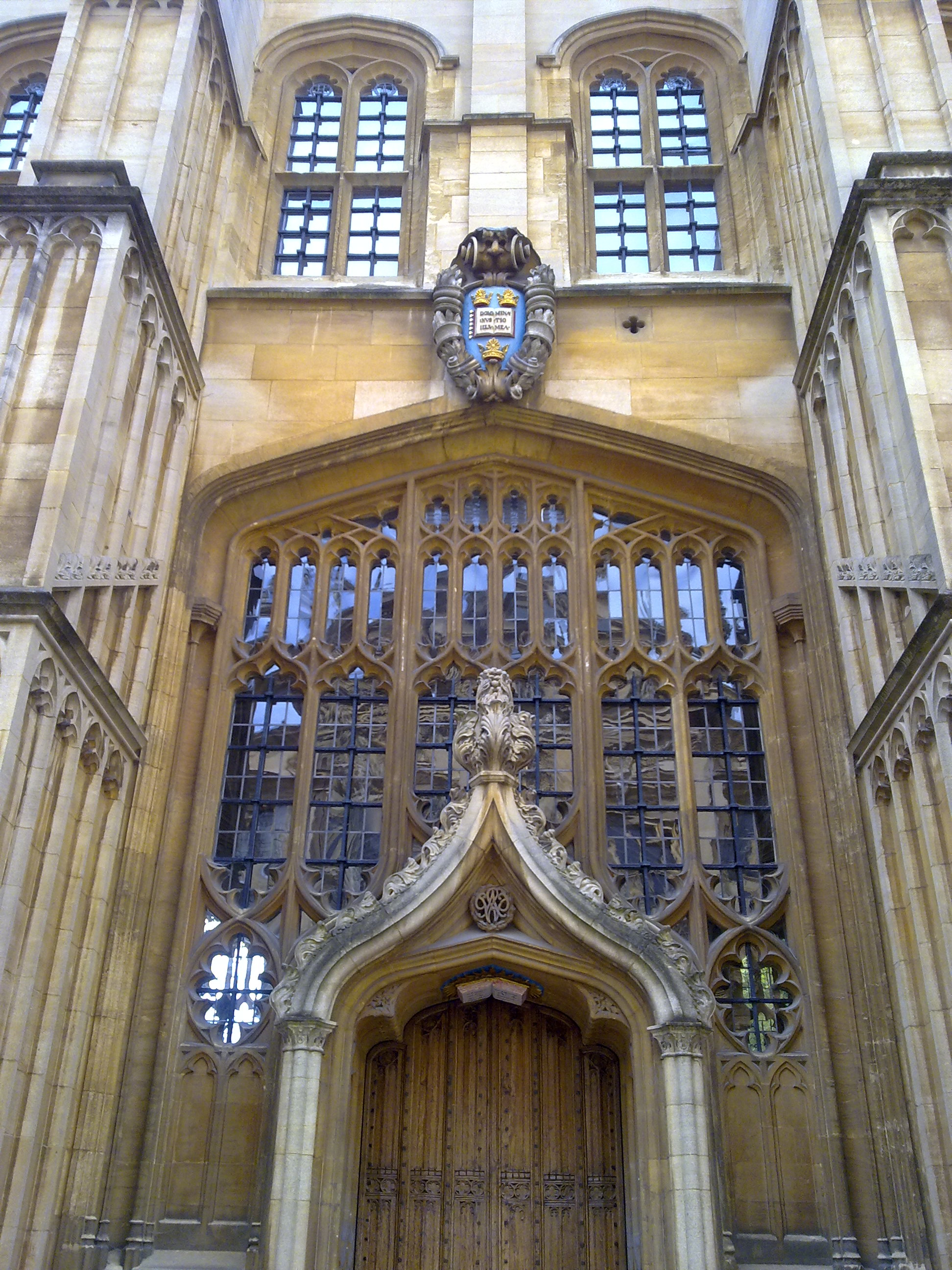
The external door, added by Christopher Wren in 1669 for access to the Sheldonian Theatre, mounted with the University coat of arms.

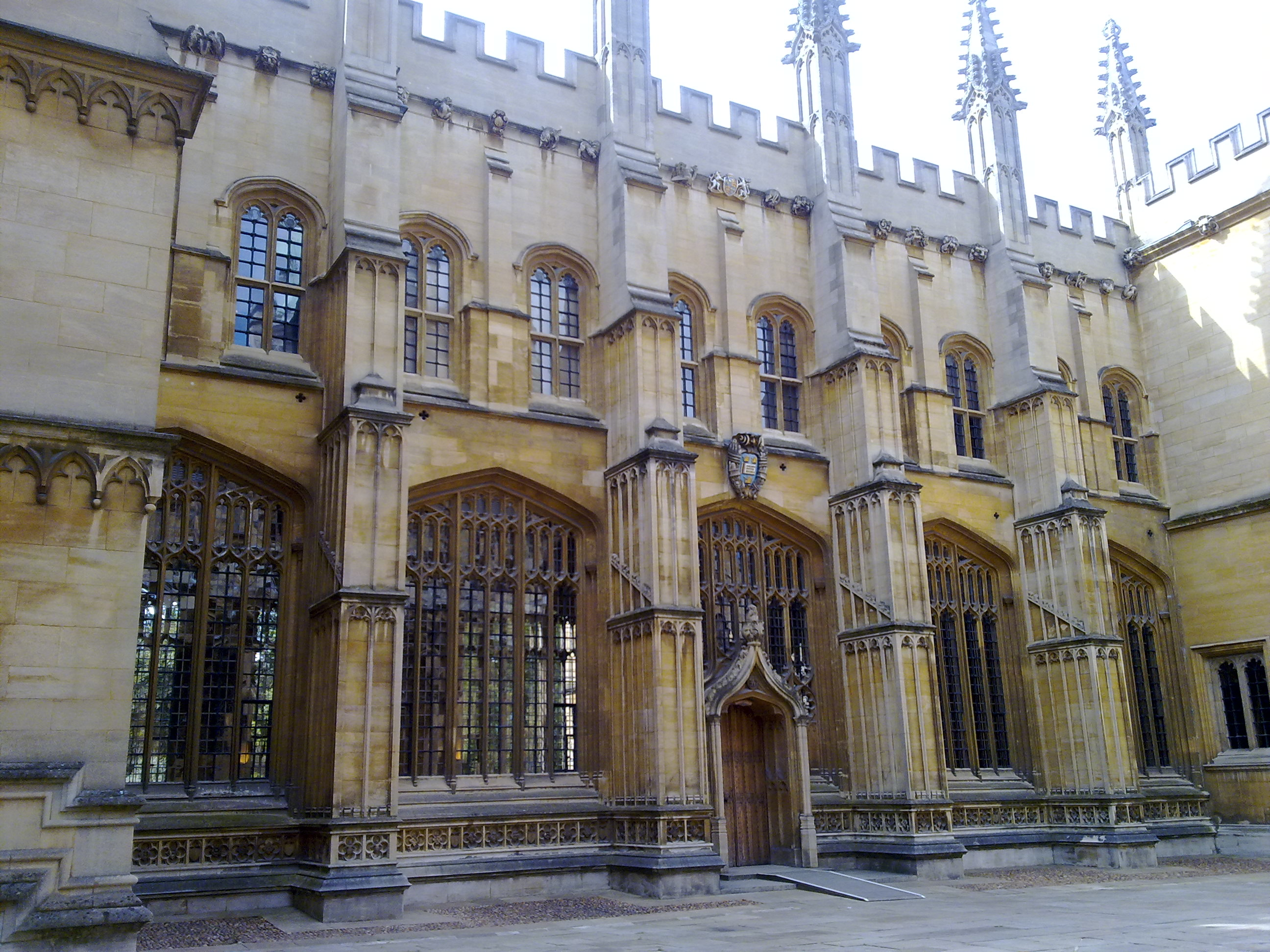
View of the north face of the Divinity School, Oxford, facing the Sheldonian Theatre.

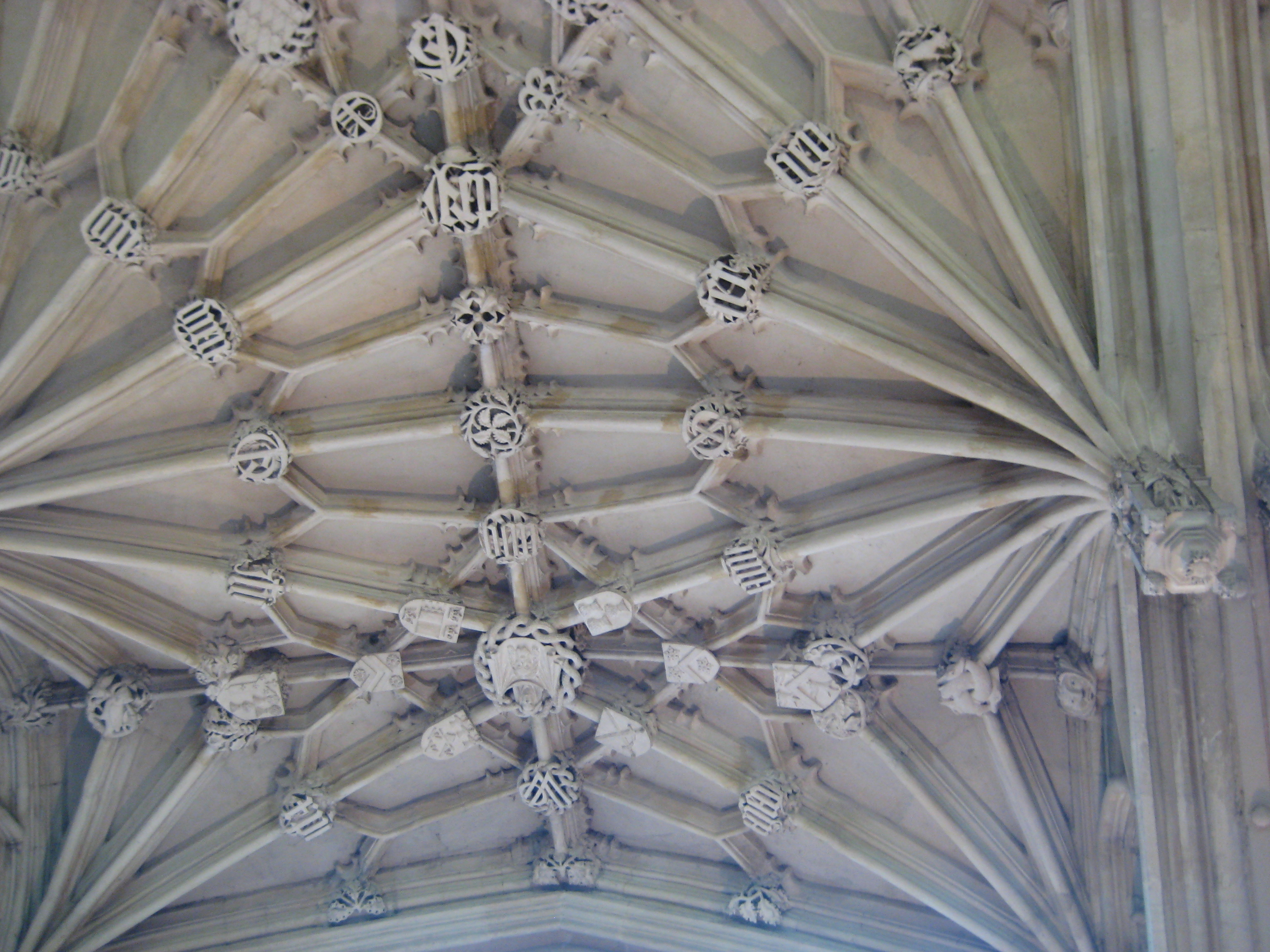
Divinity School ceiling with lierne vaulting in the Perpendicular style.

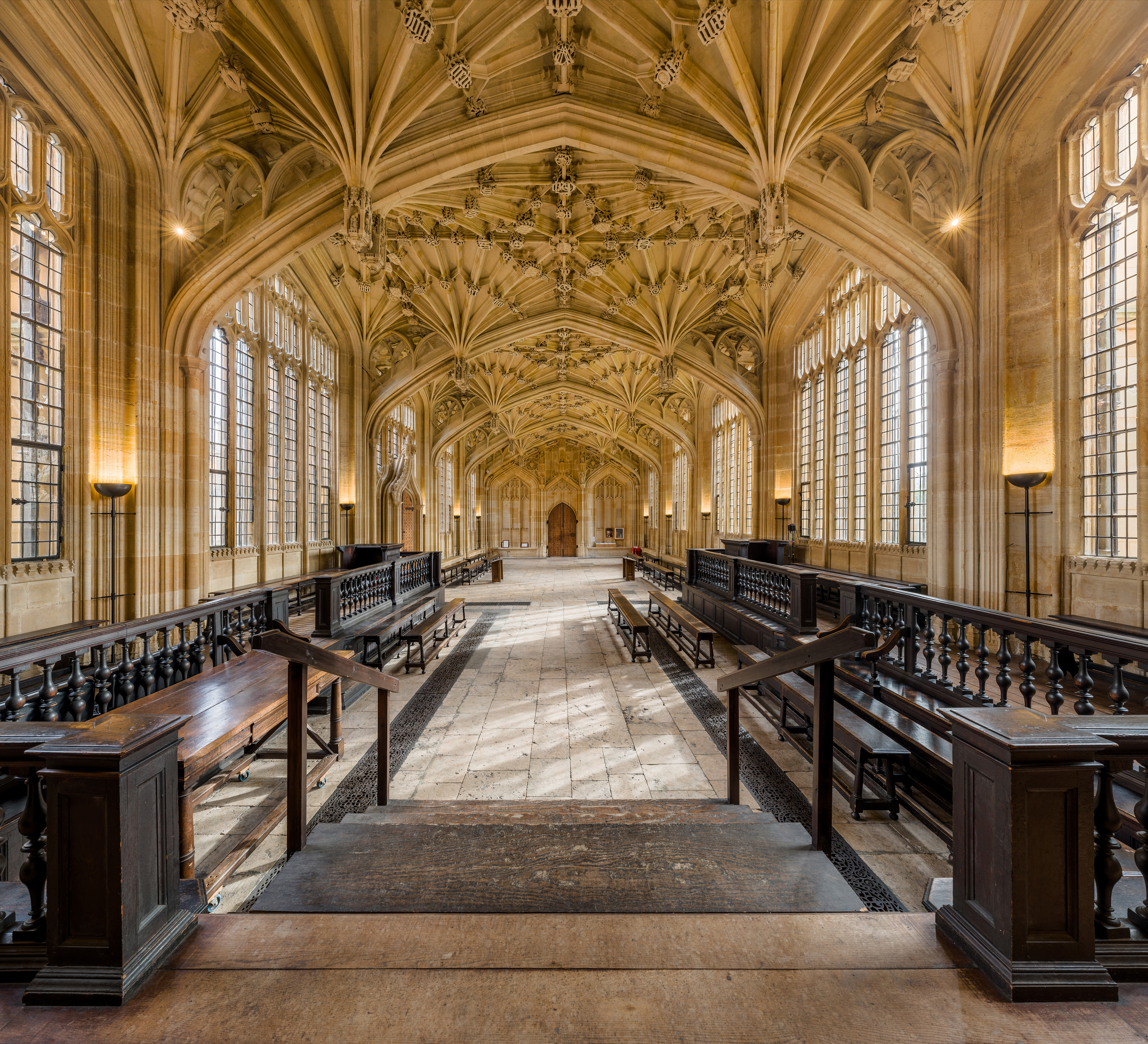
Looking east from the doorway of Convocation House towards the entrance to the courtyard.
