= Convocation House =

Building in Oxford, England

Coordinates: 51.754000°N 1.25525°W

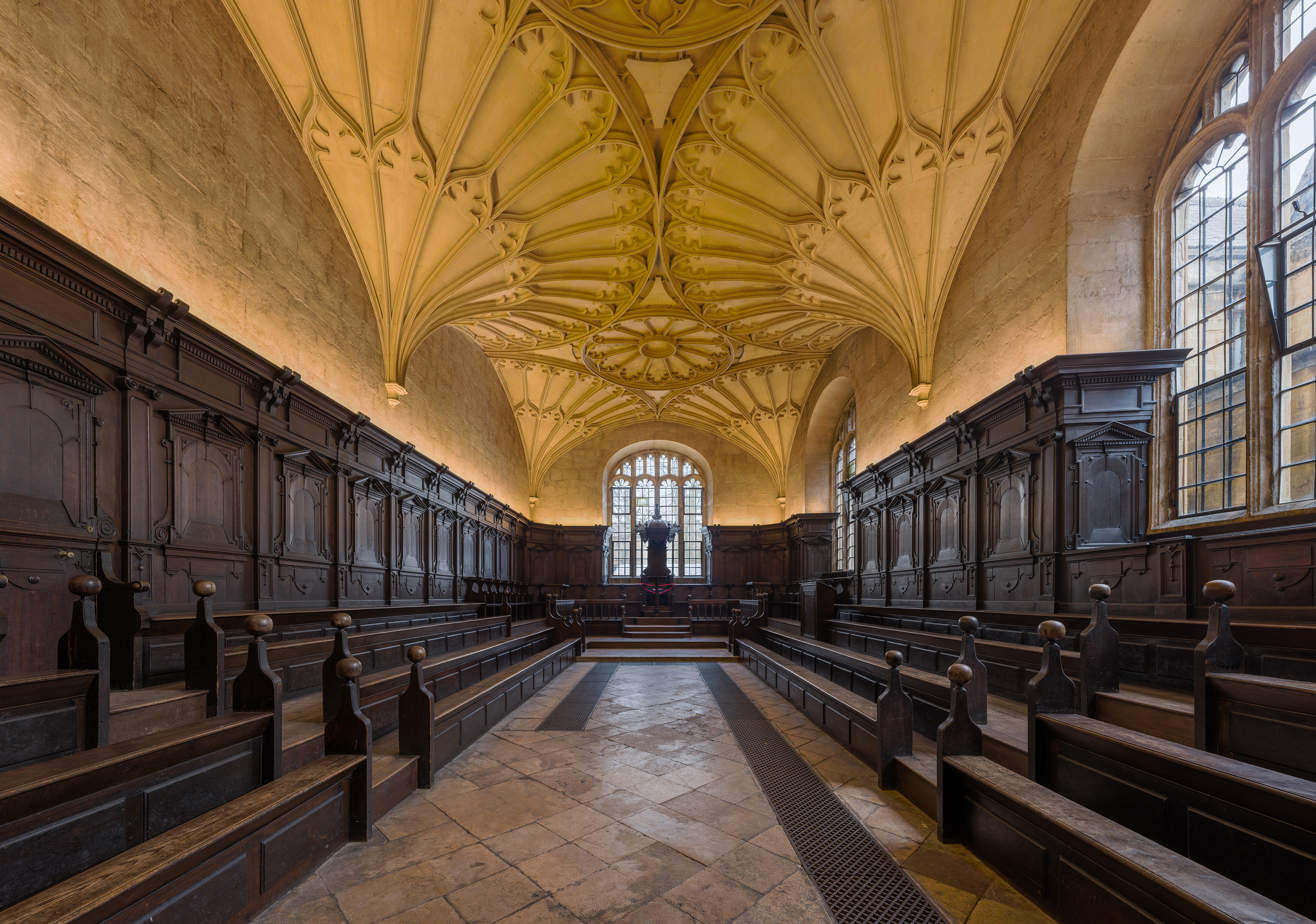
The interior of Convocation House, which was formerly a meeting chamber for the House of Commons during the English Civil War and later in the 1660s and 1680s.

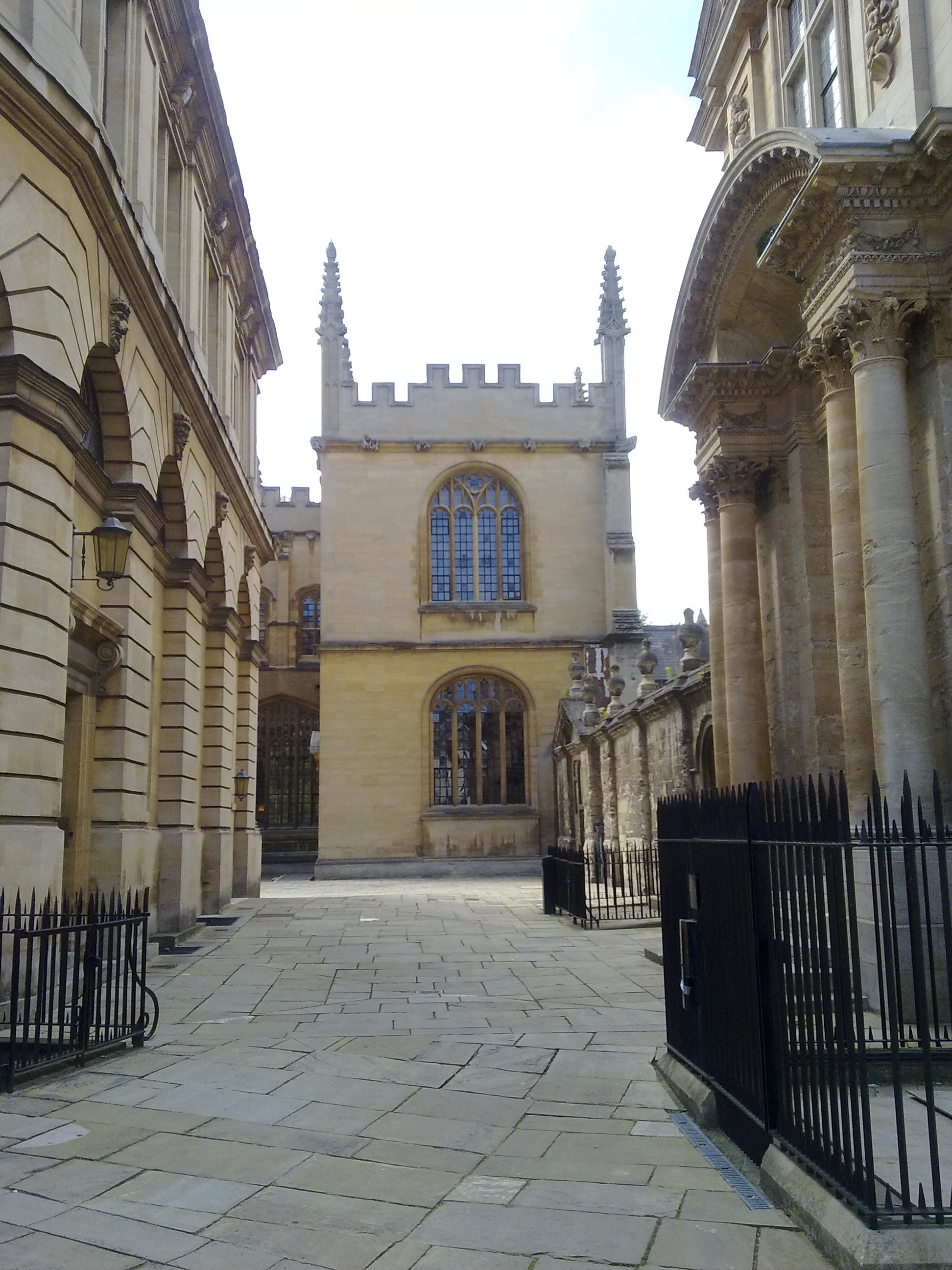
The exterior of Convocation House, from the north, adjacent to the Sheldonian Theatre (left) and the Old Ashmolean (right).

Convocation House is the lower floor of the 1634–1637 westward addition to the University of Oxford's Bodleian Library and Divinity School in Oxford, England. It adjoins the Divinity School, which pre-dates it by just over two hundred years, and the Sheldonian Theatre, to its immediate north.

== History ==
=== Seventeenth-century origins ===
The entire westward section was originally known as Selden End, in recognition of the gift of books from the lawyer John Selden which occupy the portion of the Bodleian Library housed above. In 1665 and 1681, during the reign of Charles II, the chamber served as home for the Royalist Members of the English Parliament. Its present stone-vaulted ceiling dates from 1758 to 1759.

=== Present ===
Convocation House is used for meetings of the University of Oxford's Convocation, but may be hired as a venue for civil weddings and partnership ceremonies, for which it, like the Divinity School and Chancellor's Court, is licensed, renewal of vows, wedding blessings, wedding receptions, and conferences.
