= University Parks =

Parkland area northeast of the city centre in Oxford, England

Coordinates: 51.762°N 1.253°W

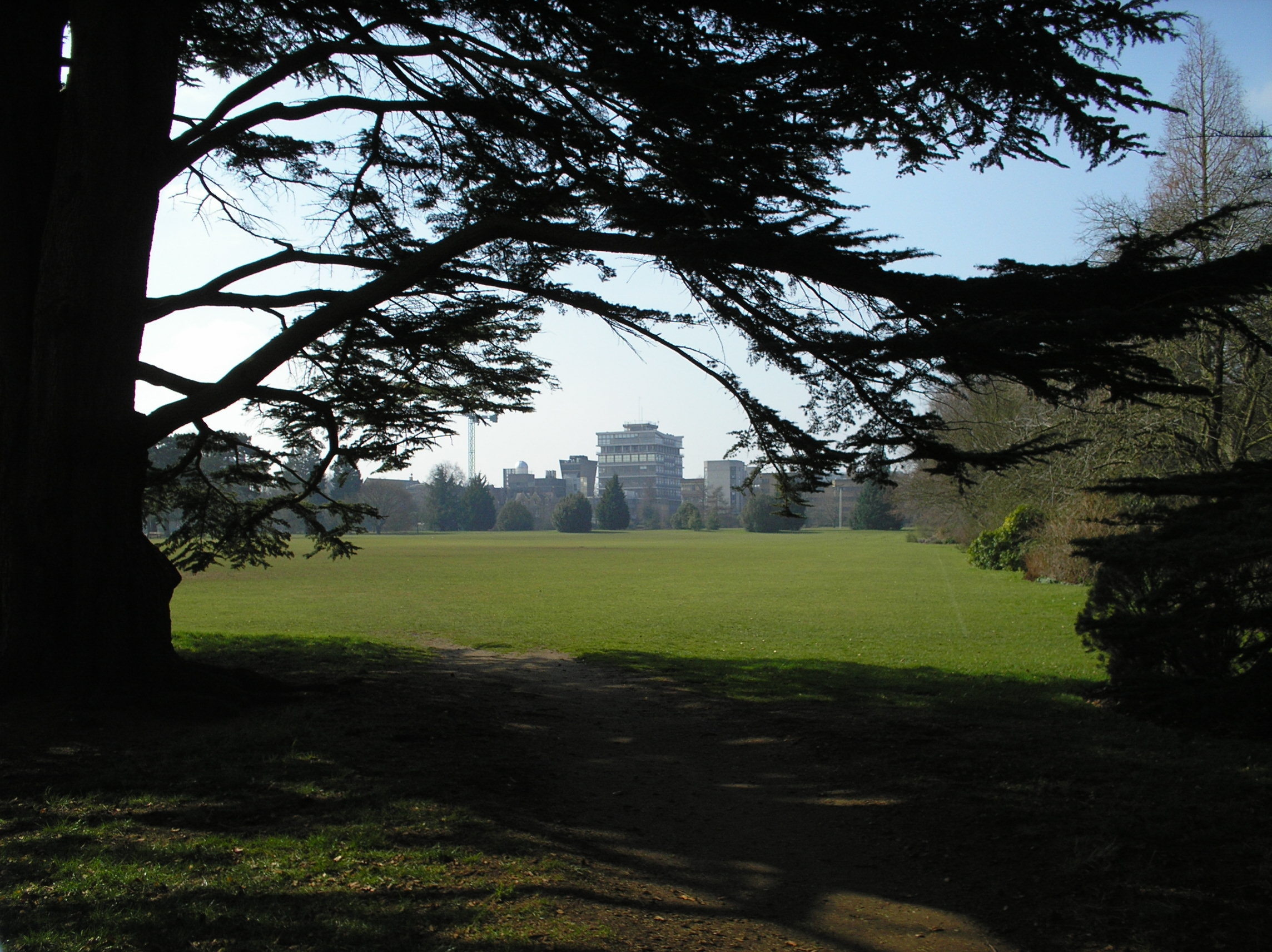

- The University Parks, to the north-east of Oxford city centre
- Type: Public park
- Location: Oxford, England
- Area: 74 acres (30 ha)
- Owner: University of Oxford

The Oxford University Parks, commonly referred to locally as the University Parks, or just The Parks, is a large parkland area slightly northeast of the city centre in Oxford, England. The park is bounded to the east by the River Cherwell, though a small plot of land called Mesopotamia sits between the upper and lower levels of the river. To the north of the parks are Norham Gardens (with large houses including Gunfield backing onto the park) and Lady Margaret Hall, to the west the Parks Road, and the Science Area on South Parks Road to the south. The park is open to the public during the day, and has gardens, large sports fields, and exotic plants. It includes a cricket ground used by Oxford University Cricket Club.

== History ==
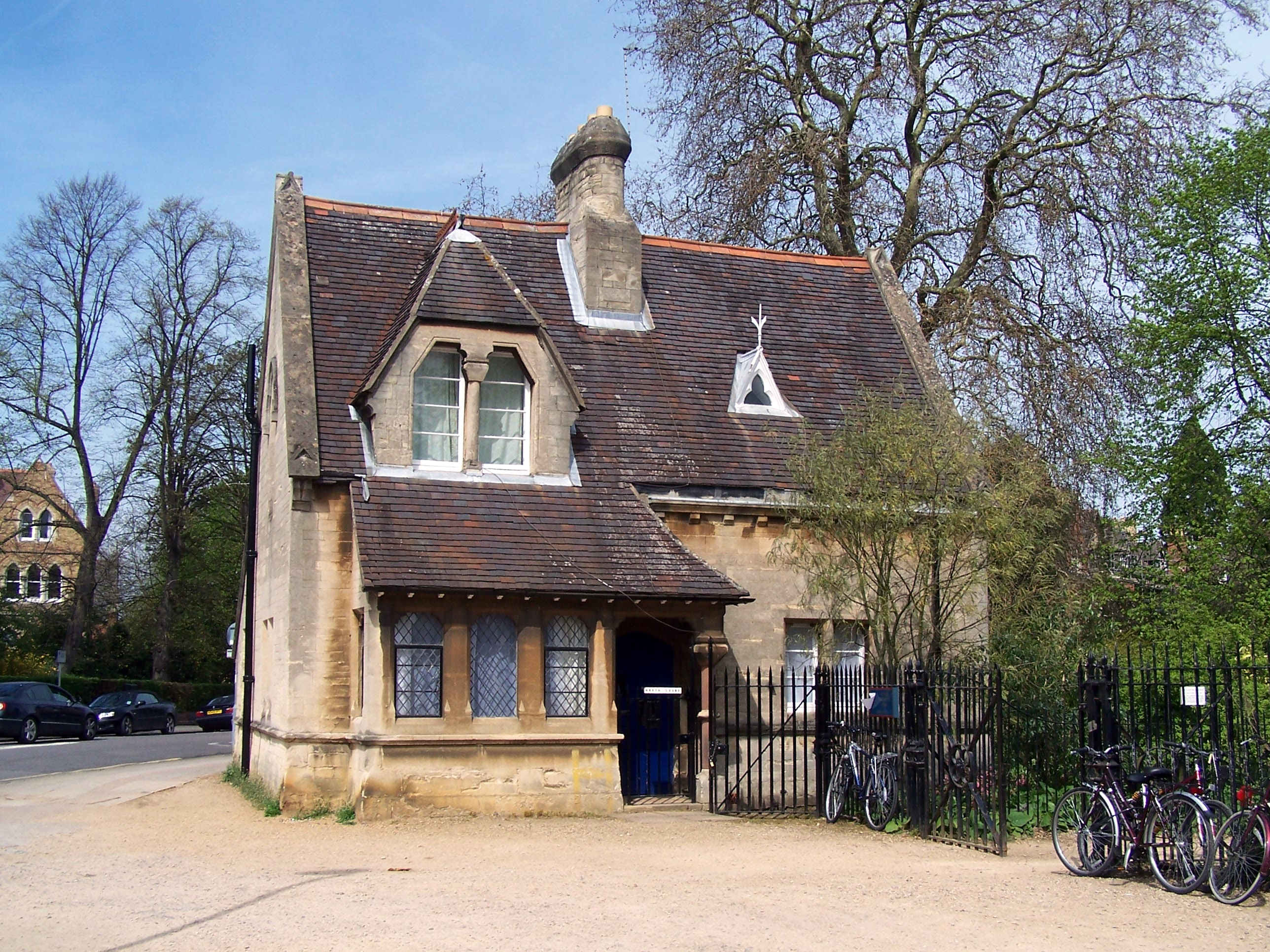
North Lodge, at the entrance to the Parks where Norham Gardens meets Parks Road

Part of the land on which the Parks is located had been used for recreation for a long time, and it formed part of the University Walks said to have been used by Charles II to walk his dog in 1685. The land originally belonged to Merton College, and in 1853/1854, the University of Oxford purchased 20 acres (8.1 ha) from Merton College to build the parks. Over an eleven-year period a total of 91 acres (37 ha) of land was eventually acquired. A portion of this land (4 acres) was set aside for the University Museum which was built between 1855 and 1860. Between 1912 and early 1950s, a further portion was used to build the Science Area, so the current site measures around 74 acres (30 ha).

The Parks was laid out in 1864, and the work was supervised by William Baxter, who was later appointed the first superintendent of the parks in 1866. Parts of the Parks were designated to be used for sports and recreational purposes. 25 acres of the land had been set aside as the University Cricket Grounds, and the cricket pavilion was built in 1881. The Parks is also used for other sports such as rugby football, hockey, lacrosse, tennis and croquet. The rest of The Parks was designed as an arboretum, and the first trees were planted in 1865. A number of other features have been added over the years.

Dan Winter has been superintendent of the Parks since 2017, replacing Walter Sawyer.

Since August 2020, Michelle Cooper has taken over as acting superintendent.

A 5 km parkrun event launched on 5 February 2022 in University Parks. University Parks parkrun takes place at 9am every Saturday morning, starting at the Tentorium in the centre of the Parks.

== Cricket ground ==
The Parks
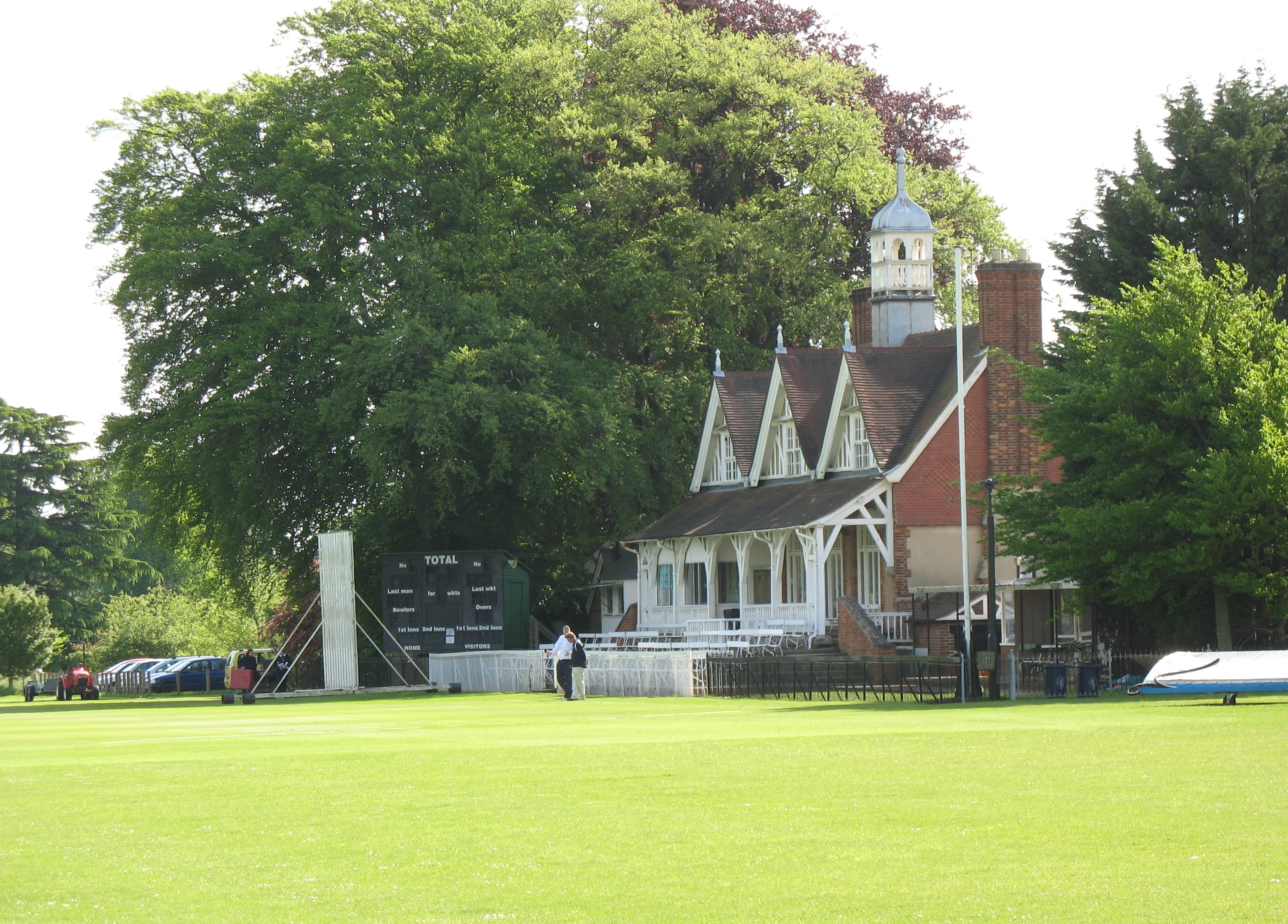
- Interactive map of The Parks

Ground information
- Location: Oxford, England
- Country: England
- Establishment: 1881
- Owner: Oxford University
- End names
- Pavilion End; Norham Gardens End

Team information
Oxford University Cricket Club	(1881 – present)
- As of 1 May 2016; Source: CricketArchive

The Parks has been the home ground of Oxford University Cricket Club since 1881. The cricket ground at The Parks was secured through the Master of Pembroke, Evan Evans obtaining a lease on 10 acres of land there in 1881. The pavilion was designed by Thomas G. Jackson, architect of many nineteenth- and early twentieth-century Oxford buildings, including the University's Examination Schools. The building has three gables, the central one containing the clock, and is topped by a cupola 'of almost absurd height' and weather-vane. The pavilion contains a Long Room.

Before moving to The Parks, the University Cricket Club played on the Magdalen Ground and Bullingdon Green. The Magdalen Ground was used from the University Cricket Club's first match in 1829 to 1880 while Bullingdon Green was used for two matches in 1843.

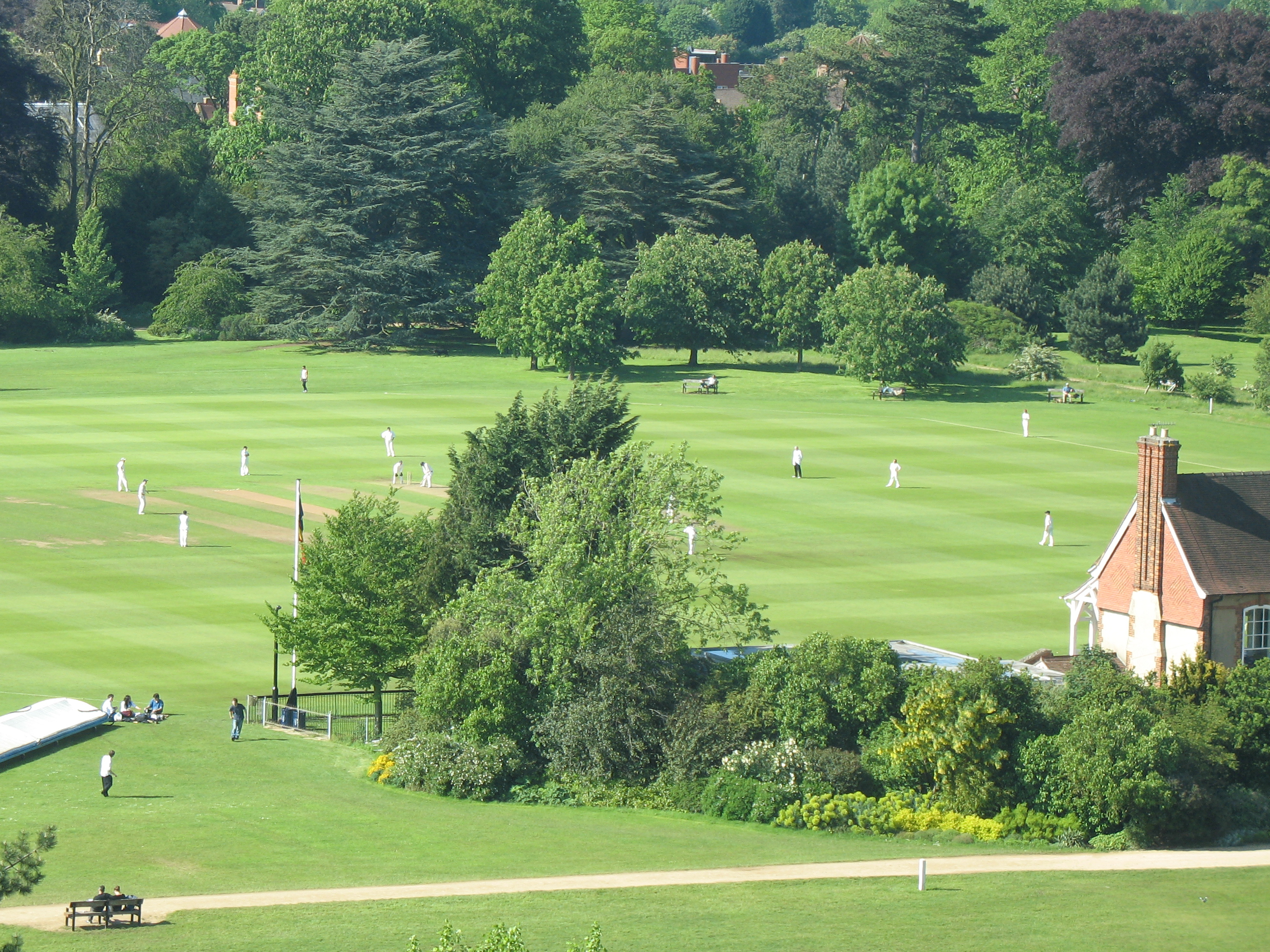
A cricket game at The Parks

The cricket ground was the only first-class cricket ground in the UK where spectators could watch free of charge as admission cannot be charged for entry into the Parks. The club has therefore occasionally taken major matches to three other grounds in Oxford. The most used is the Christ Church Ground, which hosted 37 matches between 1878 and 1961. Twenty-one of these matches were against the Australians, played between 1882 and 1961. The club also used New College Ground for two matches in 1906 and 1907 against Yorkshire and the South Africans respectively. One match in 1912 against the South Africans was played at the Magdalen Ground. The club has also played certain minor matches at the Merton College Ground, the St Edward's School Ground and the St Catherine's College Ground.

The Parks was the venue for Durham's inaugural first-class match when they played Oxford University there in April 1992.

The Parks has been, since 2000, home to the ECB Oxford University Centre of Cricketing Excellence, a partnership between the University of Oxford, Oxford Brookes University and the England and Wales Cricket Board. Prior to the 2010 season, the UCCE was rebranded as Oxford Marylebone Cricket Club University (MCCU). The University Match against Cambridge is the only one in which a true Oxford University Cricket Club team takes part: i.e., composed entirely of current Oxford students.

From 2002 to 2018, The Parks hosted the first-class Varsity Match in even-numbered years. The last first-class match at The Parks was the 2019 Oxford MCCU vs Hampshire, before the end of first-class university cricket in 2020, with the 2020 Varsity Match being played at Fenners. The Parks also hosted two List A matches for the club and twenty-two matches for the Combined Universities in the Benson & Hedges Cup between 1973 and 1998.

== Points of interest ==
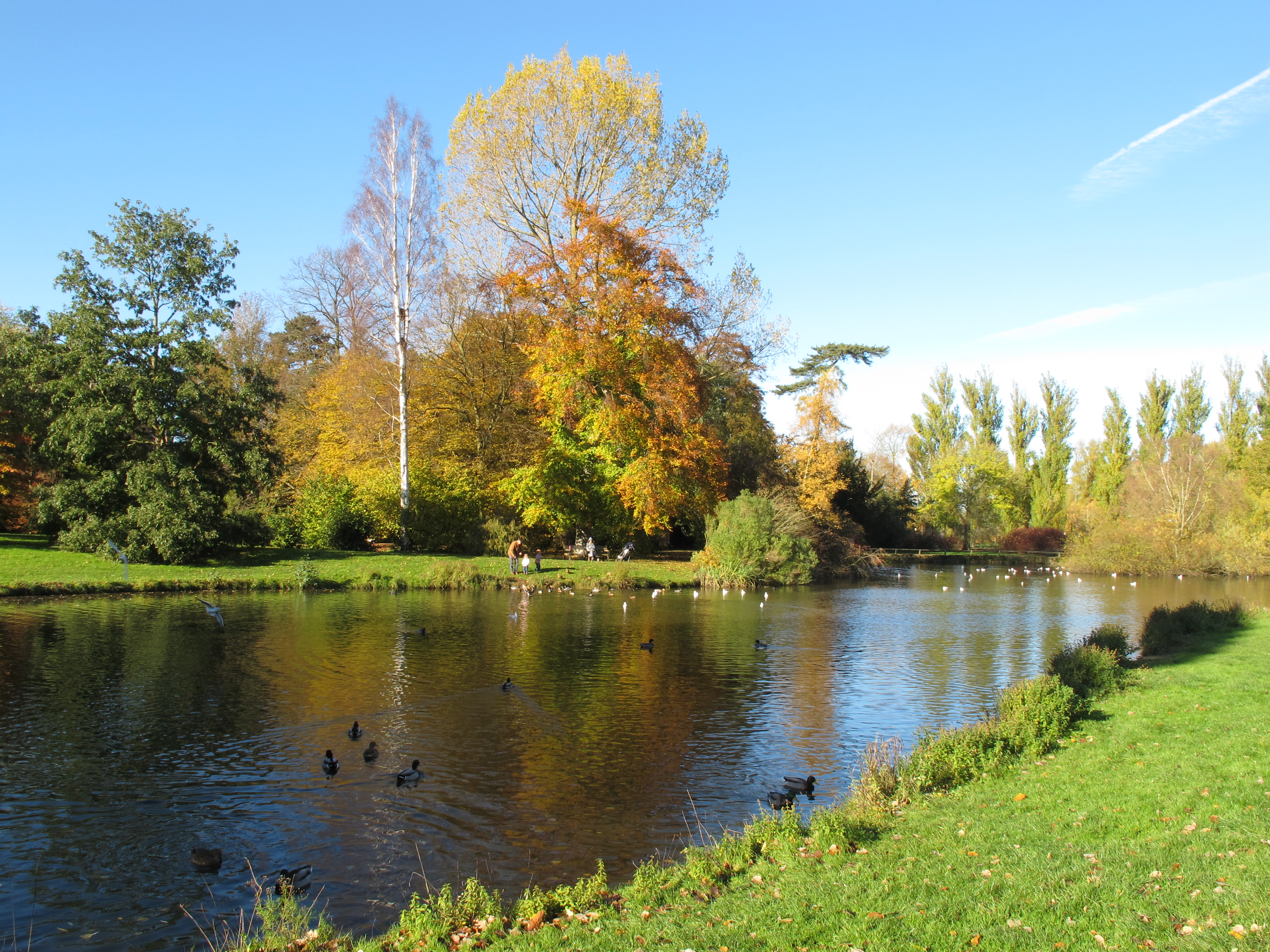
The duck pond in the Parks.

The following features of the Parks are of special interest:

- Cricket pavilion — the pavilion was designed by Sir Thomas Jackson. The cricket ground and pavilion are used by the Oxford University Cricket Club. The two ends of the pitch are the Pavilion End and the Norham Gardens End.
- Seven large giant sequoias planted in about 1888.
- A duck pond with water lilies and a small island, constructed in 1925.
- High Bridge, built during 1923–24 as a relief project for the unemployed. It is usually called Rainbow Bridge, because of its shape.
- Genetic Garden — an experimental garden established by Professor Cyril Darlington to demonstrate evolutionary processes.
- Styphnolobium japonicum, known as the Japanese Pagoda Tree. Planted in 1888.
- Coronation Clump, a clump of trees planted to commemorate the coronation of Queen Elizabeth II in 1953.
- Parson's Pleasure, once used as a secluded nude bathing area, but now closed and forms part of the park.

== Gallery ==
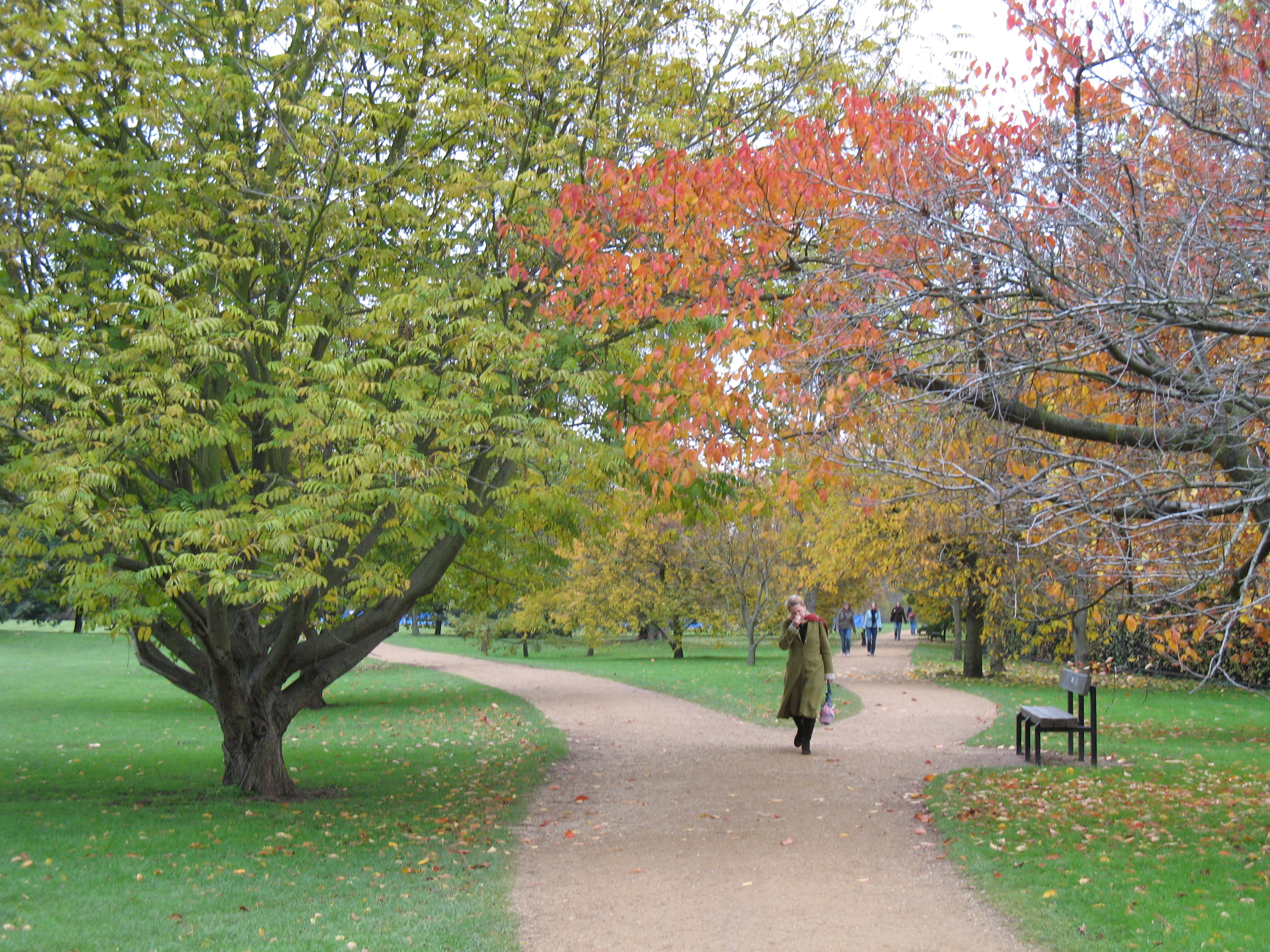
Gravel paths in the Parks

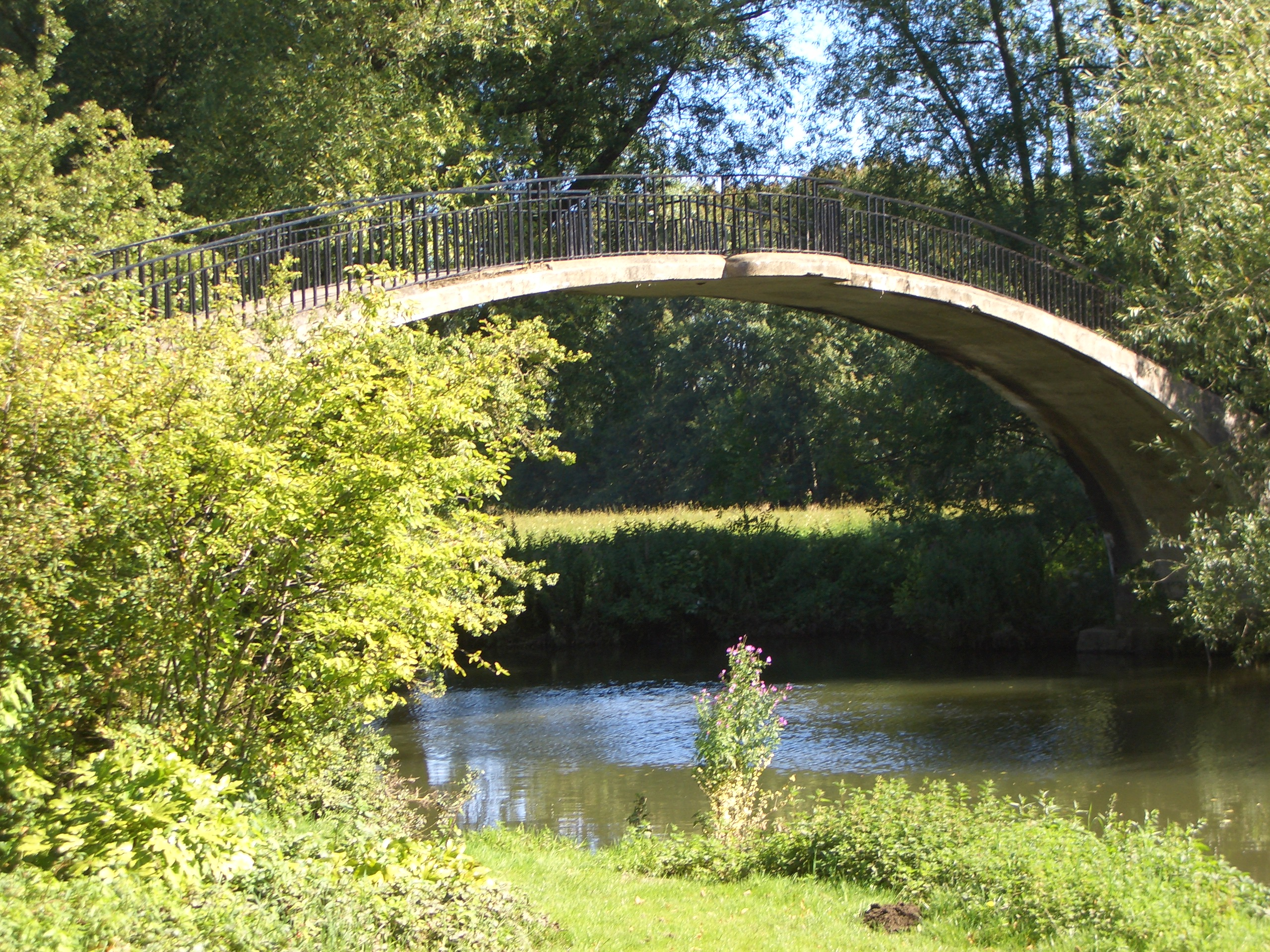
Rainbow Bridge

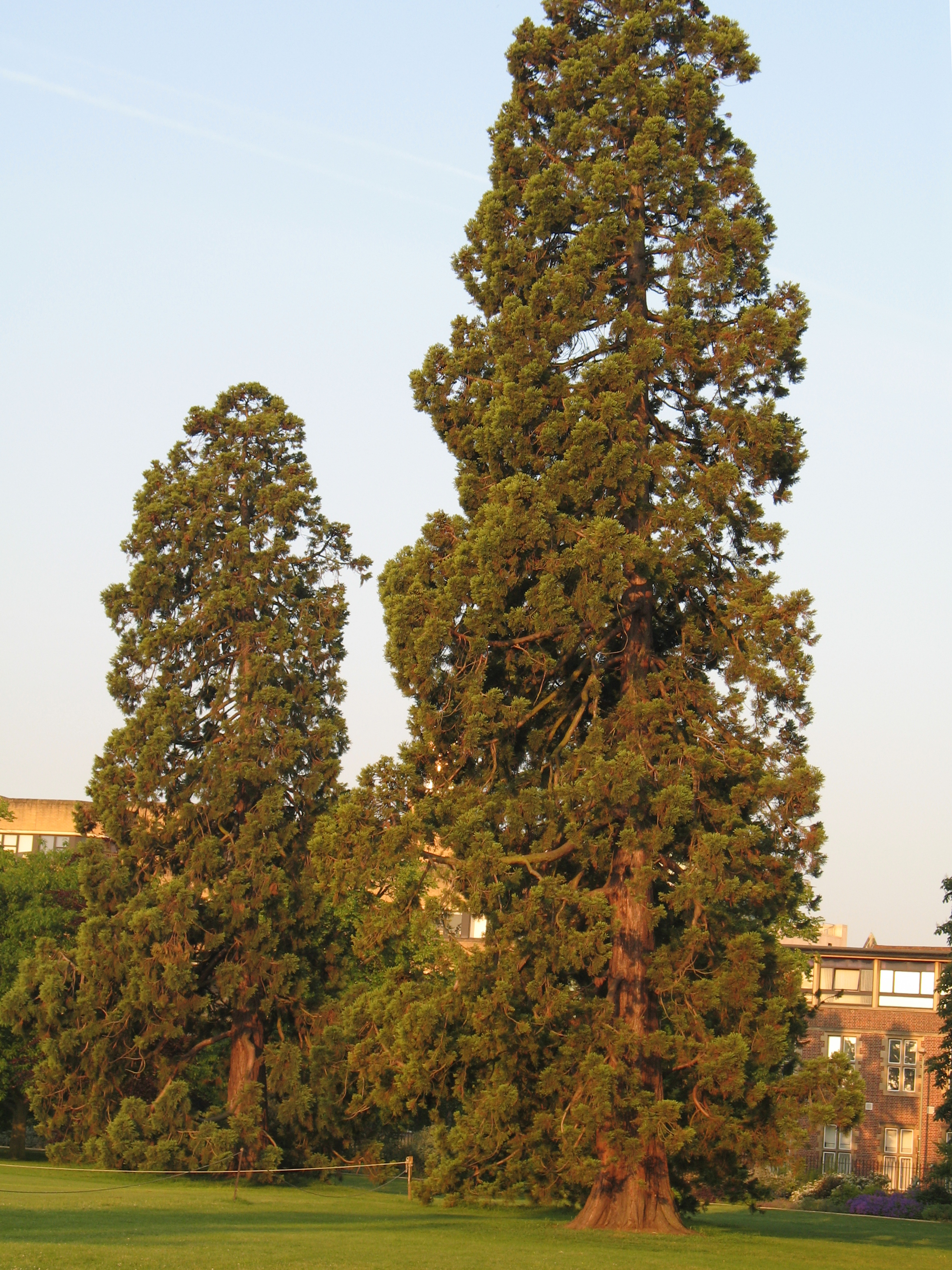
Sequoia trees

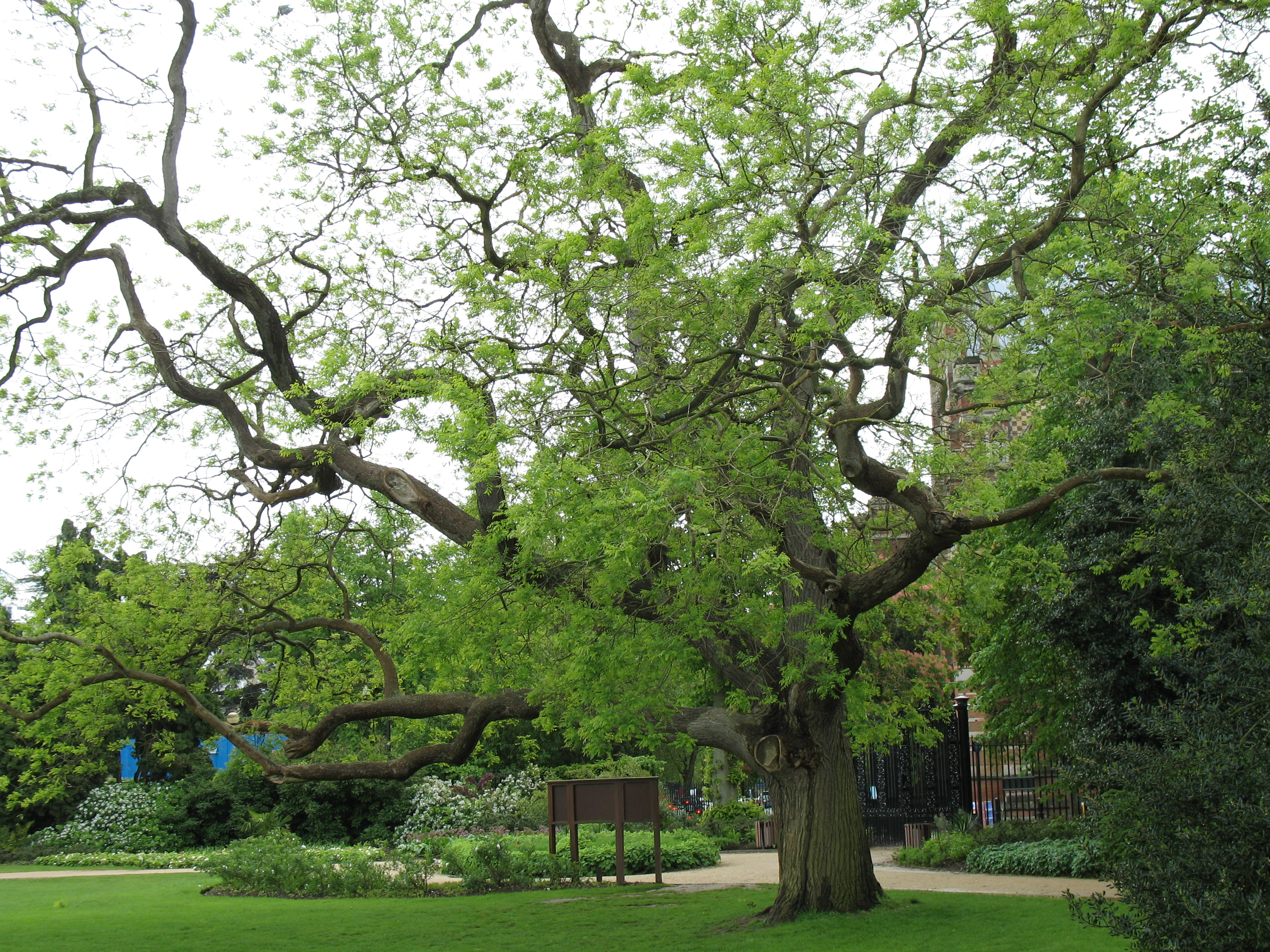
Japanese Pagoda Tree

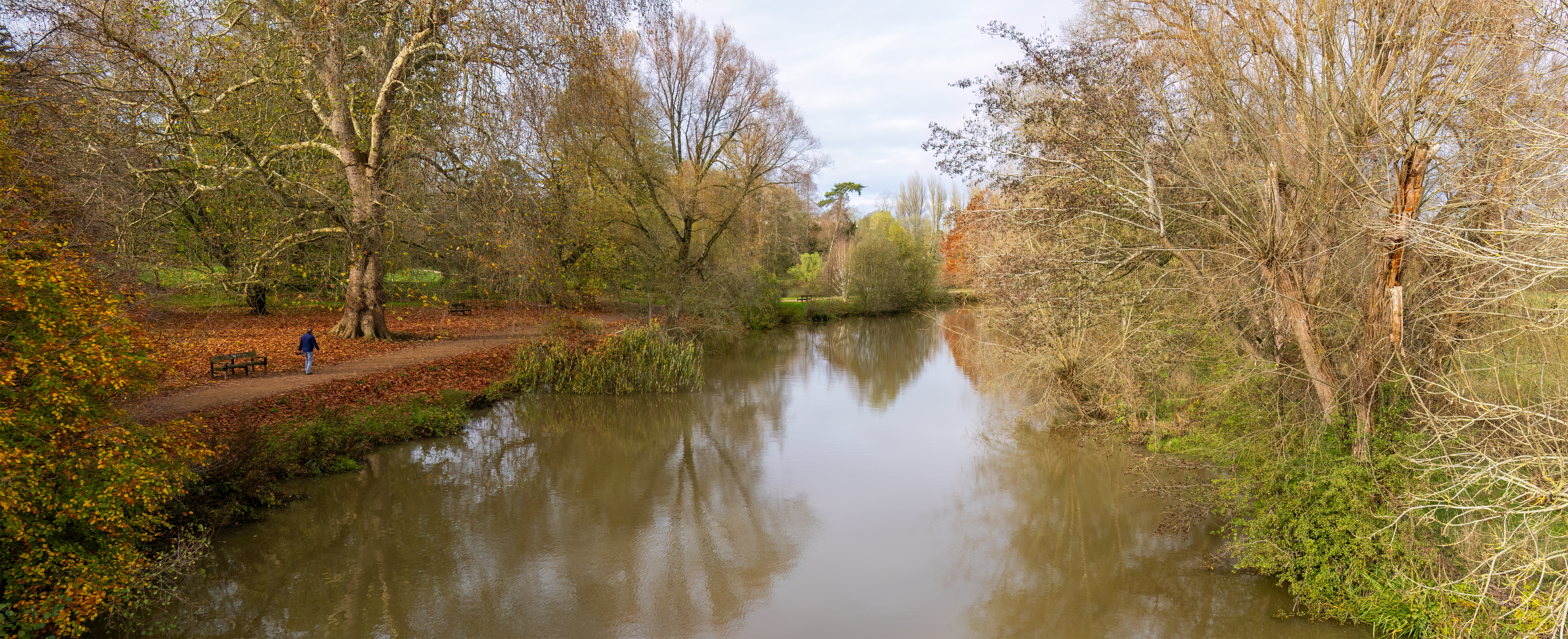
River Cherwell running through the park

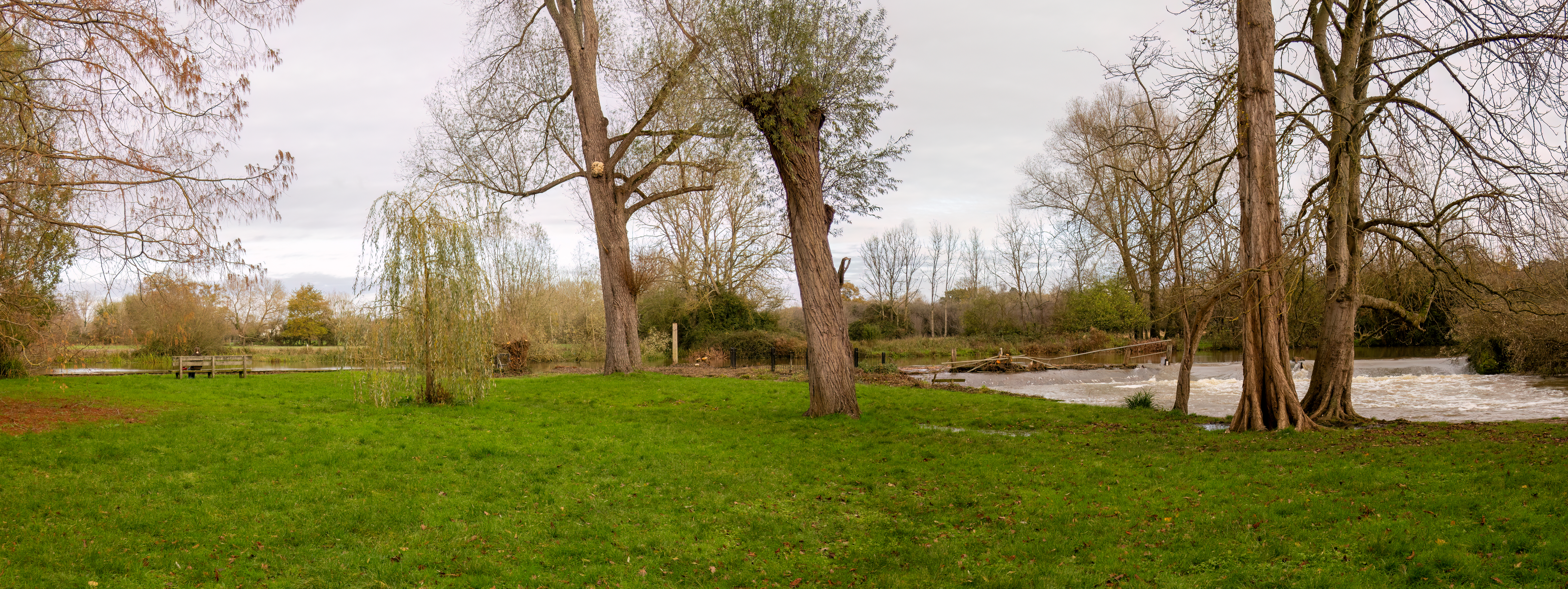
Parson's Pleasure

== See also ==
- Dame's Delight
- Norham Manor estate
- Fenner's, where first-class cricket is played in Cambridge
