= Tumbling Bay =

Outdoors bathing area in Oxford

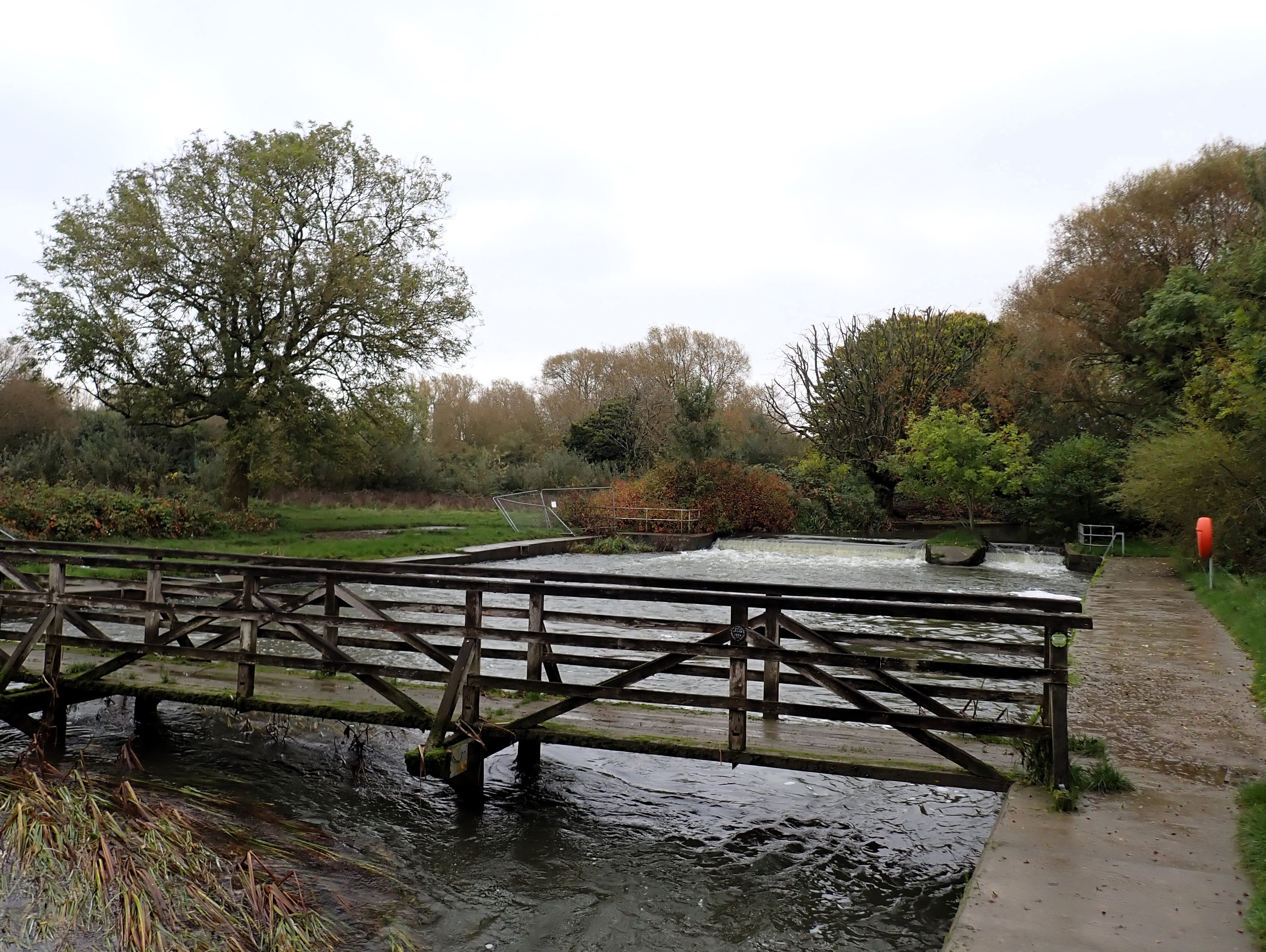
- Interactive map of the Tumbling Bay area

General information
- Type: Bathing Spot
- Location: Oxford
- Coordinates: 51°45′20″N 1°16′27″W
- Grid position: SP 502 065
- Opened: 1853
- Renovated: 1866
- Closed: 1990

Tumbling Bay, also known as Tum, is an outdoors bathing area in Oxford, England. Fed by the River Thames, the bathing spot opened in 1853 and closed formally in 1990. Subsequently, it has been known as a wild swimming location.

== Description ==
The Tumbling Bay bathing area is formed of two constructed concrete bathing areas, with steps, fed by the River Thames via the Bulstake Stream. Weirs at either end enable the water level to remain stable. Access to the bathing area is either via the Thames itself, or by a path from Botley Park. Downstream the waterway feeds into the Isis. It is also known locally as "Tum".

== History ==
Tumbling Bay was the second, after Fiddler's Island near Port Meadow, public bathing space in Oxford to be authorised by the County Council. It opened in 1853, originally for men only, and was extended in 1866. The men-only status lasted until 1892 when women, in an historic first for Oxford, were granted permission by the council to bathe free of charge. Facilities included a changing room and toilets.

In 1881 John Salter, in his book The River Thames: A Guide, stated the Tum was a "fine public bathing place". Its most popular year was 1947, when 86,000 people visited the bathing spot. Archaeological investigations, conducted in 2019 in preparation for a fish ladder, identified 16 structures on the site. These included locker room and toilet facilities, a guard house, and toll house and ferry house to the east for crossing the River Thames.

Tumbling Bay was closed officially in 1990, though swimmers often used it subsequently, and the concrete pools and the foundations of the changing rooms remained. In 2021, due to the ongoing collapse of the northern concrete bank, the area was closed off to the public due to health and safety concerns. In 2022 the Tumbling Bay Preservation Society was formed. In December 2025 Tumbling Bay was reopened to the public, following works to resolve safety issues including the replacement of degraded infrastructure.

=== Incidents ===
A 17-year-old youth died while bathing in Tumbling Bay in June 1895. In 2007 the body of a 15-year-old boy was found at Tumbling Bay, after falling into the River Thames in Port Meadow. In 2010 a 29-year-old man, Daniel Lewis, died while swimming at the spot.

== See also ==
- Parson's Pleasure
- Dame's Delight
- Botley Road
