= Dame's Delight =

Swimming place for women

Coordinates: 51.761°N 1.247°W

Dame's Delight was a place for women to bathe on the bank of the River Cherwell in the meadows near the Oxford University Parks opposite Mesopotamia Walk in Oxford, England.

The site existed from 1934 to 1970, when it closed because of maintenance difficulties caused by flooding.

A similar bathing area Parson's Pleasure for nude male bathing, also existed nearby until 1991. It had been established at a much earlier date; both sites are now part of the folklore of Oxford University.

Dame's Delight inspired the title of a 1964 novel by Margaret Forster.

== See also ==
- Tumbling Bay
