= Botley Park =

West Oxford Park

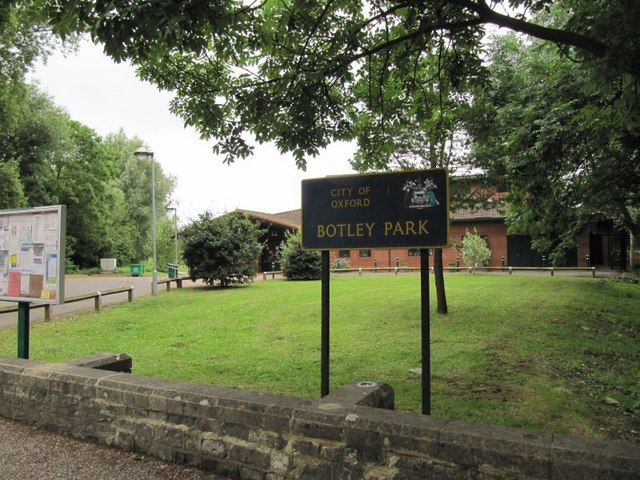
- Interactive map of Botley Park
- Nearest city: Oxford, England
- OS grid: SP 500 064
- Coordinates: 51°45′14″N 1°16′35″W
- Area: c. 4.7 ha
- Opened: 1922
- Owner: Oxford City Council
- Website: www.oxford.gov.uk/directory-record/45/botley-park

Botley Park is a public park in West Oxford, England. Located off Botley Road, it features a bowls club, tennis courts and a children's playground. The park also provides access to the Tumbling Bay bathing area.

== Overview ==
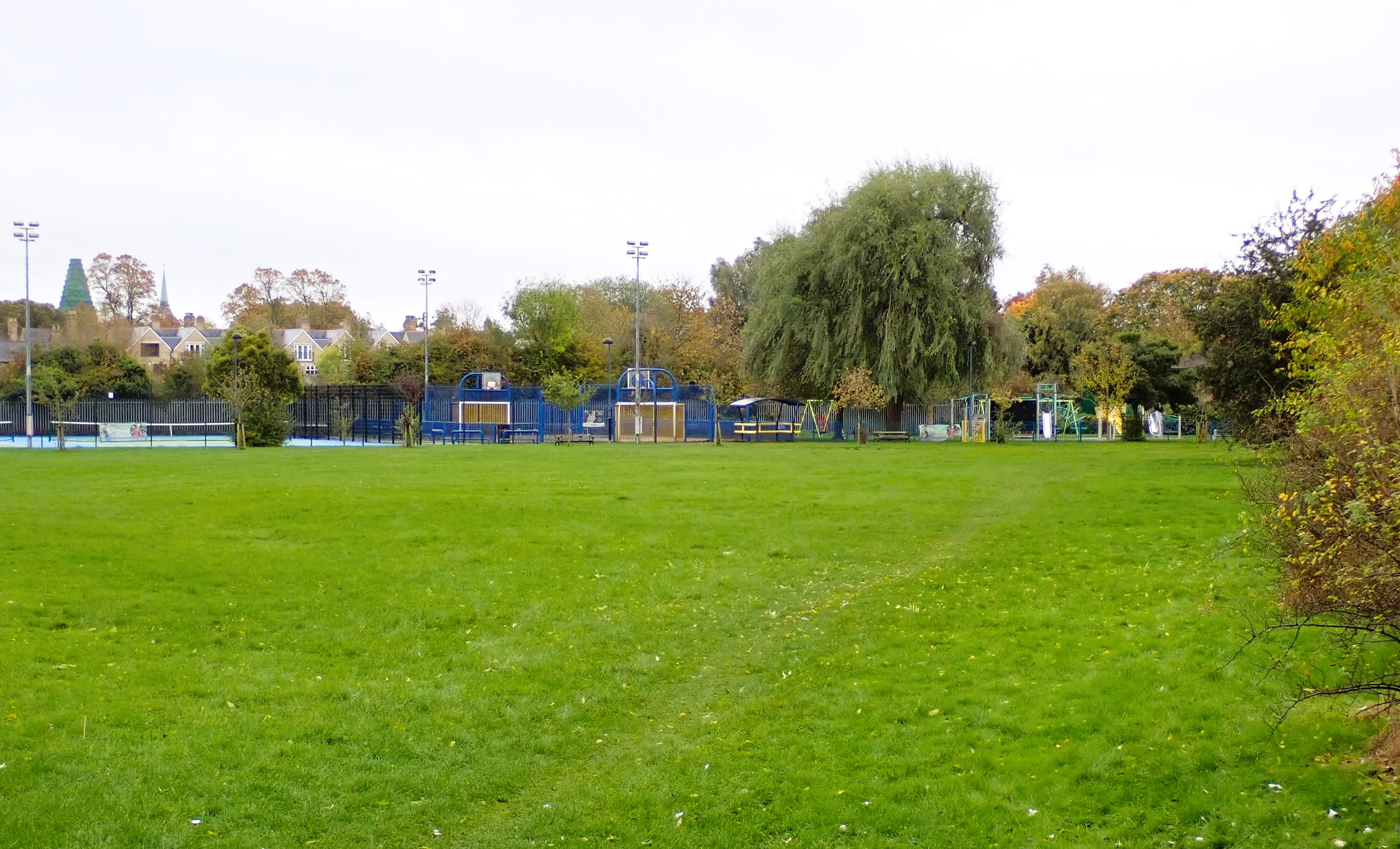
View of Botley Park, October 2024

The park is located off Botley Road, behind the West Oxford Community Centre. It was established in 1922 by the Oxford City Council to provide a leisure and recreation area for the burgeoning population in the western area of Oxford. It covers c. 4.7 hectares and comprises low-lying land, including playing fields, that is known to flood.

The north-western side of the park is known as Kingfisher Corner, an area of shrubs and small trees that is used for wildlife spotting. The Tumbling Bay outdoors bathing area, established in 1853 but not in operation since 1990, is a swimming spot fed by the River Thames. Located adjacently to the north-east, the only available access is via Botley Park.

=== Facilities ===
The West Oxford Bowls Club (WOBC), established in 1924, is located in Botley Park. It features six rinks. In 2024, the centenary celebrations of the club were negatively affected due to significant flooding.

The park features public tennis courts. In 2023 the Lawn Tennis Association funded an upgrade to the courts, including resurfacing and a new access arrangement, to increase engagement with the sport.

Located in the park environs is the West Oxford Community Centre, run by local charity the West Oxford Community Association (WOCA), which features a cafe. Other facilities include a children's playground, table tennis, and a multi sports games area.

=== Events ===
The park is used as a venue for events. These include hosting the Oxford Thai Festival, held in 2019, Oxford Festival of Nature in 2013, and the annual West Oxford Fun Day. The park is one of the venues for the annual Oxford Christmas Light Festival.
