= Parson's Pleasure =

Place for nude bathing in Oxford, England

Coordinates: 51°45′37″N 1°14′48″W

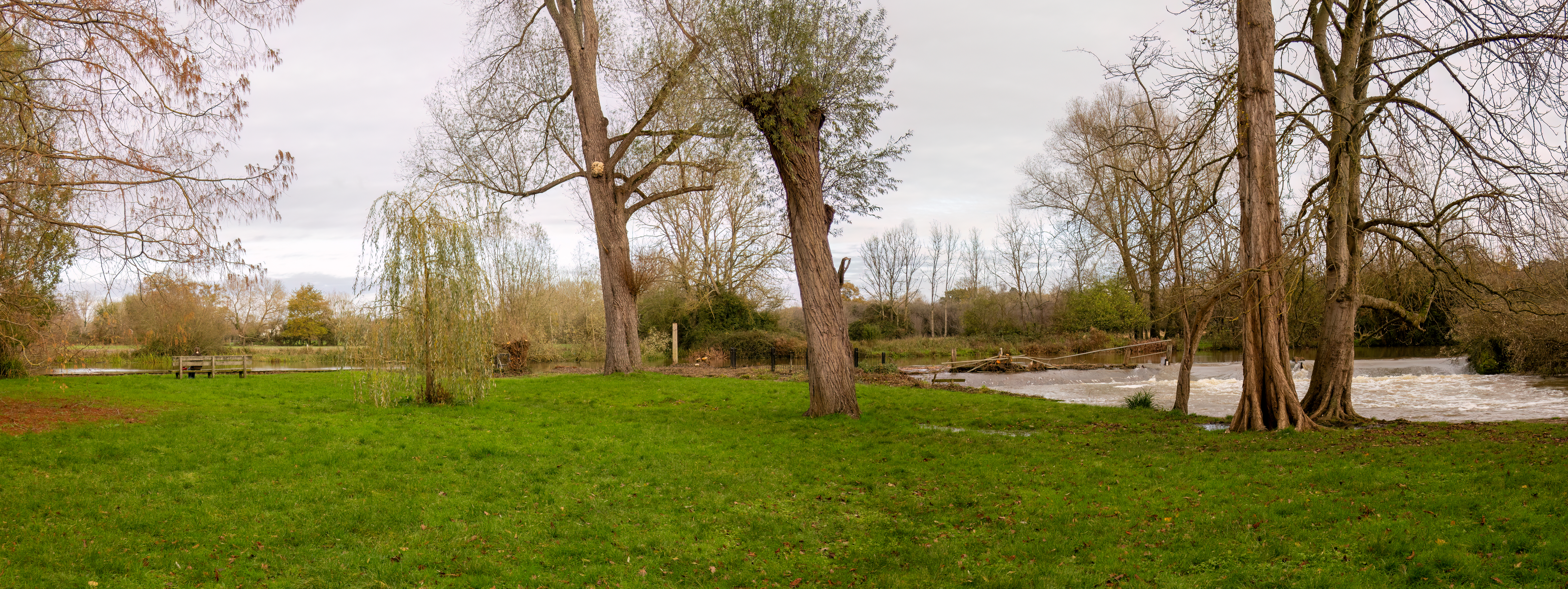
Panorama of Parson's Pleasure in 2025

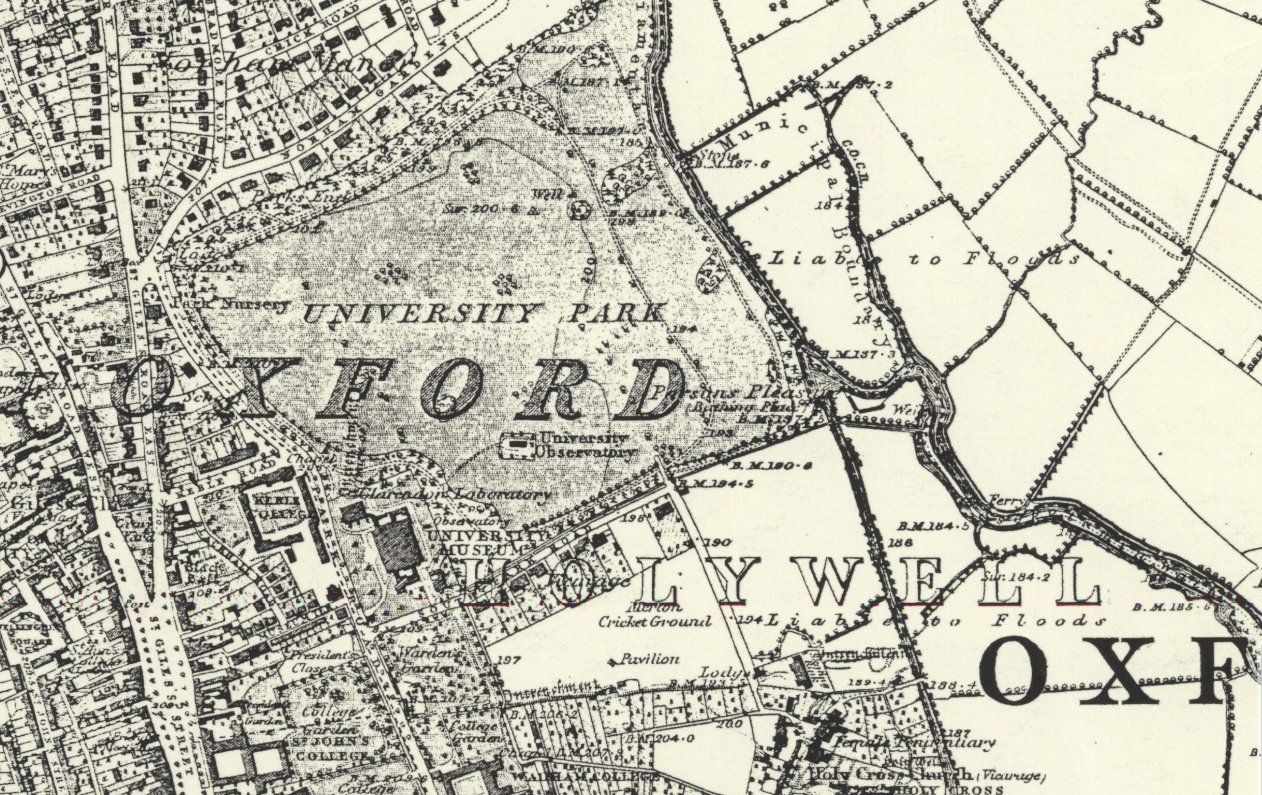
1876 Ordnance Survey map of Oxford showing The Parks with Parson's Pleasure bathing place in the south east corner.

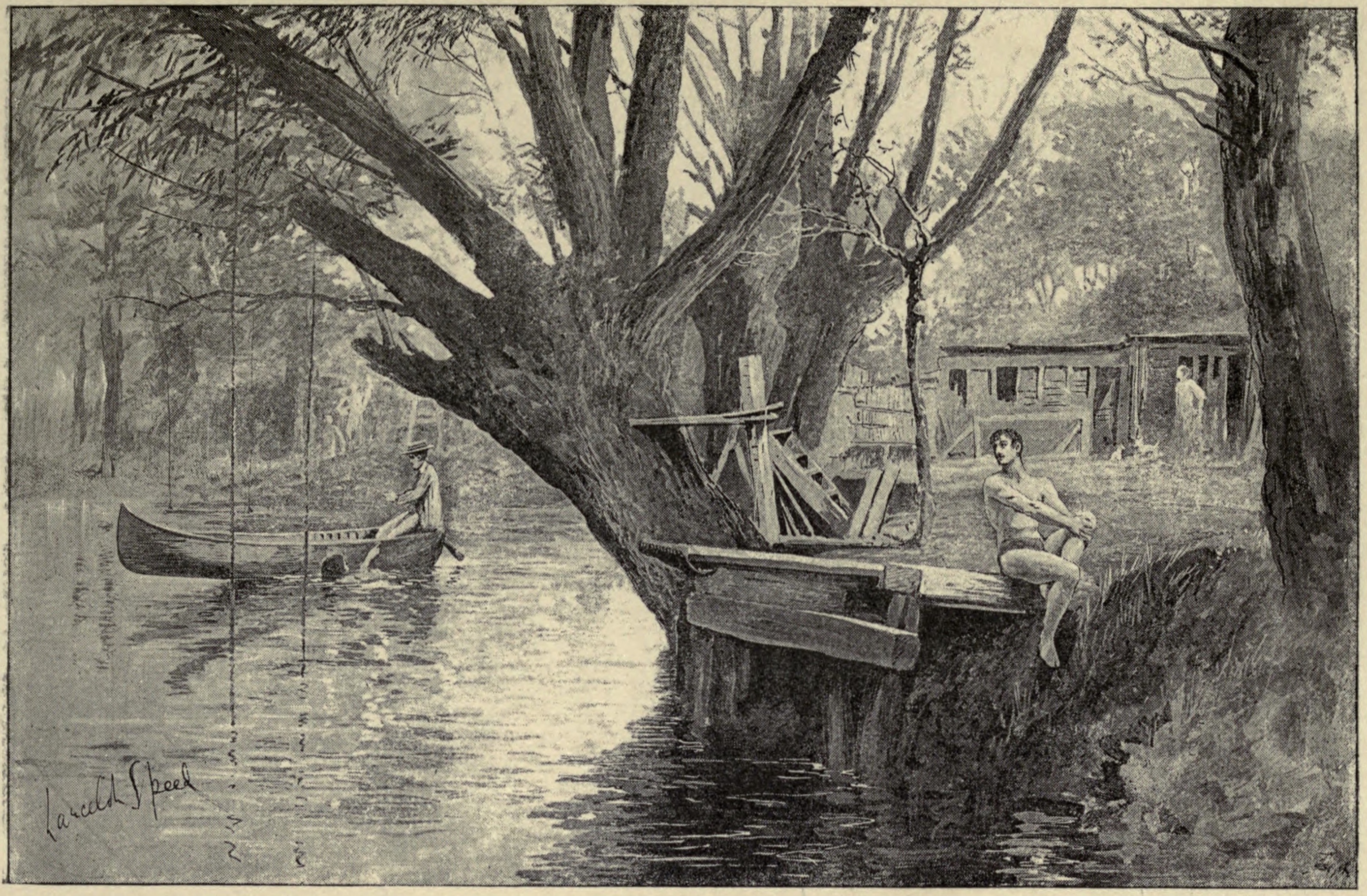
Parson's Pleasure in the late nineteenth century, drawn by Lancelot Speed, from Aspects of Modern Oxford, by a Mere Don [A. D. Godley] (New York: Macmillan & Co, 1894)

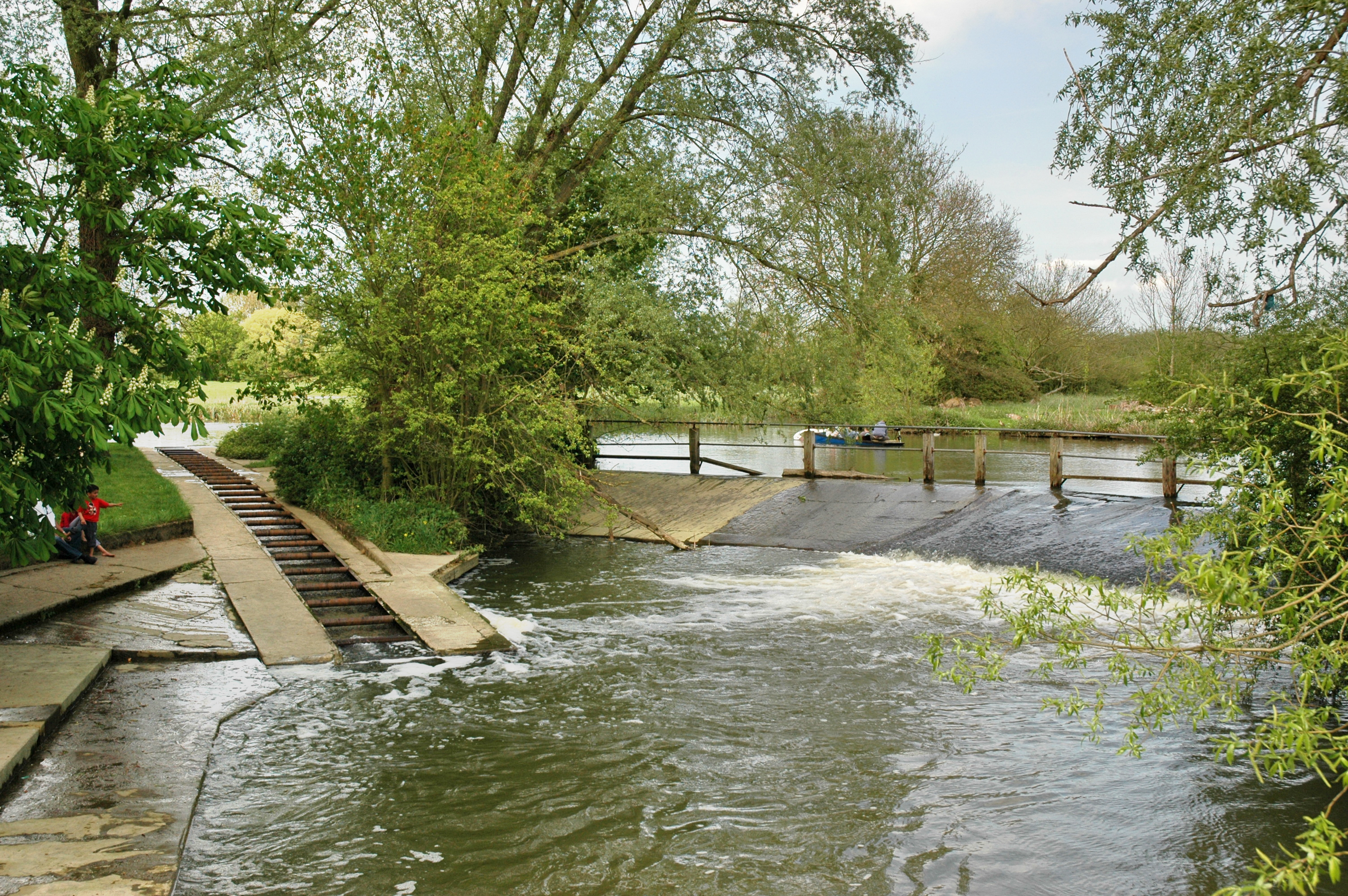
The weir and punt rollers at Parson's Pleasure

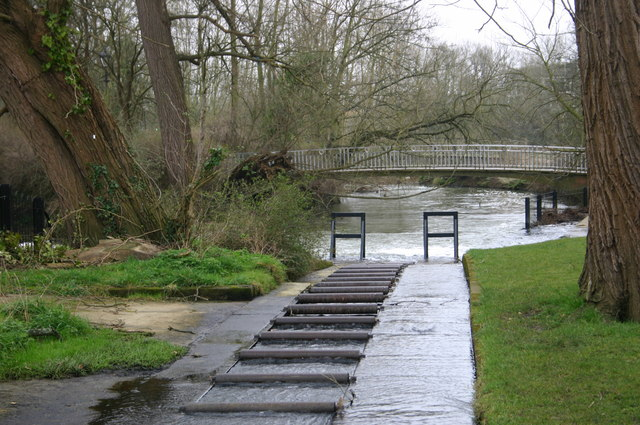
The rollers looking the other way

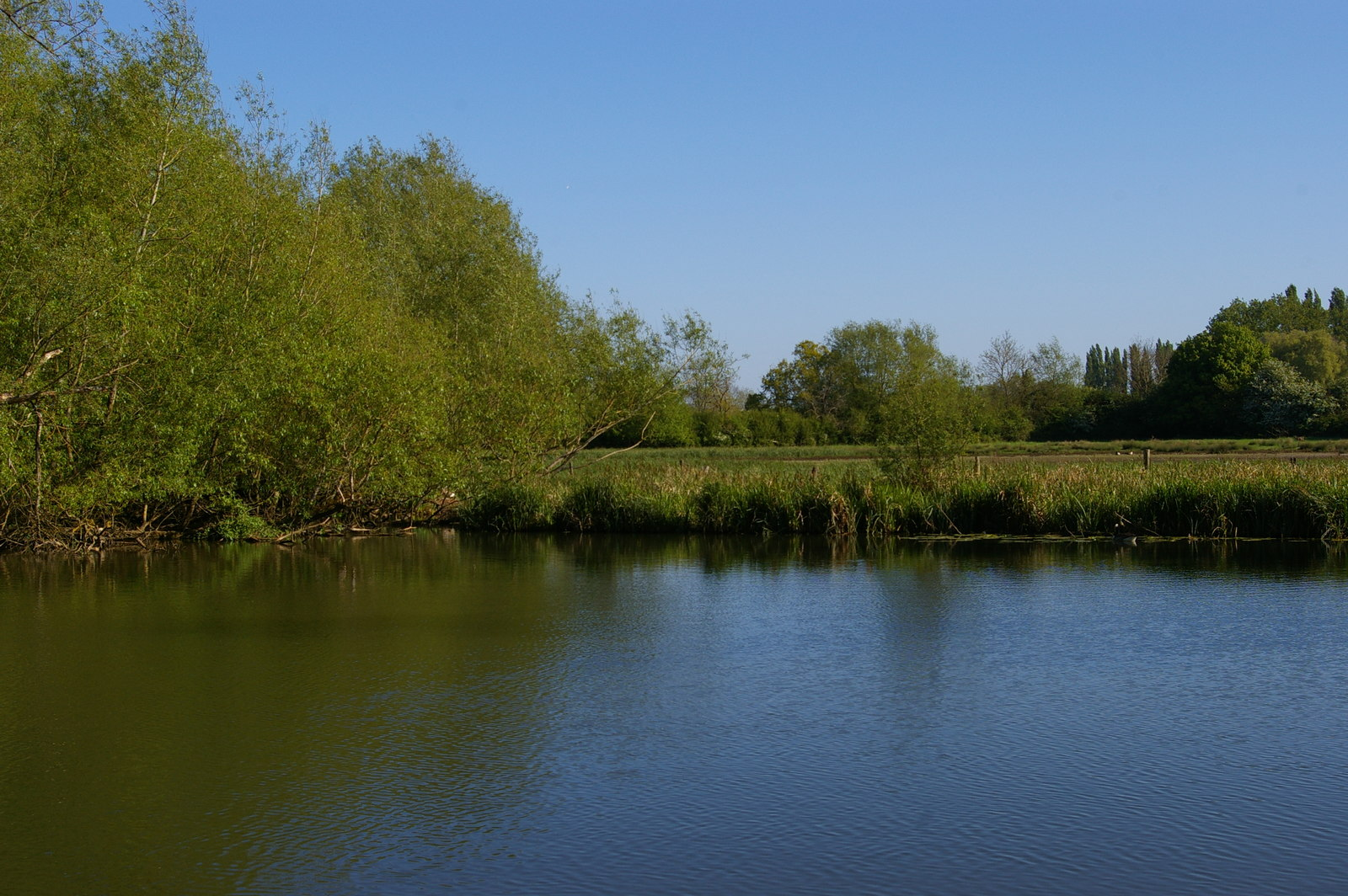
The Cherwell above the weir

Parson's Pleasure in the University Parks at Oxford, England, was a secluded area for male-only nude bathing on the River Cherwell. It was located next to the path on the way to Mesopotamia at the southeast corner of the Parks. The facility closed in 1991 and the area now forms part of the Parks.

== History and folklore ==
It is not clear when the location first came to be called Parson's Pleasure, but in February 1832 a discussion in a local newspaper about new parish boundaries described the new line as running "to the division of the Cherwell at Parson's Pleasure," making it clear that the name would have been known to the general public at that time.

On Wednesday 24 July 1844 three friends, two of them visitors to Oxford, went to Parson's Pleasure to swim. The first to enter the water got into some difficulty and his friend jumped in to save him, but the rescuer was overcome by the struggles of his friend and they both went under. A bootmaker called Samuel Hounslow, a champion swimmer of Oxford, was in the vicinity and dived in and rescued both men. Some of the regular users of Parson's Pleasure collected funds and purchased a side of bacon for Hounslow, a married man with five children, who had rescued two other swimmers in that vicinity within the previous five months.

As well as being a champion swimmer Hounslow was also a swimming teacher and consequently spent a considerable amount of time at Parson's Pleasure and over the next several years he rescued a number of people from drowning. In July 1847 a Mr Doughty from Islington got into difficulties at Parson's Pleasure, the water there reported as being seventeen feet (5.2 metres) deep; Samuel Hounslow dived in and brought him to shore unconscious but alive. In July 1848 Hounslow saved an undergraduate of Christ Church College and it was reported that he had by that time saved the lives of ten different people at Parson's Pleasure. At the end of June 1851 he saved two more people on consecutive days. That year he was awarded the Royal Humane Society Bronze Medal for these rescues.

In June 1859, at the inquest into death by drowning of James Simpson, a student at Exeter College, Mr G V Cox, the University coroner, said that during the previous fifty years there had been 46 inquests held in the University, of which 30 were accidents from boats. The University was urged to adopt some stringent rules to prevent young men who could not swim going in boats. It was reported that at Eton College there had not been a single fatal boating accident since the school introduced a system that made it compulsory for boys to have passed a swimming certificate before being allowed out in boats. Samuel Hounslow's swimming classes at Parson Pleasure, price £1, were particularly recommended.

By July 1859 when Hounslow emigrated to Australia he was reported to have saved the lives of no less than sixteen people at that one place. Regular users of Parson's Pleasure got up a public subscription for him and it was reported that a "respectable sum" had been subscribed.

In December 1854 the Exeter College steeplechase started and finished on the banks of the Cherwell directly opposite Parson's Pleasure. The winner was William Douglas from Limerick in Ireland.

Parson's Pleasure was traditionally frequented by dons of the University. Ladies sitting in passing punts were saved from potential embarrassment by being directed to a path that skirted the area behind a high corrugated iron fence. If a pretext was needed, the ladies could be told that the men needed to haul the punt over "the rollers"—a track made of concrete with metal rollers—next to the nearby weir. Women's use of the path declined in later years but the path and the rollers remain.

The title poem of Christopher Morley's 1923 collection Parsons' [sic] Pleasure describes the area as

A greengloom sideloop of the creek,

A sodden place of twilight smell:
Clear dayshine did not often touch
That water; and a mouldy hutch
For the convenience of undressing.
An ancient, far from prepossessing,
Offered uncandid towels (eschewed
By most).
There men’s white bodies, nude,
Unconscious, comely, gallant, Greek,
Stretched, tingled cool, shone sleek, lived well

In the one patch where sunwarm fell.

In response to this, Morley's friend C. E. Montague wrote that 'considered physically as a bathing place and not as a temple Parson's Pleasure was mediocre. Slugs in the dressing hutches, no life in the water, no sun to stand in when drying, the chill of a morgue over the whole place on all but the most fervent dog days. And yet a grave part of death's menace is that under the mould we may forget Parson's Pleasure.'

Parson's Pleasure is now only a scene for tales from the folklore of the university. One anecdote has it that a number of dons were sunbathing naked at Parson's Pleasure when a female student floated by in a punt. All but one of the startled dons covered their genitals; Maurice Bowra placed a flannel over his head instead. When asked why he had done so, he replied, "I don’t know about you, gentlemen, but in Oxford, I, at least, am known by my face."

Robert Robinson's Landscape with Dead Dons contains a scene set in Parson's Pleasure. Edmund Crispin's first Gervase Fen novel, 'The Moving Toyshop,' puts the climax of a riotous chase at the entrance to Parson's Pleasure.

Anthony Gibbs's autobiography In My Time (UK, c. 1969) / In My Own Good Time (US, 1970) describes the author's regular visits to Parson's Pleasure, "the most enchanting spot in Oxford", during his time as an undergraduate. He writes that it was usual for one punt per afternoon to pass, in which two girls "scarlet-faced and staring straight before them, would meander by. They did it on purpose, of course. No one paid them the slightest attention. Absolute disdain was the code of behavior."

In 1996, the Oxford University Beer Appreciation Society commissioned a local brewery to produce a barley wine called "Parson's Pleasure Ale". There also exists a bell-ringing method named Parson's Pleasure Surprise Maximus, which was rung for the first time in September 2010 by a band of ringers composed of former members of the University of Oxford.

A similar area existed nearby for clothed female bathers, named Dame's Delight. This was closed prior to the closure of Parson's Pleasure.

In the summer of 2026, the bathing spot was covered with a bloom of duckweed, which limited bathing.

== See also ==
- Tumbling Bay outdoor bathing area
