= Tower of the Winds (disambiguation) =

Tower of the Winds is an octagonal marble clocktower in the Roman Agora in Athens.

Tower of the Winds may also refer to:

- Tower of the Winds (Oxford), an octagonal tower on top of the old Radcliffe Observatory building in Oxford, England
- Tower of the Winds (Vatican), a round tower located above the Gallery of Maps, which connects the Villa Belvedere with the Apostolic Palace in Vatican City
