= PKS 1424−418 =

Blazar in the constellation Centaurus

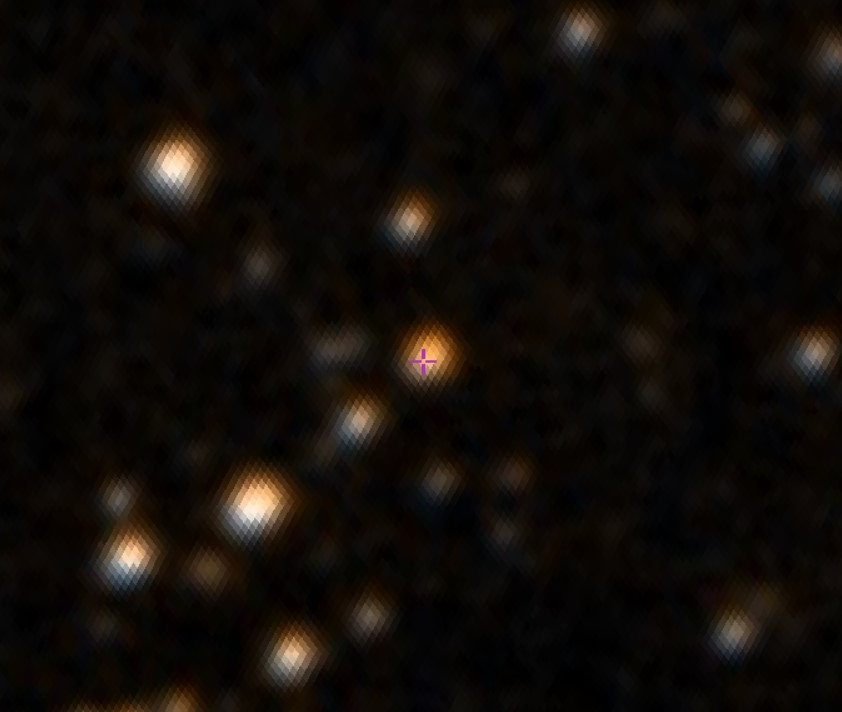
- The blazar PKS 1424−418

Observation data (J2000.0 epoch)
- Constellation: Centaurus
- Right ascension: 14^{h} 27^{m} 56.297^{s}
- Declination: −42° 06′ 19.438″
- Redshift: 1.522000
- Heliocentric radial velocity: 456,824 km/s
- Distance: 9.439 Gly
- Apparent magnitude (V): 17.7
- Apparent magnitude (B): 18.48

Characteristics
- Type: Blazar; HPQ, FRSQ

Other designations
- LEDA 2827996, PMN J1427−4206, 4FGL J1427.9−4206, WMAP 191, G4Jy 1168

PKS 1424−418 is a blazar located in the constellation of Centaurus. It has a redshift of 1.522 and was first discovered in 1971 by astronomer Keith Peter Tritton who identified the object as ultraviolet-excessive. This object is also highly polarized with a compact radio source. The radio spectrum of this source appears flat, making it a flat-spectrum radio quasar.

PKS 1424−418 is found optically variable on the electromagnetic spectrum. It is a strong source of gamma rays. Between 2008 and 2011, PKS 1424−418 showed four phases of bright flares at GeV energies. The flares have a high correlation between the energy ranges with the exception of one flare that occurred at the same time it showed low gamma activity. In April 2013, it underwent a major gamma ray outburst with its peak flux reaching values of F(> 100 MeV) > 3 × 10^{−6} ph cm^{−2} s^{−1}. According to Large Area Telescope observations, this emission originated beyond its broad-line region. A near-infrared flare was witnessed in PKS 1424−418 in January 2018. In August 2022, it once again displayed an episode of rapid flaring activity in both gamma ray and optical bands.

PKS 1424−418 contains a radio structure, comprising a strong radio core and a weaker component with a position angle of 260°. Further observations also showed the core has a size of 0.4 mas with extended emission at both the core's position and northwest. In addition, the core has a flat spectral index of -0.04. A jet is seen extending west from the core before becoming diffused.

Between May 2009 and September 2019, the gamma ray emission from PKS 1424−418 was found to undergo a quasi-periodic oscillation with a 353-day flux oscillation period. A 355-day period with high significance level is also confirmed by adopting time domain methods. This might be explained by orbital motion of a binary supermassive black hole system with the mass of a primary black hole being M ~ 3.5 × 10^{8} - 5.5 × 10^{9} M_{☉}.
