= PKS 2052−474 =

Blazar in the constellation of Indus

Observation data (J2000.0 epoch)
- Constellation: Indus
- Right ascension: 20^{h} 56^{m} 16.35^{s}
- Declination: −47° 14′ 47.62″
- Redshift: 1.491500
- Heliocentric radial velocity: 447,140 km/s
- Distance: 9.335 Gly
- Apparent magnitude (V): 19.1
- Apparent magnitude (B): 18.29

Characteristics
- Type: FSRQ; LPQ blazar

Other designations
- PKS 2052−47, 2MASS J20561636−4714475, PMN J2056−4714, SUMSS J205616−471448, LEDA 2830665, Cul 2052−474, WMAP 208, G4Jy 1665, RX J2056.2−4714

PKS 2052−474 is a blazar located in the southern constellation of Indus. The redshift of the object is (z) 1.491 and was discovered as a radio source during observations conducted at Parkes Observatory located in New South Wales, in September 1964. It was later identified as a galaxy by Keith Tritton, with its radio spectrum described as flat, thus making it a flat-spectrum radio quasar.

== Description ==
PKS 2052−474 is very variable on the electromagnetic spectrum. It is noted for its increasing gamma-ray activity as indicated on 9 August 2009, where it reach a high state with a gamma-ray flux measurement of 8.7 ± 1.6 × 10^{−7} photons cm^{−2} s^{−1}, detected by Fermi Gamma-ray space Telescope, which was more than a factor of 4. It also underwent two minor flares between June and July 2009, with its flux increasing upwards to 15.6 magnitude in R-bands by 21 July, followed by an outburst in August. On 2 March 2020, it was found in an elevated gamma-ray emission state with its flux measured as 1.2 ± −0.2 × 10^{−6} photons cm^{−2} s^{−1} making this the highest daily flux detected in this source. Data from a light curve, have showed PKS 2052−474 has two flaring periods, occurring in February and June 2009, but absence of significant emission line variability.

The source of PKS 2052−474 is compact. Very Long Baseline Interferometry imaging at 8.4 GHz, have shown the object has a prominent radio core measuring 0.38 Jansky and a jet component located at a distance of 0.7 milliarcseconds with a position angle of -66°. At 4.8 GHz, imaging showed the source has the same core with the weakest feature interpreted as a secondary component appearing 8 milliarcseconds to the east, likely interpreted as an imaging artifact. A two-sided jet is seen emerging from the core region on arcsecond scales while first-epoch imaging results showed there is a weak jet towards west direction.

PKS 2052−474 has been used as a Molonglo calibrator. When observed by the Molonglo Observatory Synthesis Telescope, the source is found to have a steep radio spectrum at a low frequency. However, it then flattens when reaching high frequencies prompting astronomers to classify it as variable on a time scale amongst 17 other sources. This is suggested by scintillation in interstellar medium rather caused by intrinsic effects on the source. A lower limit has also been calculated for the object with a brightness temperature of 2 × 10^{11} K, based on an upper limit of the source's angular size. There is evidence PKS 2052−474 has quasi-periodic periodicity of 637 days, making it a candidate quasar with a binary supermassive black hole. An accretion disk temperature of 1.23 (± 0.33) × 10^{4} K and disk luminosity of 1.29 (± 1.68) × 10^{46} erg s^{−1} has been calculated for PKS 2052−474.
