= 3C 351 =

Quasar in the constellation of Draco

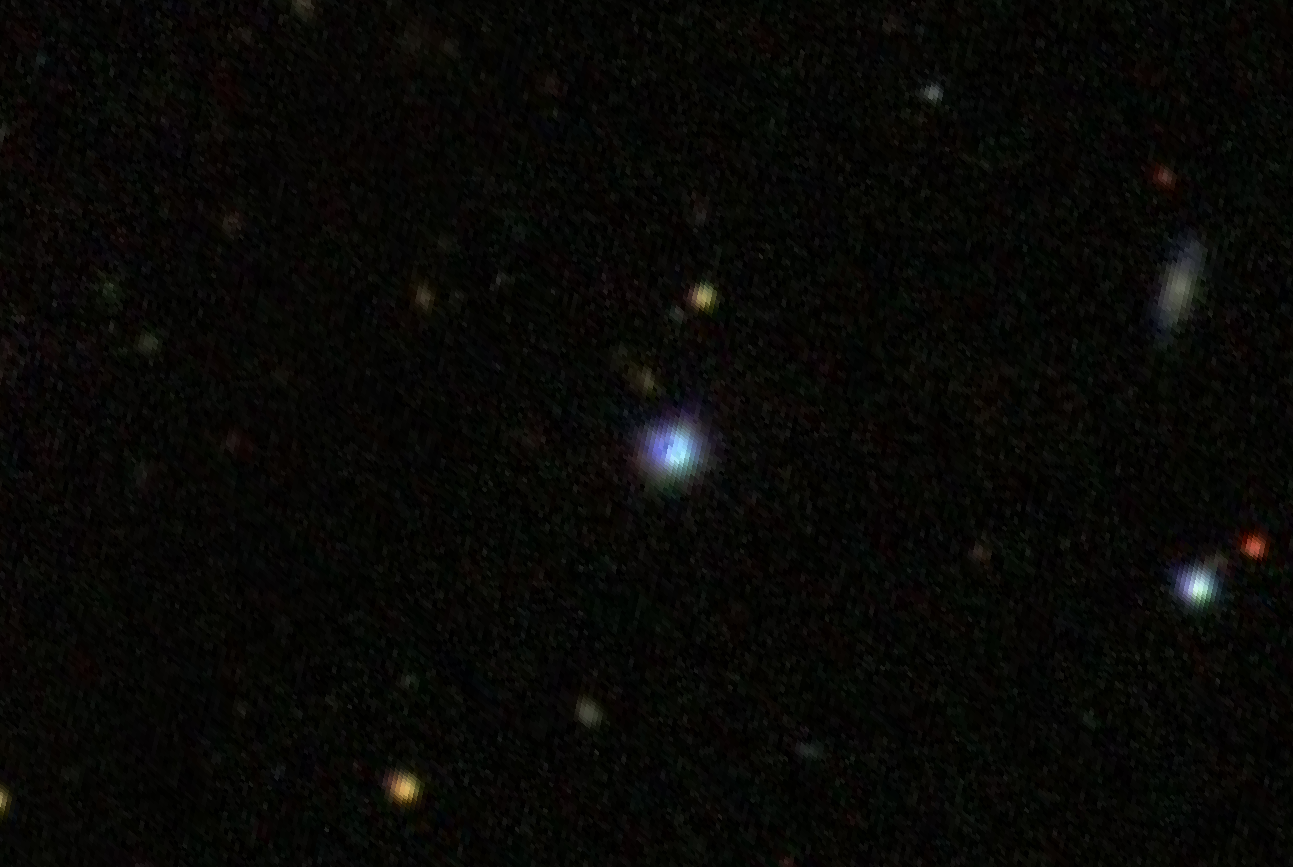
- SDSS image of 3C 351.

Observation data (J2000.0 epoch)
- Constellation: Draco
- Right ascension: 17^{h} 04^{m} 41.37^{s}
- Declination: +60° 44′ 30.60″
- Redshift: 0.371523
- Heliocentric radial velocity: 111,380 km/s
- Distance: 4.179 Gly
- Apparent magnitude (V): 15.40
- Apparent magnitude (B): 15.65

Characteristics
- Type: Opt var;RLQ Sy1.5
- Size: ~1,535,000 ly (470.6 kpc) (estimated)

Other designations
- SBS 1704+608, LEDA 2817694, PG 1704+608, 4C +60.24, 2MASS J17044138+6044305, SDSS J170441.37+604430.4, HS 1704+6048, 6C B170404.4+604844, 7C 1704+6048, OT +607, DA 430, NRAO 0522, CoNFIG 266, E 1704+608, 2E 3828, RX J1704.6+6044

3C 351 is a radio-loud quasar located in the constellation of Draco. Its redshift is (z) 0.371, and it was first recorded in the Third Cambridge Catalogue of Radio Sources survey in 1962. The object is noted to be variable according to optical monitoring in 1971 by Keith Tritton and classified as X-ray quiet.

== Description ==
3C 351 is classified as a Fanaroff-Riley Class Type II quasar. Its host galaxy is an E3 elliptical galaxy with an undisturbed flat appearance and a position angle of 60°, based on Hubble Space Telescope imaging. A close companion galaxy is located 28 kiloparsecs from the host, however there are no signs of interaction. The radio spectrum of the quasar has been categorized as steep and the host displays a low-surface brightness extension in a northerly direction. The supermassive black hole lying inside the center of the quasar is estimated to be 9.39^{+0.08}_{-0.10} M_{☉}, based on a single optical spectroscopy measurement.

The source of 3C 351 imaged with Very Large Array (VLA), has a prominent double lobed dominated structure. Observations show a diffused radio emission bridge, a radio core and a jet that is described as having a stubby appearance, with an extension 2 arcseconds long. Deeper VLA imaging shows it is curving towards the hotspot direction. New VLA observations made in 2007 found the source's lobes are mainly asymmetrical and of unequal brightness. The lobe on the northeast side is split into several components; mainly bright features and a recessed hotspot located at the jet's end. The lobe on the southeast side, is edge-darkened and diffused, without the presence of a hotspot. Both lobes expand outwards, completely enveloping the core. Diffused radio emission is detected in addition.

Older VLA imaging in 1980 showed the hotspots have different structures and an outer component that is curved, confirming the fact it is interacting with the surrounding interstellar medium. One clear resolved compact feature has been found by Very Long Baseline Interferometry (VLBI). There is polarization present in the quasar. Based on studies, the polarization degree is shown as rapidly rising up to between 20% and 25% away from the emission region north and west from the hotspot. On the western edge of the fan boundary, the greatest degree of polarization can be found right up to 50% and 65%. Polarization can also be found inside parts of its jet.

Despite not belonging to a family of optically violent variable quasars (OVVs), 3C 351 exhibits variability fluctuations on long-term scales between 15.7 and 16.2, with amplitude variations lasting for 477 days in total. A low observed state was observed in 1985. The Hamburg Quasar Monitoring (HQM) program conducted in June 1994 found the quasar is possibly weakly variable. A rich system of narrow and broad absorption lines of various rich chemical elements has been found in the quasar's spectrum.
