= 157P/Tritton =

Periodic comet with 6-year orbit

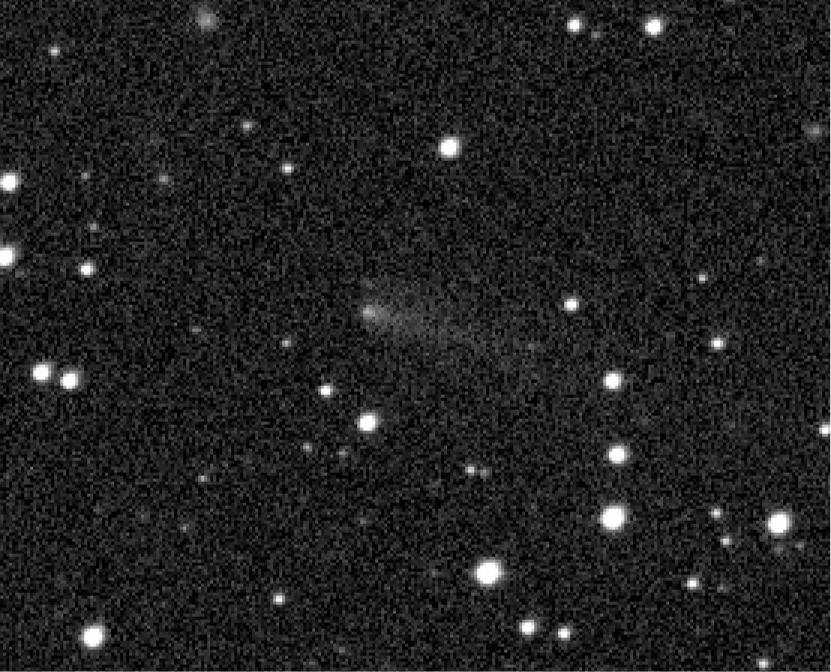
- Comet 157P/Tritton on 5 September 2022 by ZTF with fragment B visible

Discovery
- Discovered by: Keith Tritton
- Discovery date: February 11, 1978

Designations
- Alternative designations: 1977 XIII

Orbital characteristics
- Epoch: 2023-02-25
- Aphelion: 5.519 AU
- Perihelion: 1.572 AU
- Semi-major axis: 3.545 AU
- Eccentricity: 0.5566
- Orbital period: 6.675 a
- Inclination: 12.42°
- Last perihelion: 2022-Sep-09; June 10, 2016; February 20, 2010
- Next perihelion: 2028-Mar-07 (B); 2029-May-18

157P/Tritton is a periodic comet with a 6-year orbital period. Fragment B was first observed on 21 August 2022.

== Observational history ==
Keith Tritton (U. K. Schmidt Telescope Unit, Coonabarabran) discovered this comet on a deep IIIa-J exposure made with the 122-cm Schmidt telescope on 1978 February 11.66.

The comet was not detected during the predicted returns of 1984, 1990 or 1996 and was presumed lost. However, on 2003 October 6.44, using CCD images obtained with a 0.12-m refractor, C. W. Juels (Fountain Hills, Arizona, USA) and P. Holvorcem (Campinas, Brazil) detected a comet that proved to be on a similar orbit to the lost comet. B. G. Marsden was able to calculate a new orbit, published in IAU Circular No. 8215, issued 2003 October 7, which confirmed that it was indeed identical to comet Tritton.

The comet was also recovered at its 2010, 2016, and 2022 apparitions. On 2 October 2022 the discovery of a new fragment of the comet was published in MPEC 2022-T23. With a smaller orbit, fragment B should come to perihelion in 2028 March and the primary fragment should come to perihelion in 2029 May (1y 2m 11d later).

Orbital Elements for Epoch 2023-Feb-25
Component	Period (years)	Perihelion	Aphelion (AU)	Semi-major axis (AU)	Eccentricity	Inclination	Next Perihelion
157P	6.68	1.572	5.519	3.545	0.5566	12.42°	2029-May-18
157P-B	5.49	1.552	4.671	3.111	0.5012	12.43°	2028-Mar-07

Numbered comets
Previous; 156P/Russell–LINEAR	157P/Tritton	Next; 158P/Kowal–LINEAR
