= Tower of the Winds (Oxford) =

Tower in Oxford, England

Coordinates: 51°45′35″N 1°15′59″W

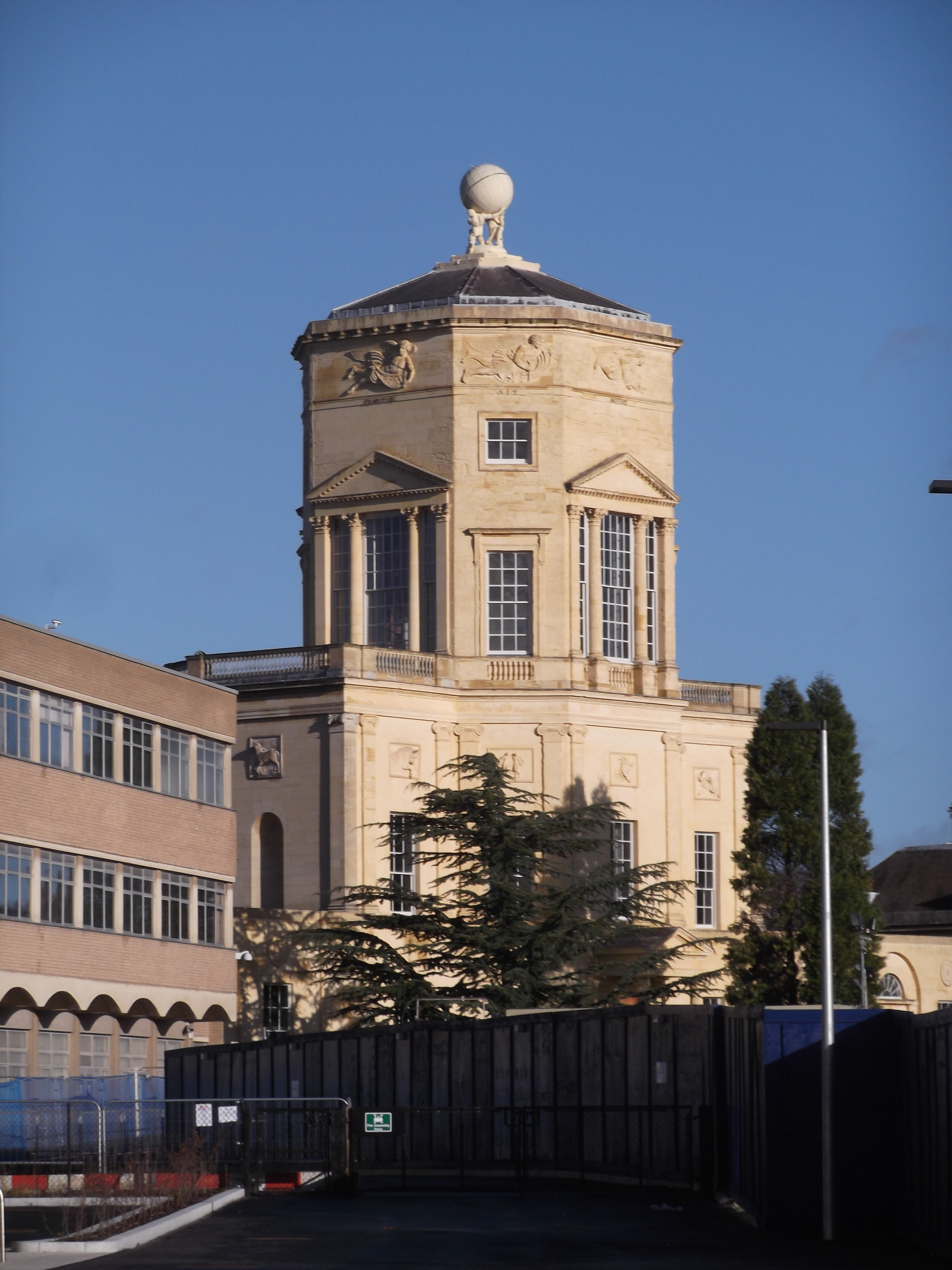
View of the Tower of the Winds in Oxford

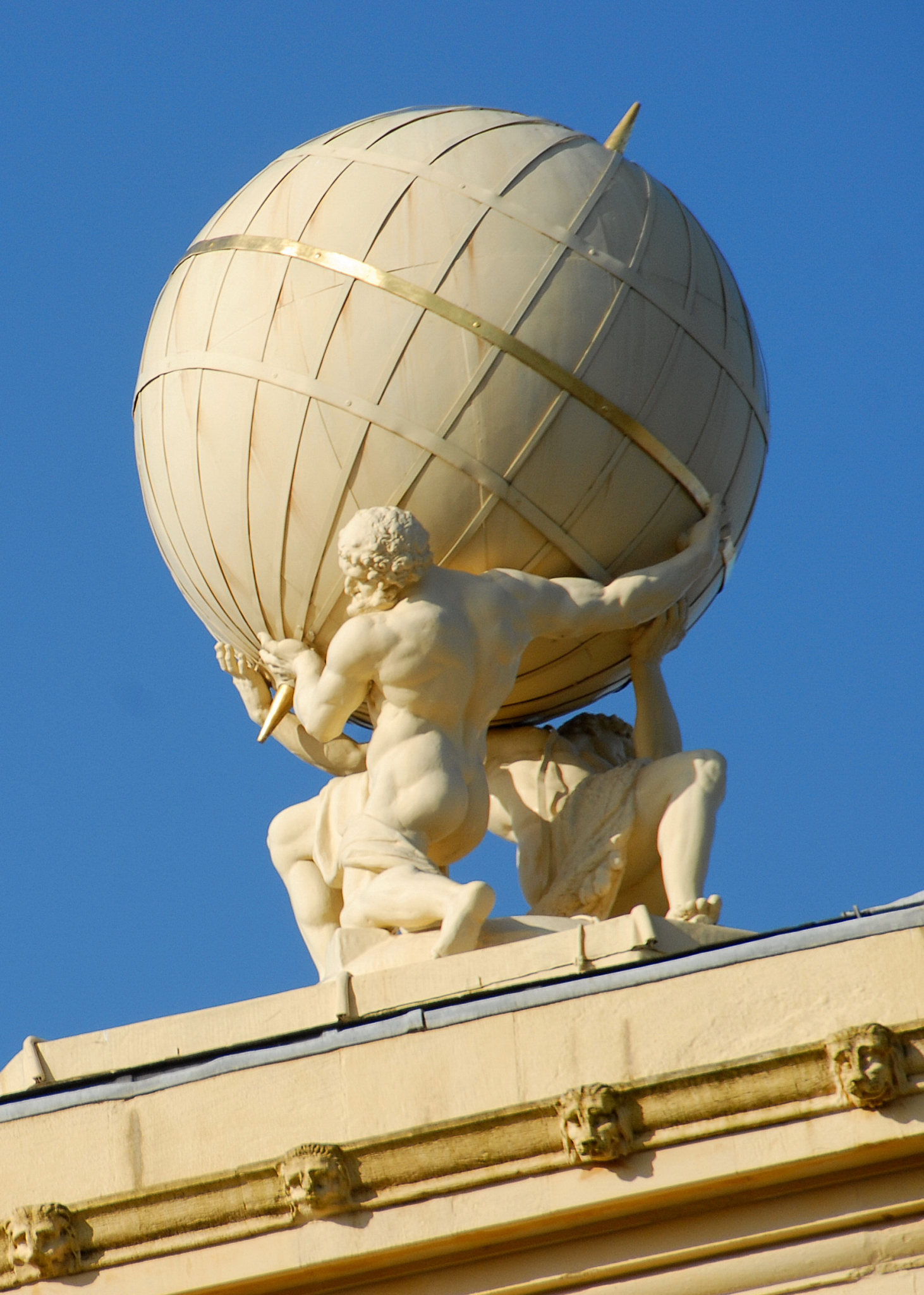
Statue of Atlas and Hercules supporting a globe on top of the tower

The Tower of the Winds is the prominent octagonal tower on top of the old Radcliffe Observatory building in Oxford, England. The building now forms a centrepiece for Green Templeton College, one of the colleges of Oxford University.

The tower is based on the ancient (but much smaller) Tower of the Winds in Athens, Greece, built c.100–50 BC by Andronicus of Cyrrhus for the purpose of measuring time. It is of octagonal stone construction, with eight relief images of Greek mythological wind gods at the top of each side of the tower, carved by John Bacon the Elder in 1792–4, copying those in Athens. The tower was completed by James Wyatt in 1794. On the top are Atlas and Hercules supporting a globe in white, also by John Bacon. The reliefs of the signs of the zodiac above the windows on the first floor are made of Coade stone by J. C. F. Rossi. Inside the tower, there are three main rooms on top of each other.

The Tower of the Winds is situated in prominent view of the adjacent telescope dome of the Radcliffe Observatory, which has lent its name not only to Observatory Street to the north, but also the surrounding Radcliffe Observatory Quarter (ROQ) which has supplanted the previous Radcliffe Infirmary complex with a constellation of prominent new buildings of the University of Oxford. The closest of these are the Andrew Wiles Mathematical Institute and the striking new Stephen A. Schwarzman Centre for the Humanities, thereby creating an arrangement which juxtaposes noted examples of 21st-century academic architecture with the 18th-century observatory and Tower. Other modern buildings in the ROQ include the NHS's Jericho Health Centre and the Blavatnik School of Government. The ROQ is bounded on the south by Somerville College and on the north by Green Templeton College, while the Woodstock Road and Walton Street respectively represent its eastern and western boundaries. Just across the Woodstock Road is located St Anne's College, which therefore also enjoys fine views of the Tower.

== See also ==
- Classical compass winds
- List of wind deities
- Observatory Street, Oxford
- Radcliffe Observatory
- Radcliffe Observatory Quarter
- Tower of the Winds, Athens, Greece
