= Lion mask =

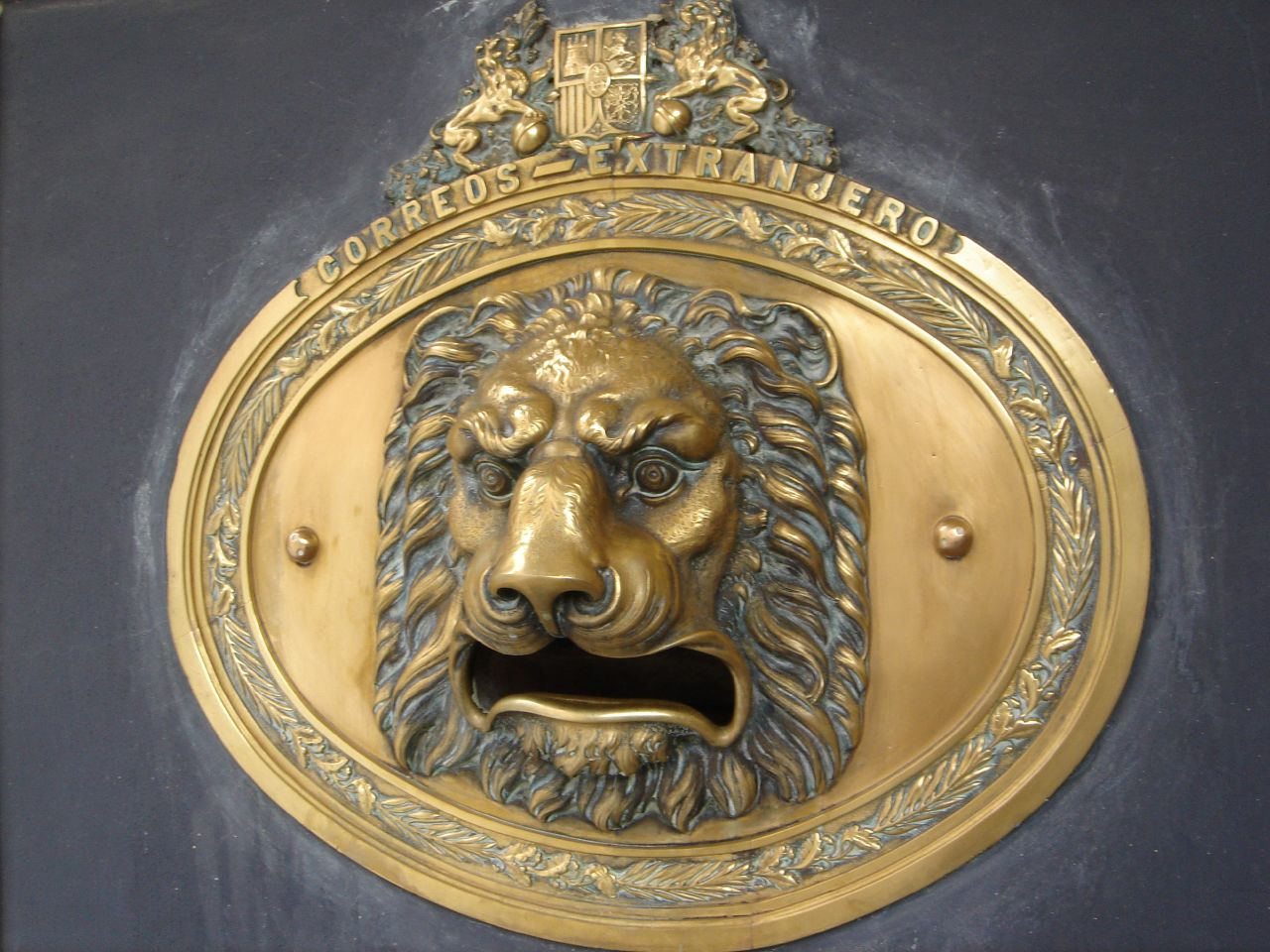
Lion's head mail slot at the Palace of Letters in Valladolid, Spain.

The lion mask is a motif used from antiquity as an emblem of strength, courage, and majesty. Lion masks (also referred to as "lion heads") are frequently employed as water spouts on the modillions, or consoles, of the Corinthian Order. The Tower of the Winds in Athens (c. 50 BC) has stone relief lion masks below the roof, functioning as water spouts.

The lion mask holding a ring in its mouth for a handle derives from furniture from ancient Rome and it continues to be popular as doorknocker. Both Venetian and façon de Venise goblets feature decorative prunts moulded in the lion mask shapes frequently alluding to the symbol of Venice, the Lion of Saint Mark, although the lion's head goblet sometimes has other associations. (Note: For example, a symbol of the governorship of Bohemia in the Habsburg court.)

From the early to mid-18th century, the lion mask enjoyed popularity as a favoured motif for furniture ornament, used as an arm rest support or to decorate a cabriole leg. Occasionally, a lion's paw or pelt appears alongside the mask.

== See also ==
- Lions in art

== Bibliography ==
- Frank C. Brown, Study of the Orders, American School of Correspondence, London (1906).
- Chandler R. Clifford, Period Furnishings: an Encyclopedia of Historic Furniture, Decorations and Furnishings, Clifford & Lawton, New York (1911).
- George B. Frazee, Jr., "Here's Information about Chairs that will Aid You in Selling", in The Grand Rapids Furniture Record, Periodical Publishing Company, Grand Rapids, vol. XLVII, No. 1 (July 1923).
- Oscar White Muscarella, Bronze and Iron: Ancient Near Eastern Artifacts in the Metropolitan Museum of Art, Metropolitan Museum of Art, New York (1988), ISBN 978-0-87099-525-5.
- Jutta-Annette Page, Beyond Venice: Glass in Venetian Style, 1500–1750, Corning Museum of Glass, Hudson Hills Press, New York (2004).
- Daniel Savoy, The Globalization of Renaissance Art: A Critical Review, Brill (2017), ISBN 978-90-04-35579-8.
- Clare Vernon, From Byzantine to Norman Italy, Bloomsbury, London (2023).
