= 156P/Russell–LINEAR =

Periodic comet

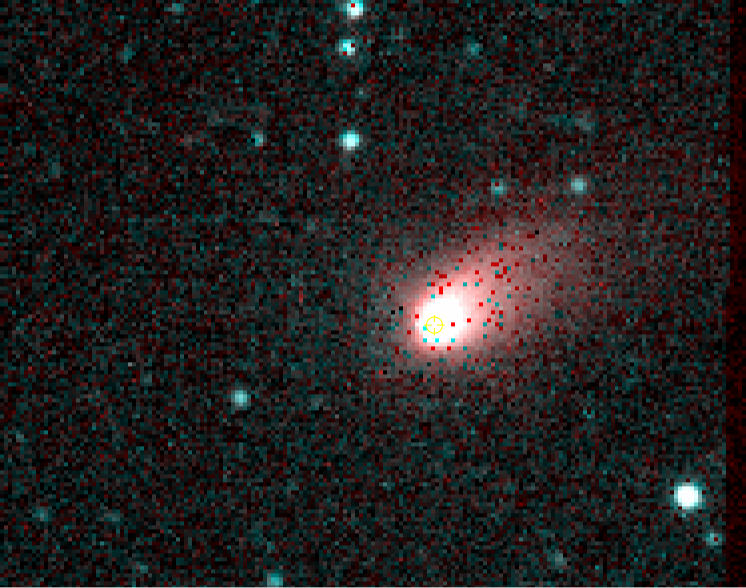
- Comet Russell–LINEAR on 9 December 2020 by NEOWISE

Discovery
- Discovered by: Kenneth S. Russell
- Discovery site: Siding Spring Observatory
- Discovery date: 3 September 1986

Designations
- MPC designation: P/1986 R1, P/1993 WU, P/2000 QD_{181}, P/2000 XV_{43}

Orbital characteristics
- Epoch: 20 March 2020 (JD 2458928.5)
- Observation arc: 35.57 years
- Number of observations: 2,317
- Aphelion: 5.591 AU
- Perihelion: 1.333 AU
- Semi-major axis: 3.462 AU
- Eccentricity: 0.61492
- Orbital period: 6.442 years
- Inclination: 17.264°
- Longitude of ascending node: 35.397°
- Argument of periapsis: 0.378°
- Mean anomaly: 322.84°
- Last perihelion: 18 November 2020
- Next perihelion: 30 April 2027
- T_{Jupiter}: 2.732
- Earth MOID: 0.339 AU
- Jupiter MOID: 0.100 AU

Physical characteristics
- Mean radius: 2.0 ± 0.2 km (1.24 ± 0.12 mi)
- Comet total magnitude (M1): 12.7

156P/Russell–LINEAR is a Jupiter-family comet with an orbital period of 6.4 years. It was discovered by Kenneth S. Russell in September 1986.

== Observational history ==
The comet was found by Australian astronomer Kenneth S. Russell in September 1986 on a plate exposed on 3 September 1986 using the U.K. Schmidt Telescope of Siding Spring Observatory, Australia. The comet had an apparent magnitude of 17. Follow up observations on 25 September failed to recover the comet. The comet was spotted again in a plate exposed using the 0.46-m Schmidt telescope of Palomar Observatory by Carolyn S. Shoemaker on 19 November 1993. The comet had asteroidal appearance and was given the provisional designation 1993 WU.

The comet was observed again during the 2000 perihelion. The comet was noted as an asteroidal object by Lincoln Near-Earth Asteroid Research on 31 August and 5 November and was given the provisional designation 2000 QD_{181}, and was observed again in November 2000-January 2001 and named 2000 XV_{43}. Timothy B. Spahr noted that these objects were the same as the 1986 comet. It was then given the number 156P.

The comet had passed 0.70 AU from Jupiter in November 1970 and its perihelion distance decreased from 1.73 AU to 1.56 AU. The comet approached again to Jupiter in March 2018 at a distance of 0.36 AU and its perihelion distance decreased to 1.33 AU, while the orbital period decreased from 6.85 years to 6.44 years.

During the 2020 perihelion, the comet approached to 0.48 AU from Earth on 24 October 2020. It brightened to an apparent magnitude of 9.7 in mid November 2020.

== Physical characteristics ==
The cyanide and diatomic carbon production rate was estimated to be (2.85±0.51)×10^{24} mol/s and (3.44±0.62)×10^{24} mol/s respectively on 14 October 2020, when the comet was located at an heliocentrical distance of 1.40 AU. The production rates are comparable to those of other Jupiter-family comets. Two strong jets were observed during perihelion and persisted until December, indicating increased activity after perihelion.

The size of its nucleus is estimated to be less than 2.0 ± 0.2 km (1.24 ± 0.12 mi) in radius.

Numbered comets
| Previous; 155P/Shoemaker | 156P/Russell–LINEAR | Next; 157P/Tritton |
