= 155P/Shoemaker =

Jupiter-family comet

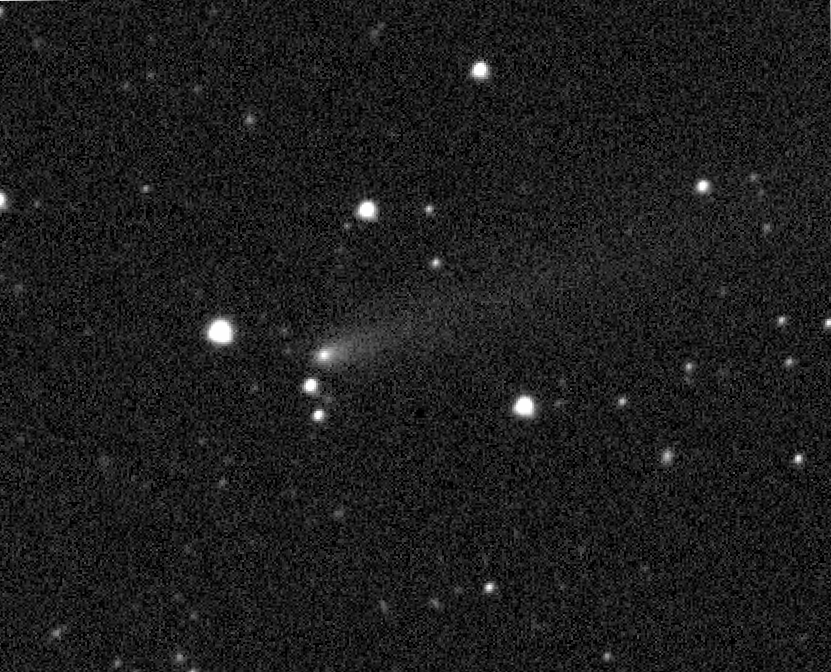
- Comet Shoemaker 3 photographed from the Zwicky Transient Facility on 25 November 2019

Discovery
- Discovered by: Carolyn S. Shoemaker; Eugene M. Shoemaker
- Discovery site: Palomar Observatory
- Discovery date: 10 January 1986

Designations
- MPC designation: P/1986 A1, P/2002 R2
- Alternative designations: Shoemaker 3; 1985 XVIII, 1986a

Orbital characteristics
- Epoch: 21 November 2025 (JD 2461000.5)
- Observation arc: 34.36 years (Note: Observation arc from the Minor Planet Center database covering dates from 10 January 1986 until 22 May 2020.)
- Number of observations: 2,027
- Aphelion: 11.355 AU
- Perihelion: 1.789 AU
- Semi-major axis: 6.572 AU
- Eccentricity: 0.72774
- Orbital period: 16.849 years
- Inclination: 6.411°
- Longitude of ascending node: 97.157°
- Argument of periapsis: 14.541°
- Mean anomaly: 128.40°
- Last perihelion: 15 November 2019
- Next perihelion: 22 September 2036
- T_{Jupiter}: 2.328
- Earth MOID: 0.825 AU
- Jupiter MOID: 0.302 AU

Physical characteristics
- Mean radius: 1.51 km (0.94 mi)
- Comet total magnitude (M1): 10.0
- Apparent magnitude: 14.89 (2019 apparition)

Comet Shoemaker 3, also known as 155P/Shoemaker, is a Jupiter-family comet with a 17-year-long orbit around the Sun. It is one of 32 comets discovered by American astronomers, Carolyn and Eugene Shoemaker.

== Observational history ==
The comet was discovered from the Palomar Observatory on the night of 10 January 1986. The Shoemakers' discovery was confirmed by Brian A. Skiff from the Lowell Observatory two days later. Further observations and astrometric measurements by Brian G. Marsden revealed that the new comet is also periodic.

It was next recovered by Shuichi Nakano on 9 September 2002. A series of possible outbursts occurred from the comet in October 2019, which has raised its maximum brightness to 14.89 during its most recent perihelion.

== Notes ==
Numbered comets
Previous; 154P/Brewington	155P/Shoemaker	Next; 156P/Russell–LINEAR
