= Cyrrhus (Macedonia) =

Town in ancient Macedonia

- Κύρρος (Ancient Greek)
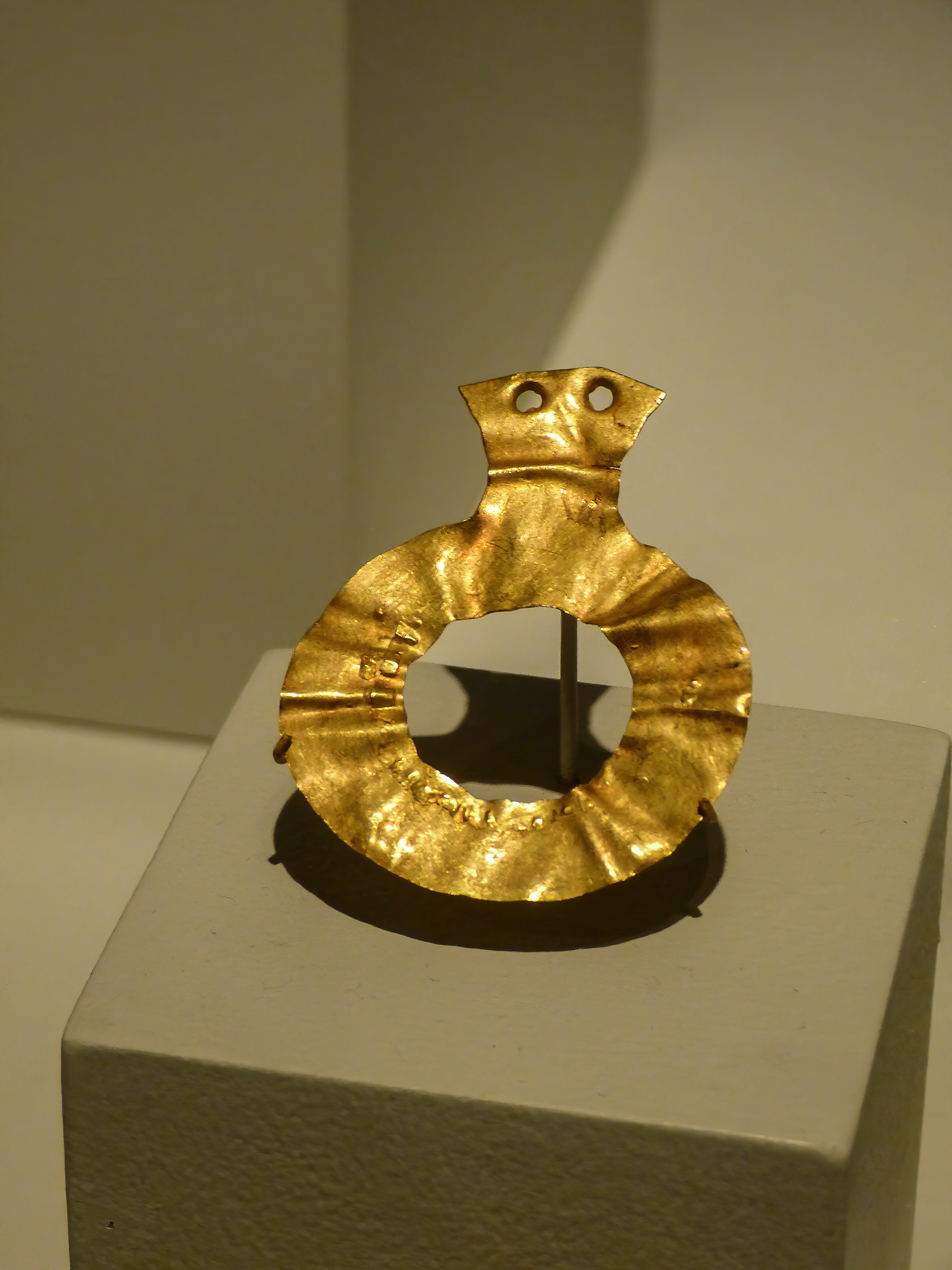
- Prehistoric gold ornament from Cyrrhus.
- Interactive map of Cyrrhus
- 40°50′40″N 22°18′09″E

Cyrrhus or Kyrros (Ancient Greek: Κύρρος), also known as Cyrius or Kyrius (Κύριος), was a town in ancient Macedonia. Sitalces penetrated into Macedonia to the left of Cyrrhus and Pella.

It is located near the modern Aravissos.

The other Cyrrhus, a now-ruined city on the Euphrates, was named after it by Seleucus I Nicator, a Macedonian general with Alexander the Great. It is not known which Andronicus of Cyrrhus came from.
