= Radcliffe Observatory =

Observatory in Oxford, England

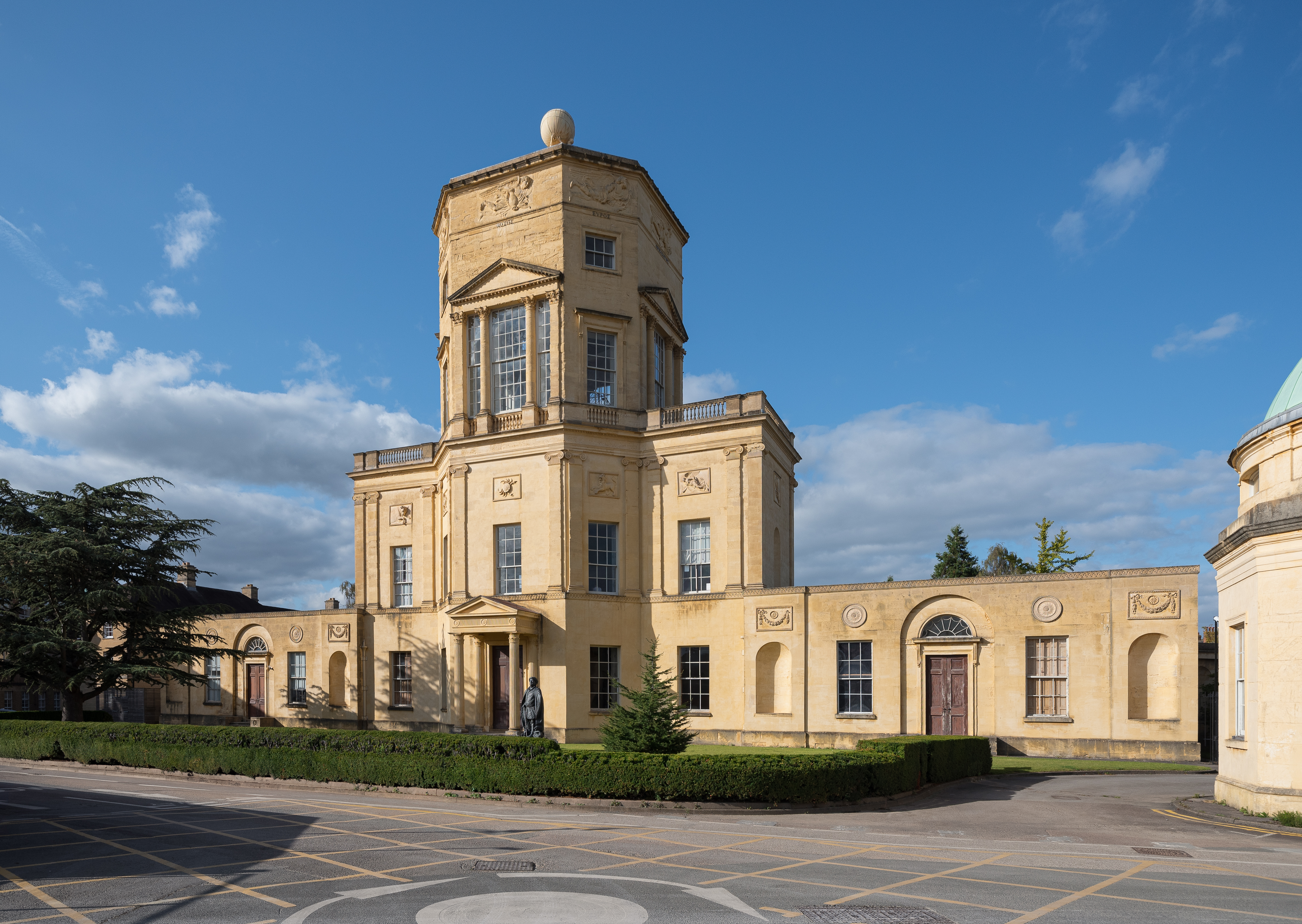
- South front of the observatory

- Location within Oxford city centre

General information
- Type: Former observatory
- Architectural style: Neoclassical
- Location: Woodstock Road, Oxford
- Coordinates: 51.7608°N 1.2639°W
- Construction started: 1772; 254 years ago
- Completed: 1794; 232 years ago
- Owner: Green Templeton College

Design and construction
- Architects: Henry Keene and James Wyatt
- Designations: Listed Grade I

Radcliffe Observatory was the astronomical observatory of the University of Oxford from 1773 until 1934, when the Radcliffe Trustees sold it and built a new observatory in Pretoria, South Africa. It is a Grade I listed building. Today, the building forms part of Green Templeton College of the University of Oxford.

== History ==
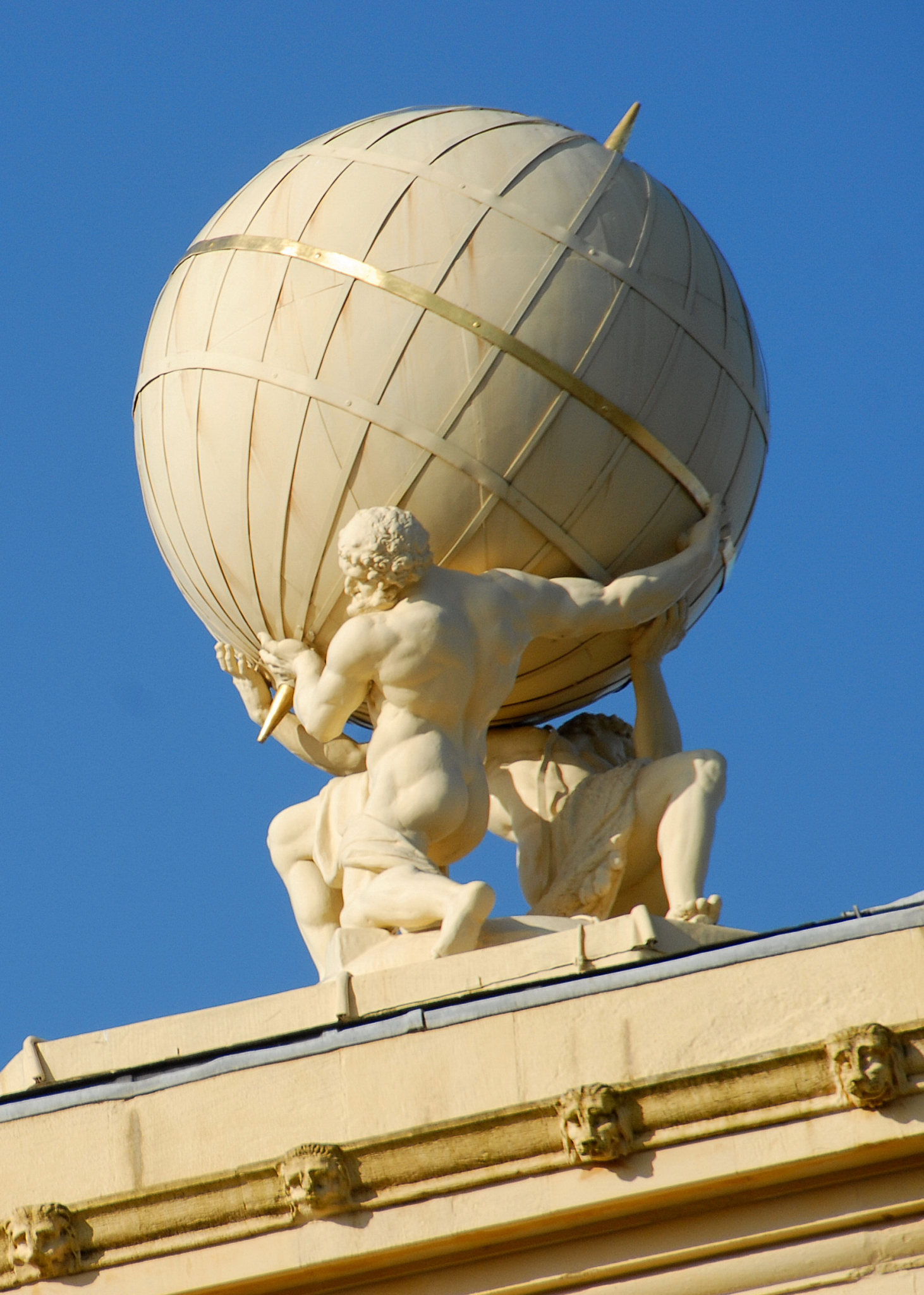
Statue of Atlas on top of the observatory

The observatory was founded and named after the physician John Radcliffe (1650–1714) by the Radcliffe Trustees. It was built on the suggestion of the astronomer Thomas Hornsby, who was occupying the Savilian Chair of Astronomy, following his observation of the notable transit of Venus across the Sun's disc in 1769 from a room in the nearby Radcliffe Infirmary.

The observatory building, at a site on Woodstock Road, commenced to designs by Henry Keene in 1772 and was completed in 1794 to the designs of James Wyatt. It has a prominent octagonal tower based on the Tower of the Winds in Athens, topped with a statue by John Bacon of Atlas holding up the World.

Until 1839, the Savilian Chair of Astronomy was responsible for the observatory. At this date the appointment of George Henry Sacheverell Johnson – an astronomer with no observational experience – caused the creation of the new role of Radcliffe Observer.

Because of the viewing conditions, weather, urban development and light pollution at Oxford, the observatory was moved to South Africa in 1939. Eventually that site, in Pretoria, also became untenable and the facility was combined with others into the South African Astronomical Observatory (SAAO) in the 1970s.

The building is now used by Green Templeton College and is a centrepiece of the college. The original instruments are now in the Museum of the History of Science, Oxford, except for the Radcliffe 18/24-inch Twin Refractor telescope, which was transferred to the University of London Observatory.

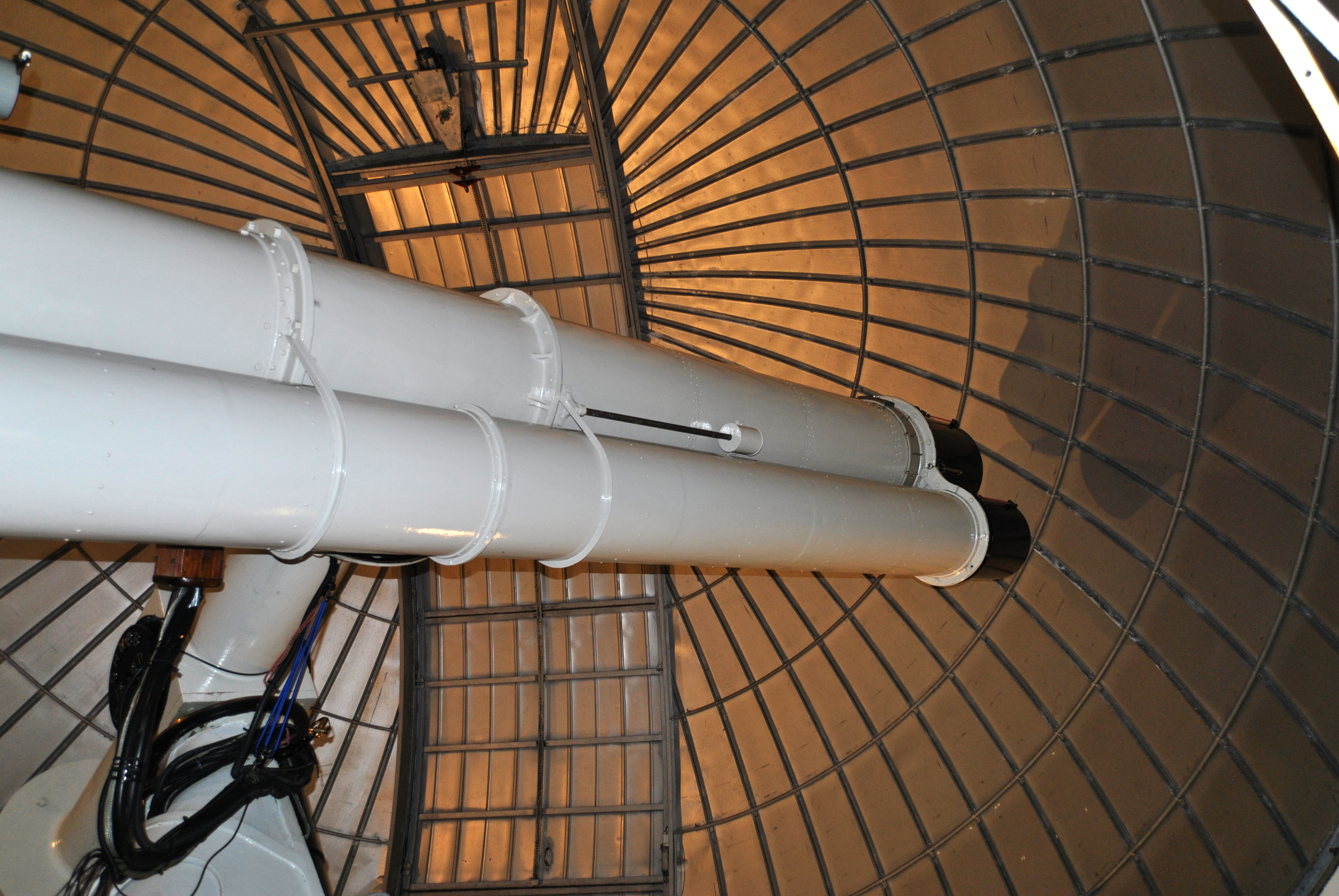
The Radcliffe 18/24 inch twin refractor telescope was moved to the University of London Observatory when the Radcliffe Observatory closed.

== Radcliffe Observers ==
The following have been Radcliffe Observers:

- 1839 Manuel John Johnson
- 1860 Robert Main
- 1879 Edward James Stone
- 1897 Arthur Alcock Rambaut
- 1924 Harold Knox-Shaw
- 1950 David Thackeray

== Gallery ==
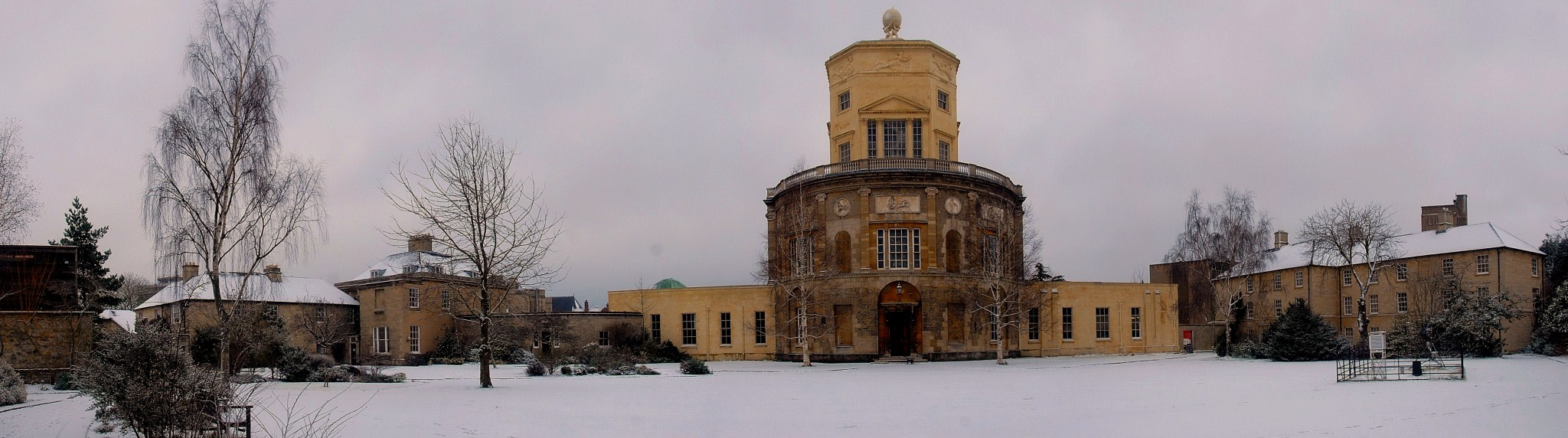
Panoramic view of the observatory in the snow

== See also ==
- Observatory Street to the north
- Radcliffe Observatory Quarter, a local development project
