= Andronicus of Cyrrhus =

Greek astronomer

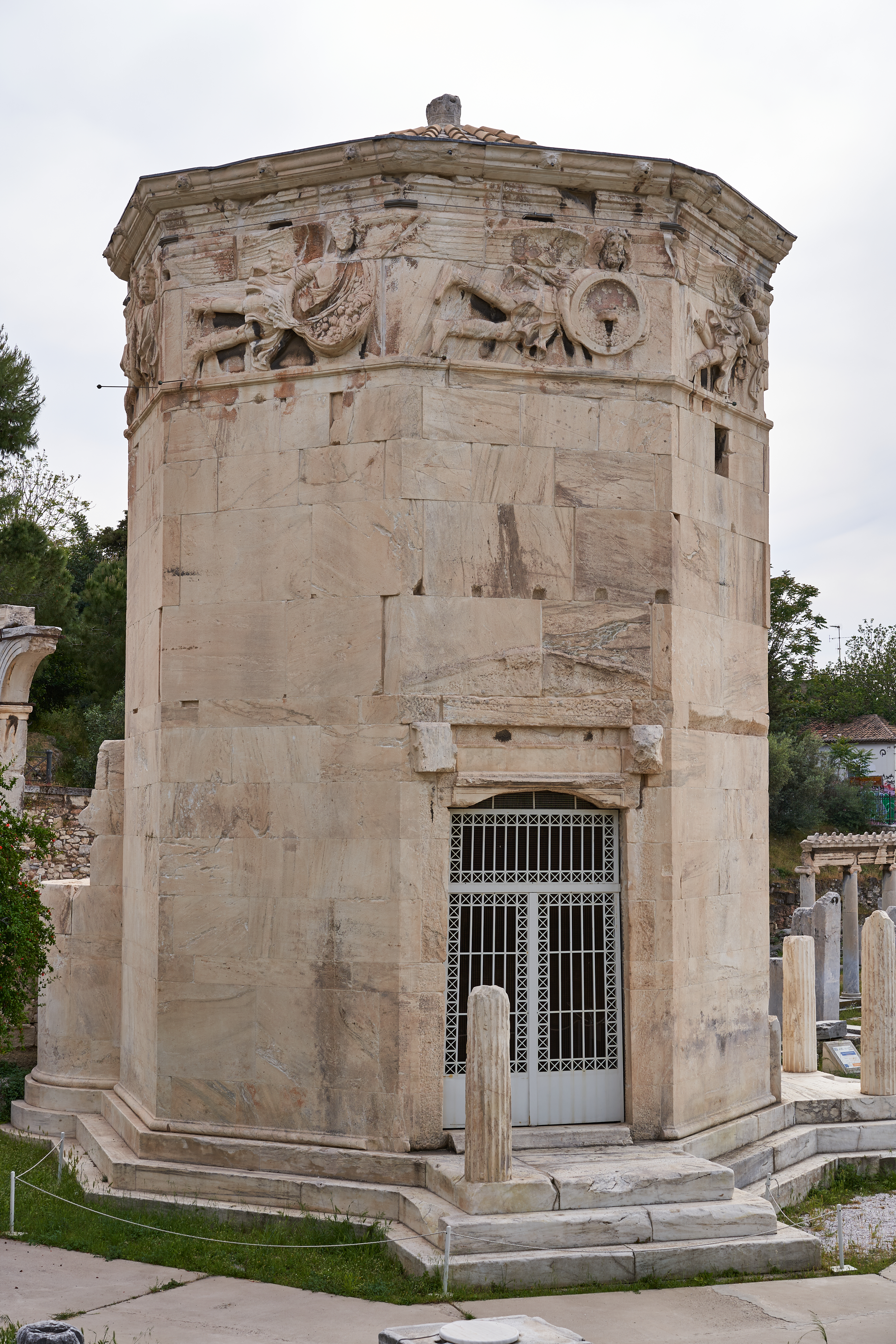
The Tower of the Winds, Athens

Andronicus of Cyrrhus or Andronicus Cyrrhestes (Latin; Ancient Greek: Ἀνδρόνικος Κυρρήστης, Andrónikos Kyrrhēstēs; fl. c. 100 BC) was a Macedonian astronomer best known for designing the Tower of the Winds in Roman Athens.

== Life ==
Little is known about the life of Andronicus, although his father is recorded as Hermias. It is usually assumed that he came from the Cyrrhus in Macedonia rather than the one in Syria.

== Work ==
Andronicus is usually credited with the construction of the Tower of the Winds in the Roman forum at Athens around 50 BC, a considerable portion of which still exists. It is octagonal, with figures of the eight principal winds (Anemoi) carved on the appropriate side. Originally, a bronze figure of Triton was placed on the summit that was turned round by the wind so that the rod in his hand pointed to the correct wind direction, an idea replicated with subsequent wind vanes. The interior housed a large clepsydra and there were multiple sundials on the exterior, so that it functioned as a kind of early clocktower.

He also built a multifaced sundial for the Temple of Poseidon on the island of Tinos.
