= Keith Tritton =

- Born: 1944 (age 81–82); Brighton, United Kingdom
- Scientific career
- Fields: Astronomer

Keith Peter Tritton (born 1944) is a British astronomer and observatory manager who has worked in various different parts of the world. He joined the Royal Greenwich Observatory (then at Herstmonceux in Sussex) in 1967 as a research astronomer and later worked at the Radcliffe Observatory in South Africa and the Royal Observatory Edinburgh. He spent a number of years as a university lecturer in the Philippines and in Thailand. His particular interest is observational astronomy. He was head of the UK Schmidt Telescope in Australia and of the Isaac Newton Group of telescopes in the Canary Islands. In 1987, he returned to the Royal Greenwich Observatory and moved with them to Cambridge in 1990, where he became head of the Astronomy Division. He took early retirement in 1997. Between 1995 and 2011 he was an Associate Lecturer in astronomy and planetary science with the Open University.

He is the discoverer of comet 157P/Tritton.

The asteroid 46442 Keithtritton is named after him.

== Contributions ==
About 40 papers in observational astronomy, particularly in optical monitoring of quasars, optical identification of radio sources, optical instrumentation and astronomical photography.

== Books ==
- Low Light Level Detectors in Astronomy, with M J Eccles and M Elizabeth Sim; Cambridge University Press 1983, ISBN 0521240883 and (in Russian) Mir Moskva 1986.
- Earth, Life and the Universe: Exploring Our Cosmic Ancestry; Curved Air Publications 2001, ISBN 0954099109.
