= Faculty of Linguistics, Philology & Phonetics, University of Oxford =

Department of the University of Oxford, England

The Faculty of Linguistics, Philology & Phonetics is an academic department of the Humanities Division at the University of Oxford in Oxford, England, United Kingdom.

It was created in 2008, uniting the discipline which had previously been studied across a variety of other departments. The faculty is based at the Centre for Linguistics & Philology in the Clarendon Institute building on Walton Street, between Worcester College and Little Clarendon Street. It is part of Oxford's Humanities Division.

== Research ==
Research is currently in the following areas:

- Phonology
- Psycholinguistics and neurolinguistics
- Romance linguistics
- Semantics
- Syntax
- Philology
- Phonetics
