= Mattli (surname) =

Mattli is a surname. Notable people with the surname include:

- Georg Mattli (1954–1991), Swiss ice hockey player
- Giuseppe Mattli (1907–1982), Swiss fashion designer known as "Mattli"
- Walter Mattli, Swiss-born British political scientist
