= Eugene Rogan =

American historian of the Near and Middle East (born 1960)

Professor Eugene Rogan FBA
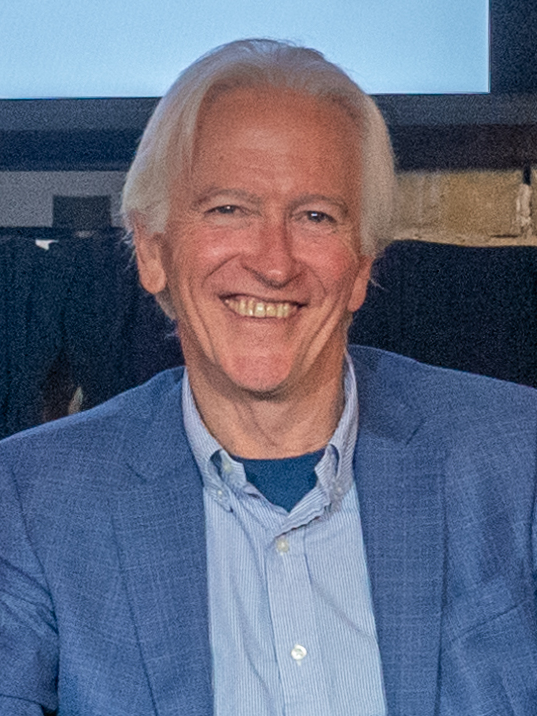
- Rogan at the 2024 Chiswick Book Festival
- Born: Eugene Lawrence Rogan; October 31, 1960 (age 65); Burbank, California
- Occupation: Historian
- Spouse: Ngaire Woods
- Children: 2

Academic background
- Education: Columbia University (BA), Harvard University (MA, PhD)

Academic work
- Institutions: St Antony's College, Oxford
- Notable works: The Arabs: A History

Eugene Lawrence Rogan, FBA (born 31 October 1960) is an American historian of the Middle East and North Africa from the late Ottoman era to the present. He is currently Professor of Modern Middle Eastern History at the University of Oxford.

== Education and career ==
After completing his undergraduate degree at Columbia University in economics, he pursued a master's degree in Middle Eastern studies at Harvard University, graduating in 1984, after which he completed a doctorate in Middle Eastern studies at the same university in 1991. Rogan joined the University of Oxford's Faculty of Oriental Studies as a lecturer in 1991. Since 1991, he has been a Fellow at St Antony's College, Oxford, and Professor of Modern Middle Eastern History at the University of Oxford since 2015.

== Honours ==
In July 2017, Rogan was elected a Fellow of the British Academy (FBA), the United Kingdom's national academy for the humanities and social sciences.

== Personal life ==
Rogan is married to Oxford professor Ngaire Woods, who is also the founding dean of the Blavatnik School of Government. They have two children together.

== Selected works ==
- Frontiers of the State in the Late Ottoman Empire (Cambridge University Press, 1999).
- The War for Palestine: Rewriting the History of 1948 (Cambridge University Press, 2001).
- Outside In: On the Margins of the Modern Middle East (I.B. Tauris, 2002).
- The Arabs: A History (Penguin, 2009; 3rd revised ed. 2018).
- The Fall of the Ottomans: The Great War in the Middle East, 1914–1920 (Penguin, 2015).
- The Damascus Events: The 1860 Massacre and the Destruction of the Old Ottoman World (Penguin, 2024).
