= G&D =

G&D may refer to:

- Gabriel & Dresden
- Giesecke & Devrient
- Gorre & Daphetid
- G&D's
