= Freud, Oxford =

Café-bar in Jericho, Oxford, England

Coordinates: 51.75946°N 1.26478°W

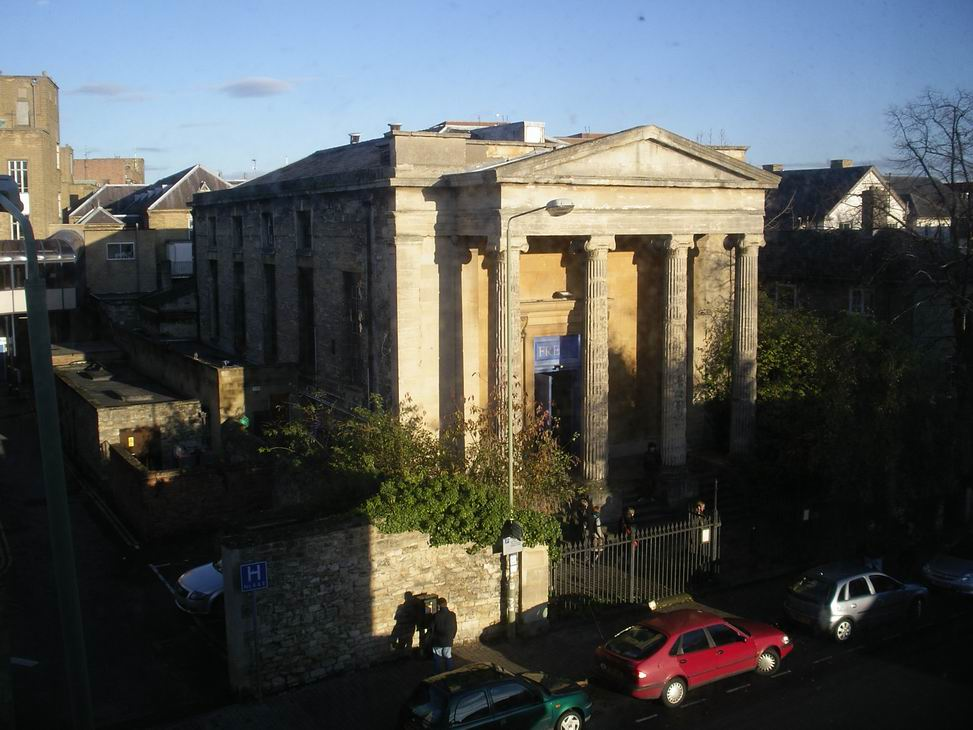
- View of Freud café in Oxford from the northwest, across Walton Street
- Interactive map of Freud, Oxford

Restaurant information
- Established: 1988
- Closed: 2025
- Location: Oxford, England

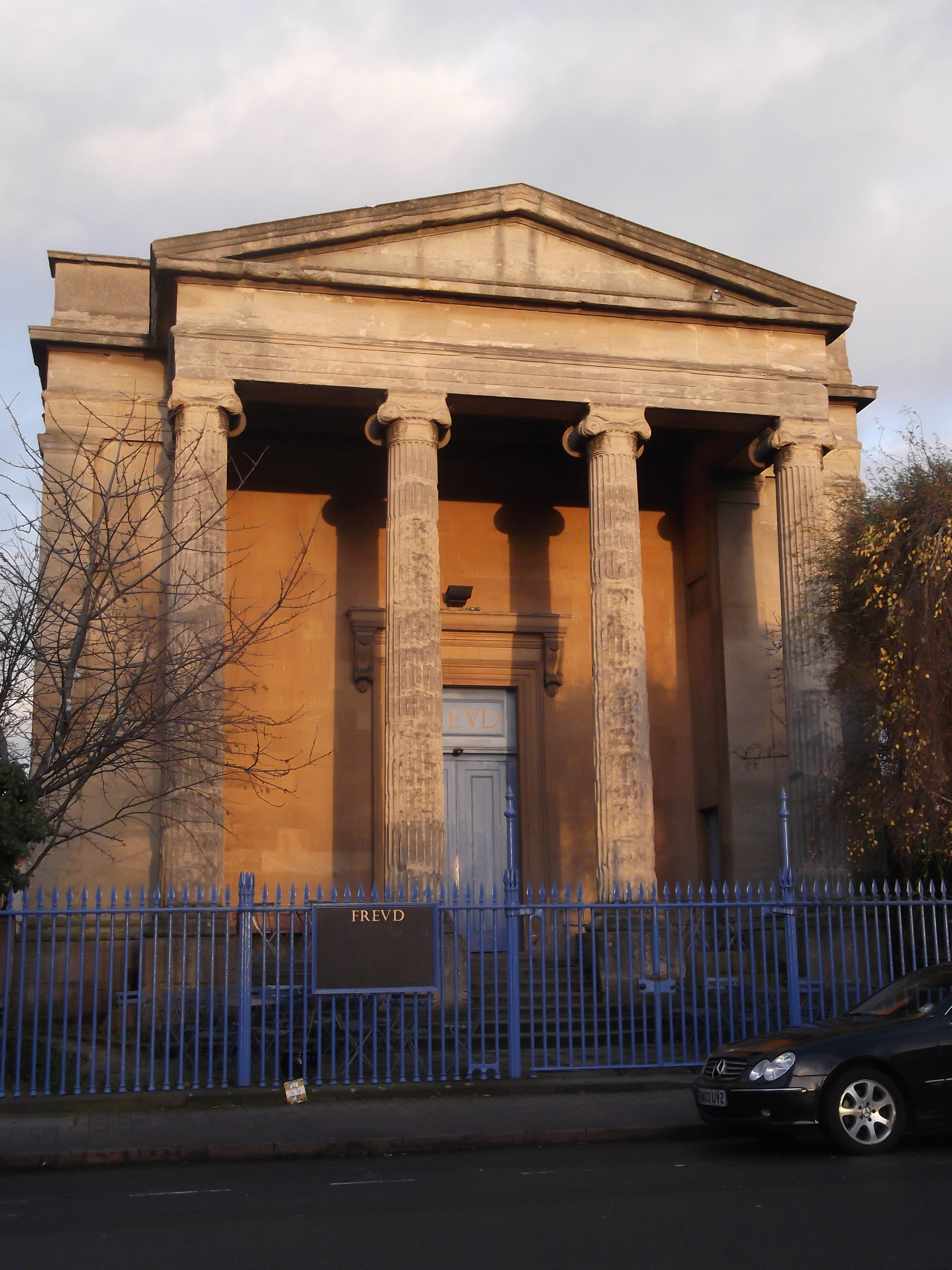
Freud café portico entrance

Freud (aka Freud's) is a former café-bar in a Victorian church building at 119 Walton Street in Jericho, Oxford, England.

The Freud café is located opposite Great Clarendon Street and the Oxford University Press is also opposite to the south. It is surrounded by the Radcliffe Observatory Quarter of the University of Oxford, formerly the Radcliffe Infirmary site.

The Freud café is housed in the former St Paul's Church, a Greek Revival building designed in 1836 by Henry Jones Underwood. The church was inspired by an outbreak of cholera in the area in 1831. The building has an imposing portico with Ionic columns. The architect Edward George Bruton added the apse in 1853 and Frederick Charles Eden remodelled the interior in 1908.

In the 20th century, the church became redundant and was closed in the late 1960s. After deconsecration, the building was bought by the Oxford Area Arts Council and used as a theatre and arts centre venue. In 1988, the building was acquired by Secession Ltd to prevent the building's demolition. Freud opened as a café/bar in the same year. The cafe was created by David Freud, a graduate of the Courtauld Institute of Art, who had an interest in buildings and their interaction with people.

The cafe operated for some years, but closed down as a venue by 2025. While it was in use, the cafe occasionally hosted live music, including jazz, punk, post-punk and blues. The name of the venue was written in Roman-style capital lettering as "FREVD", above the main entrance door.

In 2015, a new building for the Blavatnik School of Government of Oxford University on the Radcliffe Observatory Quarter site was opened immediately to the south of Freud. The scheme was opposed by the cafe's owner, David Freud, because of its size and height compared to the church building. In December 2025, The University of Oxford announced that Freud had been purchased for the University, by Len Blavatnik, and that the building would be 'brought back into a safe and usable condition' for the use of the Blavatnik school, and the wider community.

There is another Freud café-bar in London.

== See also ==
- List of Italian restaurants
