= Stephen A. Schwarzman Centre for the Humanities =

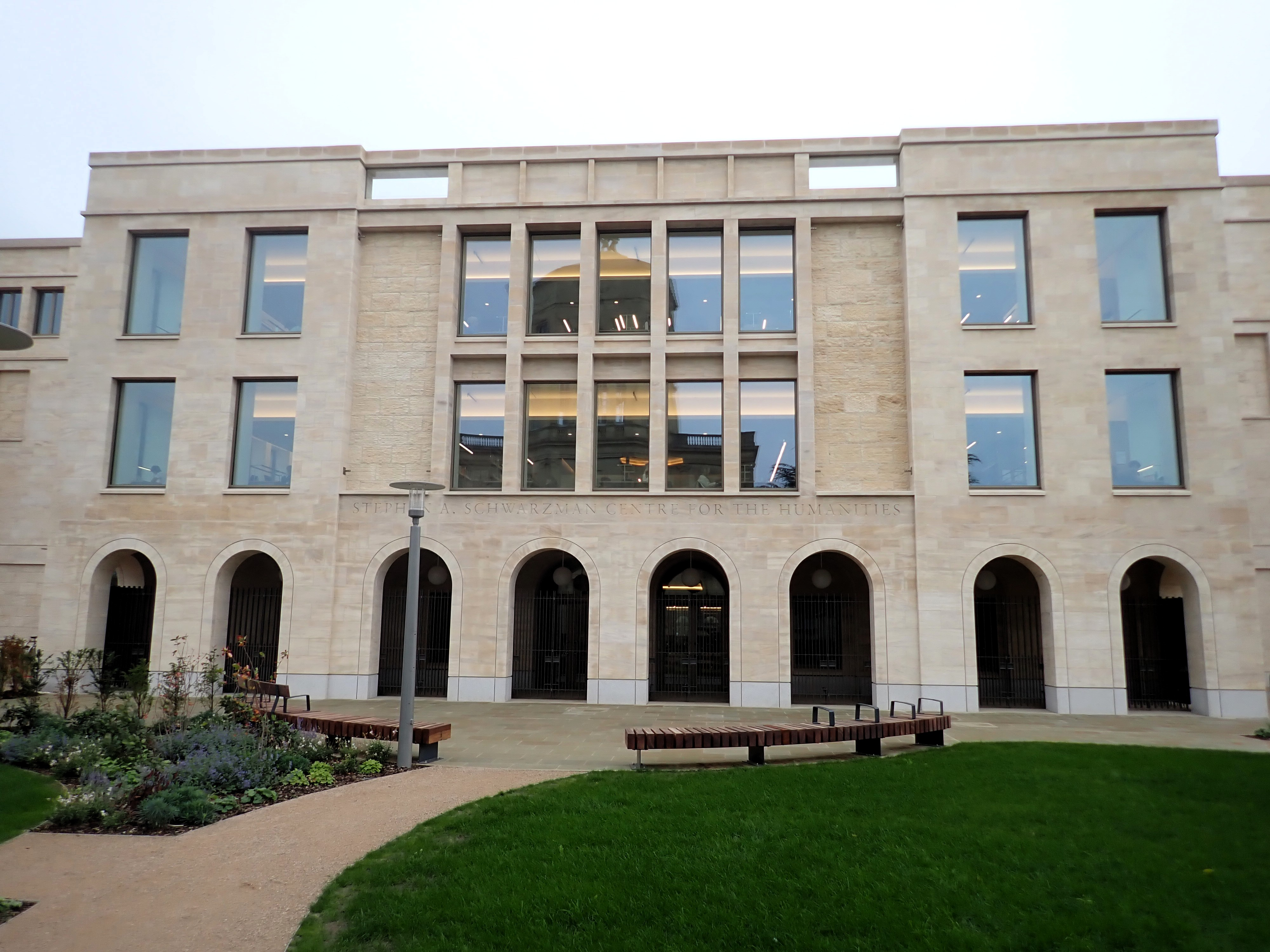

General information
- Location: Radcliffe Observatory Quarter, Oxford
- Coordinates: 51.760009°N 1.2639676°W
- Groundbreaking: February 2023
- Opened: 13 October 2025
- Owner: Oxford University

Technical details
- Size: 25,300 sq metre

Design and construction
- Architecture firm: Hopkins Architects

Website
- www.schwarzmancentre.ox.ac.uk

The Stephen A. Schwarzman Centre for the Humanities, part of the University of Oxford, is a building dedicated to the arts and humanities. Largely funded by a donation from Stephen A. Schwarzman, construction started in February 2023 and was completed in 2025. The centre includes a concert hall, exhibition space, and lecturing and academic facilities.

== History ==
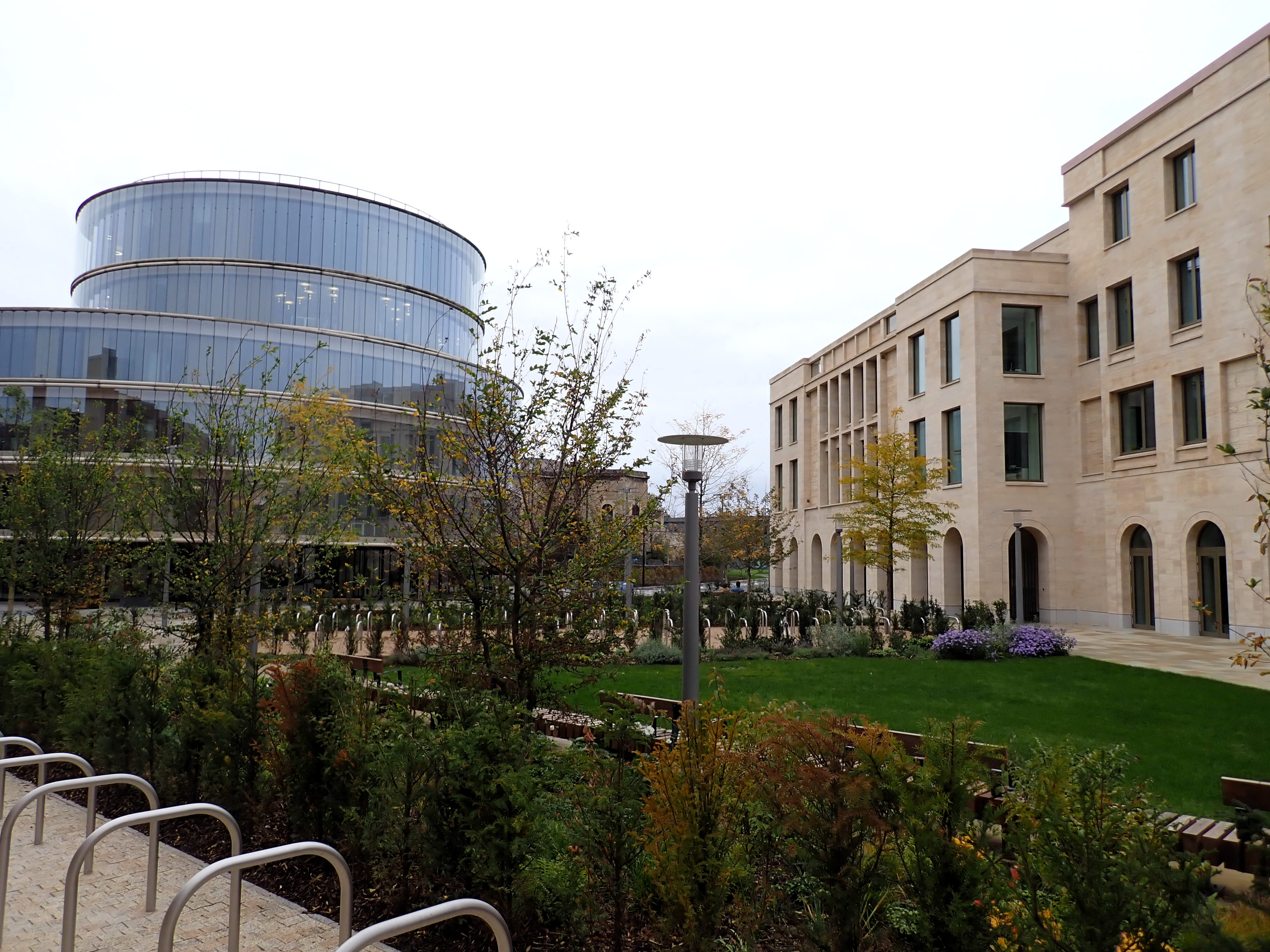
Schwarzman Centre for the Humanities with the Blavatnik School of Government

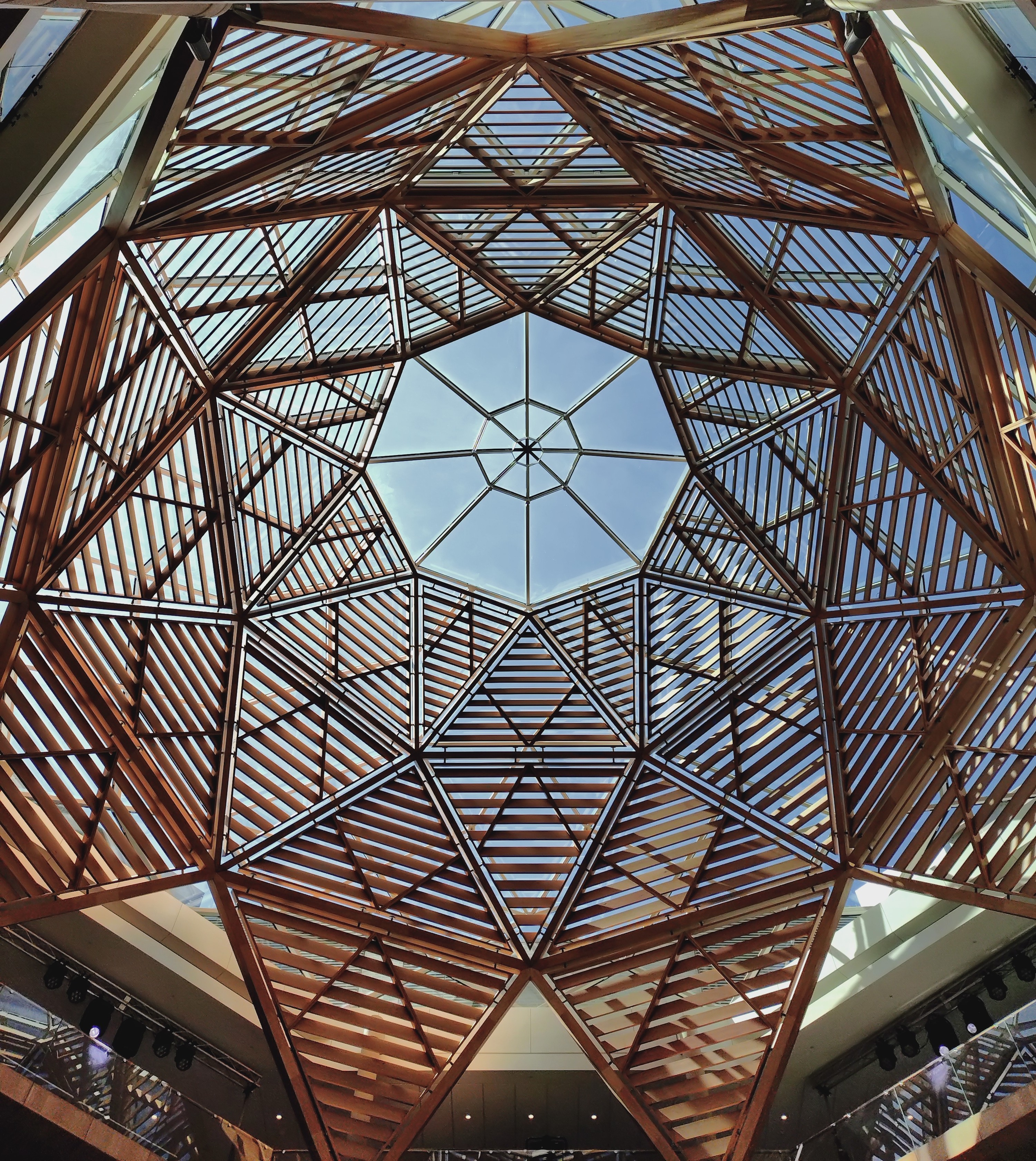
Schwarzman Centre for the Humanities Atrium Ceiling

In 2019 it was announced that US billionaire Stephen A. Schwarzman was providing £150 million to the University of Oxford, to fund research into humanities and the ethics of Artificial Intelligence. This included the construction of a new eponymous Centre and library.

The building was designed by Hopkins Architects and is located in the Radcliffe Observatory Quarter, next to the Blavatnik School of Government, Somerville College, the Radcliffe Observatory, and several faculties. The 25,300 sq metre structure is clad in limestone and cream brickwork, which Architecture Today stated fits "comfortably among Oxford’s traditional limestone palette". Construction started in February 2023 and it opened to students in October 2025. At time of construction it was the largest single building project undertaken by the University of Oxford. According to the Observer newspaper the full cost of the building was undisclosed, however Schwarzman himself donated £185 million.

The ground floor of the building - including a concert hall, a cinema, a set of exhibition spaces, a cafe, and a restaurant - is accessible to the wider public. The upper floors include the combined Humanities Library and the central administrative hubs for the relevant academic faculties: English Language and Literature, History, Medieval and Modern Languages, Music, Linguistics, Philology and Phonetics, Philosophy, Theology and Religion, the Oxford Internet Institute, and the new Institute for Ethics in AI. Public access, and events, were planned from the outset. The building also contains a 250-seat theatre, a black box studio theatre, and a dance studio. The new concert hall has been welcomed by musicians due to the relative lack of music venues in the city.

Saturday 25 April 2026 saw the inaugural 'Open House' event, welcoming visitors for a range of musical and artistic performances, lectures, and visual displays.

Stephen A. Schwarzman Centre for the Humanities has achieved Passivhaus certification, earning the title of Europe’s largest Passivhaus university building, and the world’s first Passivhaus concert hall.

The Centre has faced criticism, including from the student body, for the source of its funding.
