= Radcliffe Observatory Quarter =

Oxford University site in England

Coordinates: 51°45′38″N 1°15′50″W

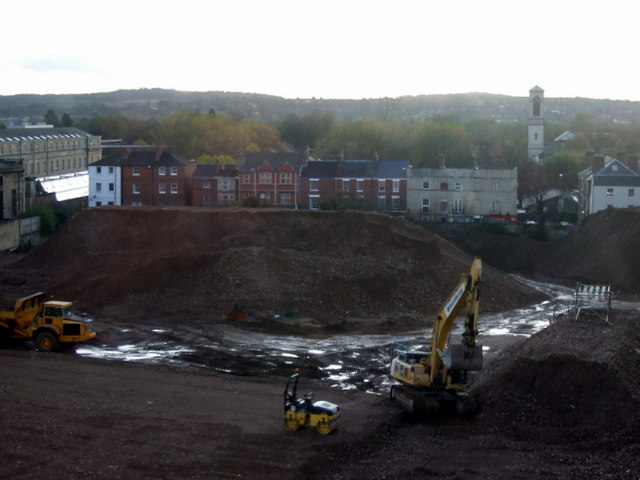
View of the Radcliffe Observatory Quarter from the Radcliffe Observatory, looking towards Walton Street.

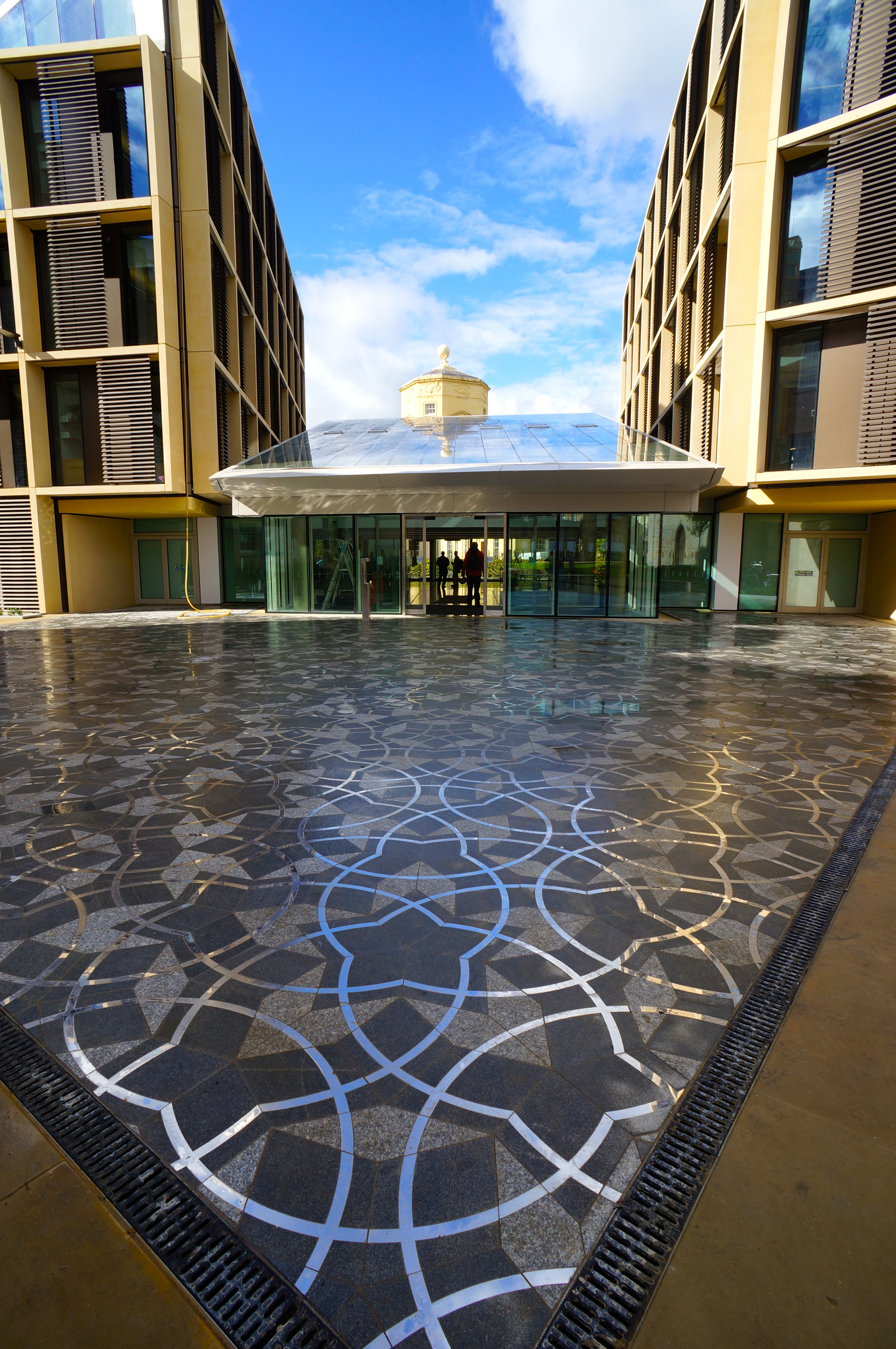
The entrance of the new Andrew Wiles Mathematical Institute with Penrose tiling.

The Radcliffe Observatory Quarter (ROQ) is a major University of Oxford development project in Oxford, England, in the estate of the old Radcliffe Infirmary hospital. The site, covering 10 acres (3.7 hectares) is in central north Oxford. It is bounded by Observatory Street and Green Templeton College to the north, the Woodstock Road to the east, Somerville College to the south, and Walton Street to the west. The project and the new university area is named after the grade I listed Radcliffe Observatory to the north east of the site, now the centrepiece of Green Templeton College, which is intended to form the visual centrepiece of the project.

== History ==
In 2009, planning permission was granted by Oxford City Council for the refurbishment of the grade II* listed Radcliffe Infirmary (the oldest wing of the hospital) and the grade II listed St Luke's Chapel and Outpatients Building, which flank the entrance courtyard. The chapel is now deconsecrated and serves as a venue for events. Archaeological excavations were undertaken by the Museum of London. The remains of three Bronze Age barrows and ring ditches were found, together with evidence of settlement in Saxon times.

New accommodation at Somerville College opened in September 2011. For 2012, the Radcliffe Infirmary was refurbished for occupation by the Humanities Divisional Office, the Faculty of Philosophy, and the Philosophy and Theology Libraries before the construction of the Schwarzman Centre for the Humanities.

In June 2012, New Radcliffe House, by Walton Street on the ROQ development site, was completed by the construction company Longcross. The Jericho Health Centre moved into the ground floor of this new building shortly afterwards.

A new Mathematical Institute for the University of Oxford has been built on the site, named after the mathematician Sir Andrew Wiles, who proved Fermat's Last Theorem. The site also includes a Humanities Building and Library, the Nuffield Department of Primary Care Health Sciences, and the Blavatnik School of Government.

Construction of the Blavatnik School of Government finished in 2015. It is a 22-meter-tall (72 ft) building immediately south of Freud's café on Walton Street, designed by the Swiss architects Herzog & de Meuron, using a £75 million donation from the billionaire Leonard Blavatnik. The Campaign to Protect Port Meadow that has been formed to protest against the Oxford University Castle Mill graduate housing development south of Port Meadow was opposed to this proposal as well due to its impact on the Oxford skyline.

In March 2016, Oxford University's Nuffield Department of Primary Care Health Sciences relocated from New Radcliffe House to the refurbished Outpatient's Building, adjacent to the old Radcliffe Infirmary. Following a £14m investment, the Grade II-listed outpatients building has been transformed into a new research and teaching centre for primary care researchers. It had been empty since 2007, when the outpatient services were transferred to the West Wing of the John Radcliffe Hospital in Headington.

=== Humanities building ===
After securing planning permission for a new Humanities building in 2010, construction was put on hold due to the 'uncertain financial climate.' In 2015, a spokesman for the university said that the university planned to begin construction of a new Humanities building on the site in 2018. However, the head of the Humanities Division later said that construction would begin in 2021. In June 2019, the university announced that Stephen A. Schwarzman had donated £150 million (this later raised to £185m) to establish the Schwarzman Centre for the Humanities. The Centre was handed over by the builders Laing O'Rourke, who had been contracted by the firm Hopkins Architects as the principal contractor, at the beginning of September 2025 and was officially opened to students at the start of October that year The Centre is built to Passivhaus energy standards and is the largest such building thus far in the UK.

The Schwarzman Centre is not only a building for Faculty and students but a building open to all, with ground floor public spaces (including a café) and a varied Cultural performance programme.

Other Works

Redevelopment work continues on or adjacent to the site with Green Templeton's South façade and garden being completed, as part of phase one of works, in April 2026, and Somerville College starting works as of April 2026

Gallery

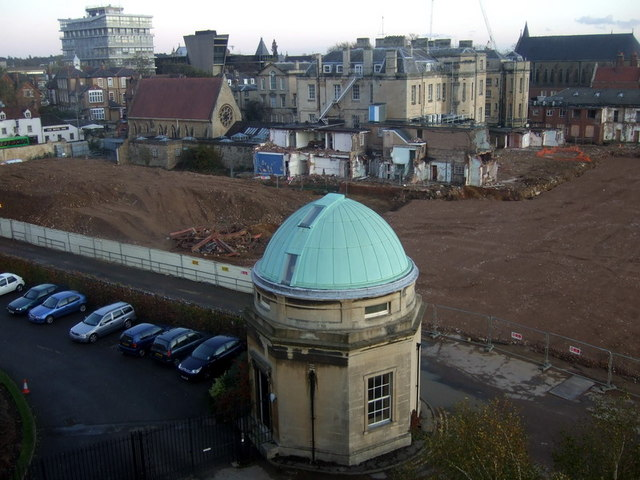
Archaeological excavations by the Museum of London in 2009, with the Radcliffe Infirmary building in the background

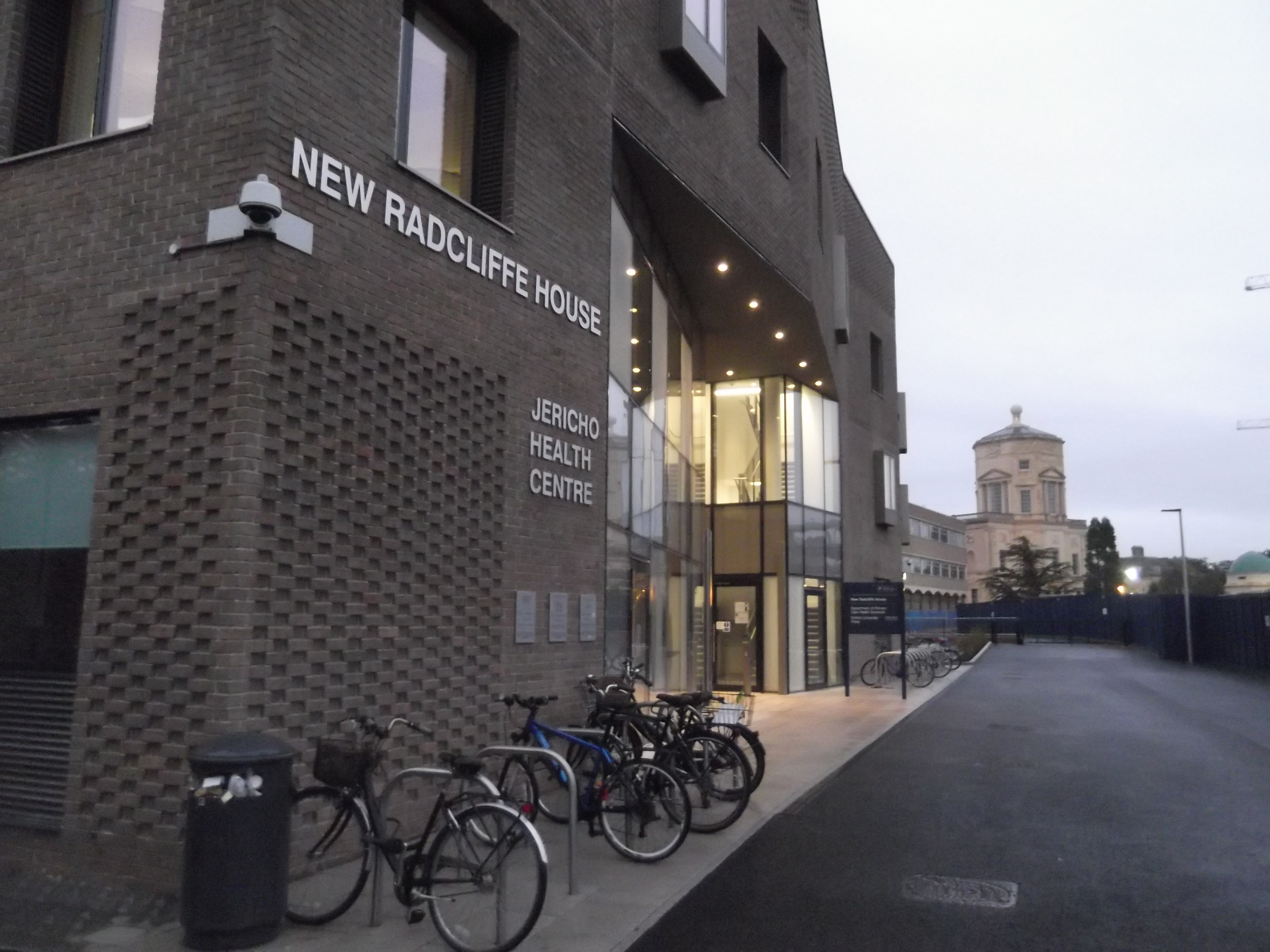
New Radcliffe House in the Radcliffe Observatory Quarter, housing the Jericho Health Centre, with the tower of the Radcliffe Observatory in the background

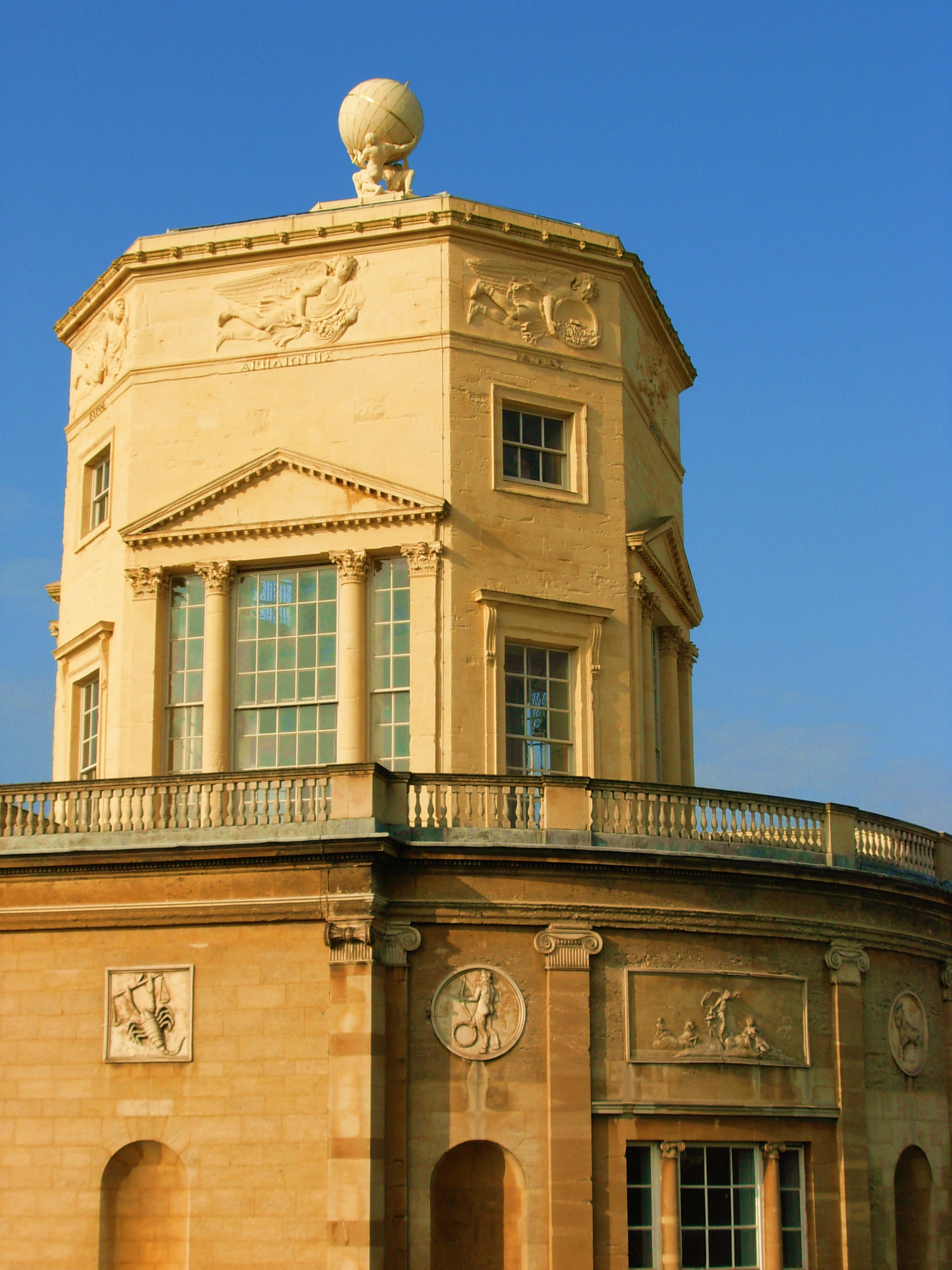
The Radcliffe Observatory, after which the ROQ project is named

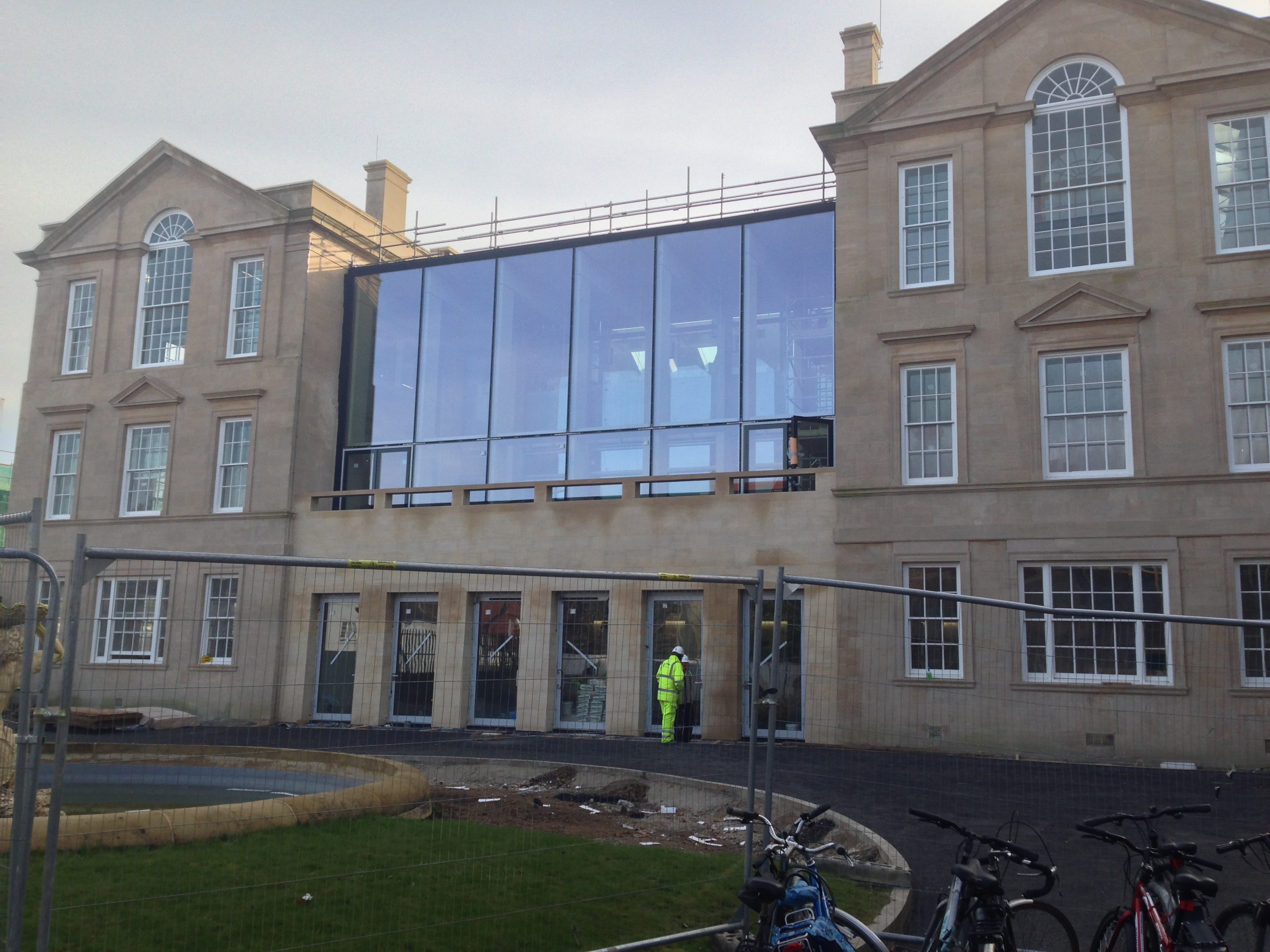
Refit of the former outpatients' building into a new health research and teaching centre for the University of Oxford
