= Karthik Ramanna =

Professor at Oxford University, England

- Citizenship: American
- Occupation: Economist

Academic background
- Education: Massachusetts Institute of Technology

Academic work
- Discipline: Economist
- Sub-discipline: Financial Regulation
- Institutions: Oxford University
- Website: https://www.bsg.ox.ac.uk/people/karthik-ramanna

Karthik Ramanna is Professor of Business & Public Policy and Director of the Master of Public Policy Program at the University of Oxford’s Blavatnik School of Government. From 2016 to 2023, he was director of Oxford’s Master of Public Policy Program, where he established the leadership curriculum on building trust across divided communities.

== Career ==
Ramanna received his doctorate from the Massachusetts Institute of Technology’s Sloan School of Management in 2007 whereupon he joined the faculty of Harvard Business School.

Ramanna's scholarship has also explored regulation and decision-making at the Financial Accounting Standards Board and the International Accounting Standards Board. He has also written about the costs and benefits of fair value accounting. His 2015 book Political Standards posits that accounting rule-making is an exemplar of a "thin political market," a regulatory setting of economic consequence in which the general public is largely disinterested and where corporate special interests possess relevant tacit knowledge. This situation can result in regulatory capture.

Ramanna is a proponent of reforming business ethics education, arguing that corporate managers have unique capabilities and duties to steward the basic institutions of capitalism. Prior to Oxford, Ramanna taught leadership, ethics, and financial reporting at Harvard Business School, where he won the International Case Centre's Outstanding Case-Writer prize, dubbed by the Financial Times as “the business school Oscars.” He was recruited to Oxford’s government school from Harvard to help develop the case method of education for public administration, and he has since won the Outstanding Case-Writer prize at Oxford as well.

In 2019, he advised on the UK’s reforms of the audit profession. In 2021, he co-developed with Robert S. Kaplan the E-liability method for climate accounting as an alternative to the GHG Protocol’s Scope 3 standard, which they posited has hindered innovation on emissions reduction. The E-liability method won the Harvard Business Review-McKinsey Prize for “groundbreaking management thinking.”

In 2023, Ramanna was named an advisor to the U.S. Public Company Accounting Oversight Board.

== Publications ==
- Ramanna, K. Political Standards: Corporate Interest, Ideology, and Leadership in the Shaping of Accounting Rules for the Market Economy, Chicago: University of Chicago Press, 2015; ISBN 0-2262-1074-X
- Ramanna, K. “Building a Culture of Challenge in Audit Firms,” PwC Future of Audit Initiative, 2019: 1 - 26.
- Ramanna, K. “Friedman at 50: Is it Still the Social Responsibility of Business to Increase Profits?,” California Management Review, 2020, 62, no. 3: 28 – 41.
- Kaplan, Robert S., and Karthik Ramanna. “Accounting for Climate Change.” Harvard Business Review, 2021, 99, nos. 11/12: 120 – 131.
