= Jericho Health Centre =

Health centre in Oxford, England

Coordinates: 51.7606°N 1.2671°W

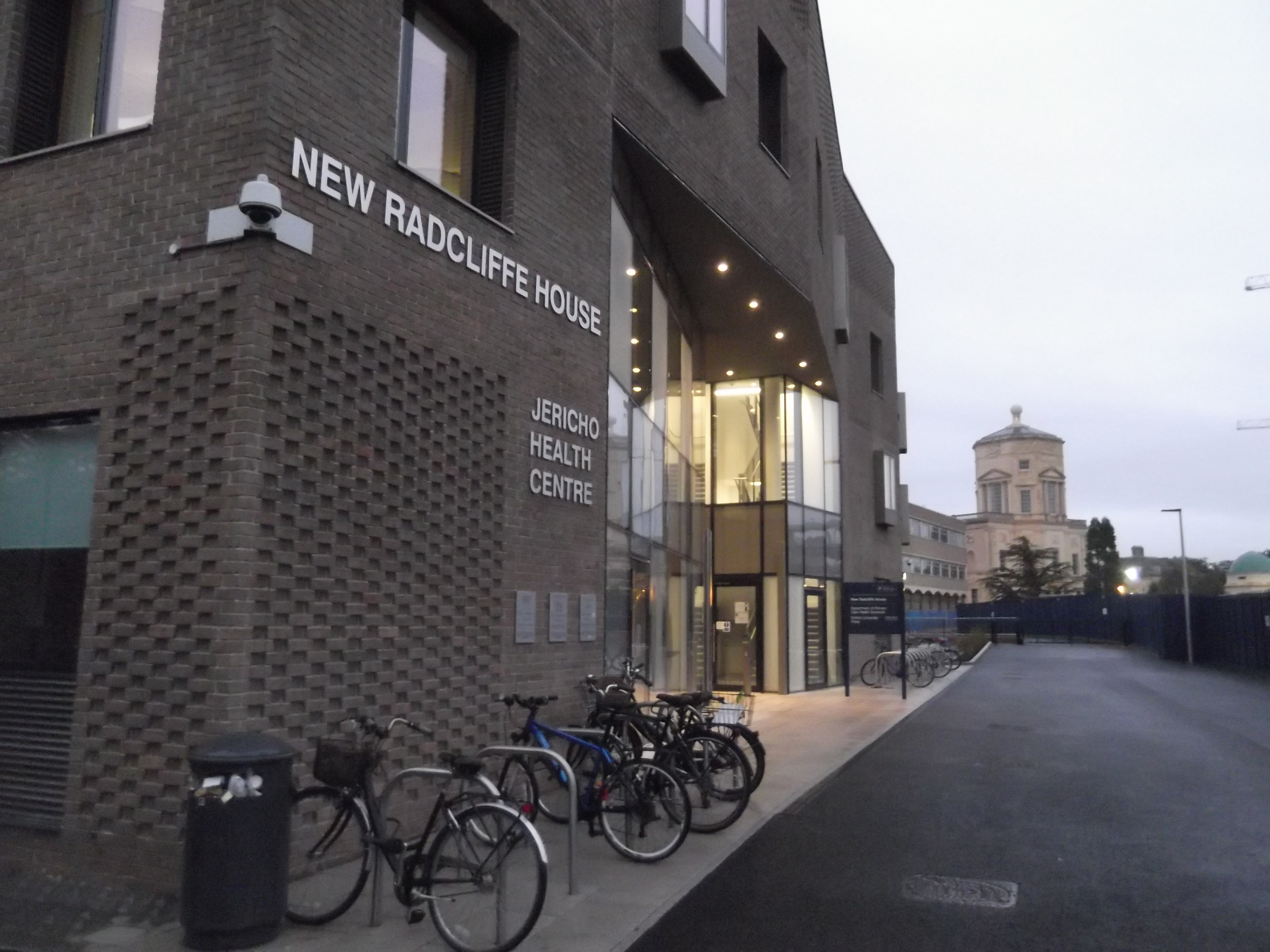
New Radcliffe House in the Radcliffe Observatory Quarter, housing the Jericho Health Centre, with the tower of the Radcliffe Observatory in the background

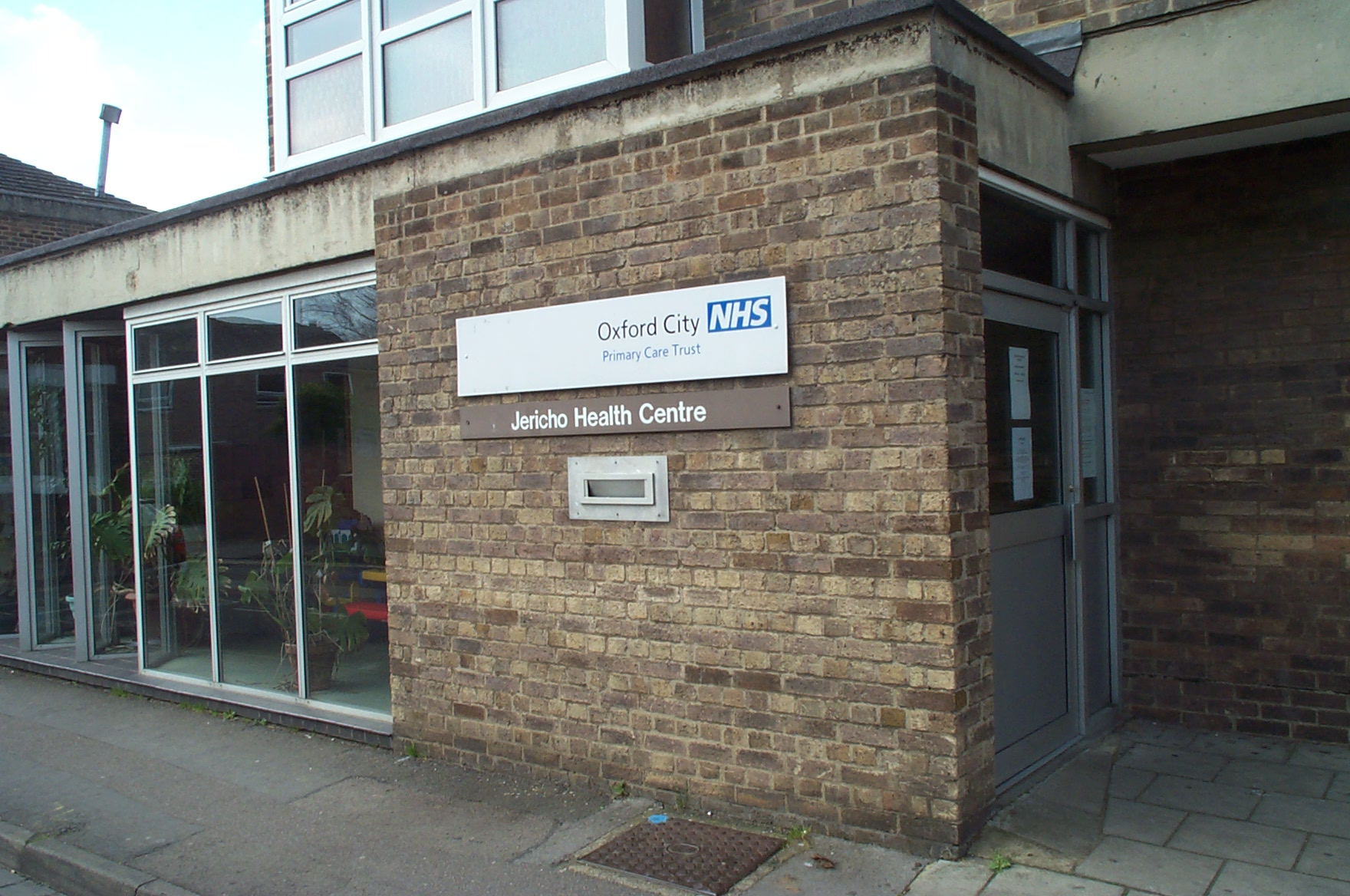
The previous Jericho Health Centre building, Oxford

Jericho Health Centre is a health centre on Walton Street in Oxford, England. It is named after the district of Jericho, just northwest of central Oxford. It is part of the United Kingdom's National Health Service (NHS).

In June 2012, New Radcliffe House, further south on the opposite side of Walton Street, on the Radcliffe Observatory Quarter development site, was completed by the construction company Longcross. The centre moved into the ground floor of this new building in 2012. The architects were Hawkins\Brown, based in London, and the building cost £11 million. Its location has opened up a view of the historic Grade I listed Radcliffe Observatory from Walton Street. The building is owned by Oxford University and the ground floor is leased to the NHS.

There are two separate practices in the building: Dr Leaver and partners, and The Observatory Medical Practice. The local district nurses and health visitors are also based in the building.

== See also ==
- Family medicine
- General practitioner
- Primary care
