= Ngaire Woods =

New Zealand academic in the UK

Ngaire Woods CBE
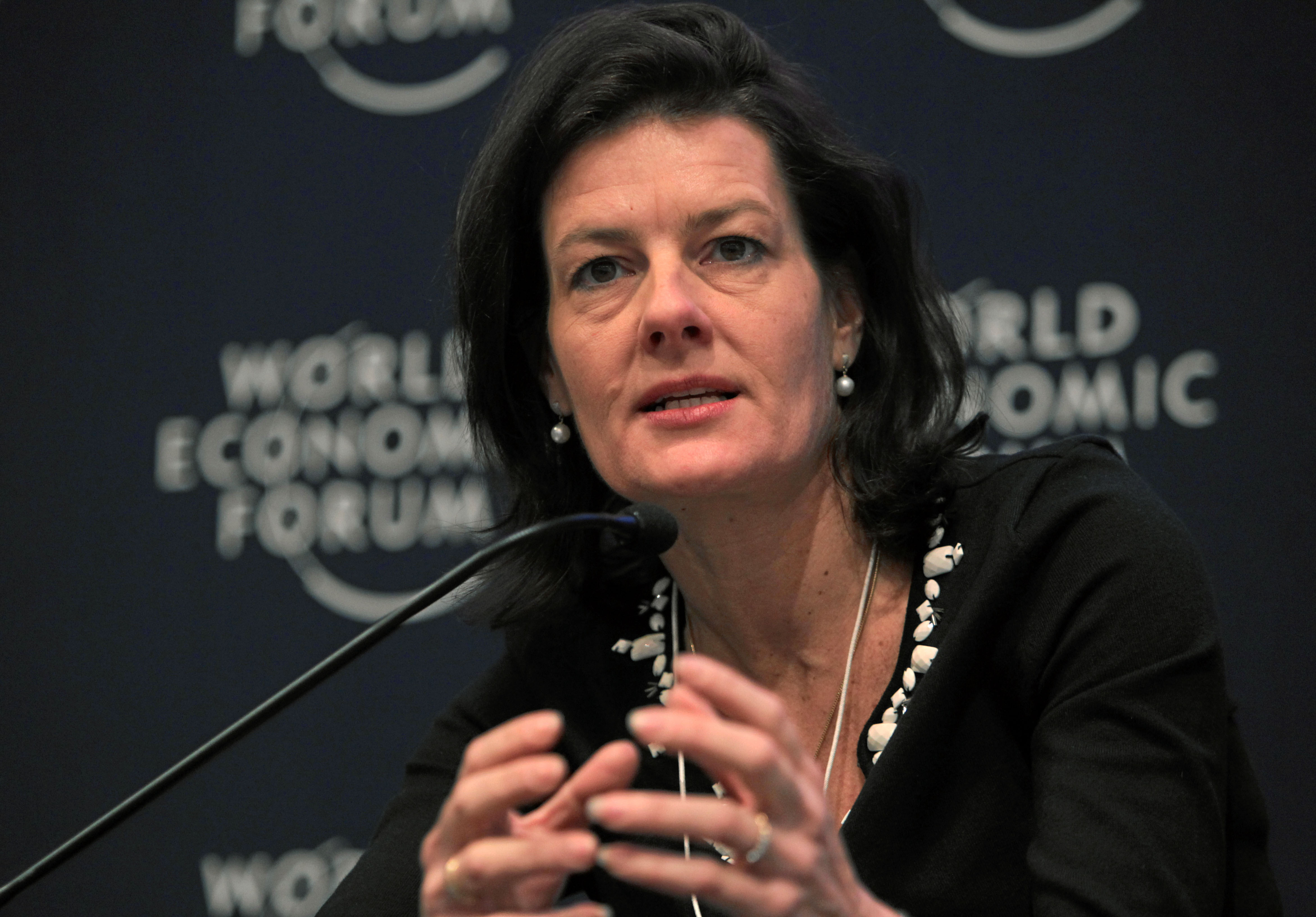
- Ngaire Woods at the World Economic Forum Annual Meeting in 2011
- Born: February 13, 1963 (age 63); New Zealand
- Education: University of Auckland (BA); Balliol College, Oxford (MPhil, DPhil)
- Spouse: Eugene Rogan
- Children: 2
- Scientific career
- Workplaces: University College, Oxford
- Thesis: Ethics and interests in the international political economy: the management of Mexican debt, 1982–1989 (1992)
- Website: bsg.ox.ac.uk/people/ngaire-woods

Ngaire Tui Woods CBE (/ˈnaɪri/ NY-ree; born 13 February 1963) is the founding dean of the Blavatnik School of Government and professor of Global Economic Governance at the University of Oxford.

As an academic and researcher, she specializes in global economic governance, globalization challenges, global development, and the role of international institutions.

Woods was appointed Commander of the Most Excellent Order of the British Empire (CBE) in the 2018 New Year's Honours for services to higher education and public policy.

== Education and early life ==
Woods was born in New Zealand and grew up in Torbay, Auckland.

She is the fourth of five children and was brought up by her mother. Woods attended Rangitoto College in Mairangi Bay, Auckland, where she was head girl in 1980. She began working at the age of 12 and worked in various jobs including working in a restaurant and volunteering on a helpline for women in abusive relationships.

She then attended the University of Auckland where she graduated with a Bachelor of Arts degree in economics and a Bachelor of Laws degree. She studied at Balliol College, Oxford, as a Rhodes Scholar, completing Master of Philosophy and Doctor of Philosophy degrees in international relations.

From 1990 to 1992, she was a junior research fellow at New College, Oxford, and subsequently taught at the Government Department at Harvard University before taking up her fellowship at University College, Oxford.

== Career ==
Woods established herself as a scholar at Oxford, focusing on global economic governance and the role of international institutions. In the early 2000s she founded the Global Economic Governance Programme at Oxford University, an interdisciplinary research program dedicated to improving the governance of international organizations and economic policy-making.

She also co-founded the Oxford–Princeton Global Leaders Fellowship program (together with Professor Robert O. Keohane of Princeton University), which supports scholars and practitioners from around the world in the field of global governance.

Woods led the conception and development of the Blavatnik School of Government and was appointed its inaugural Dean in 2011. The Blavatnik School is Oxford's school of public policy. As the founding dean, Woods oversaw the school’s launch, curriculum development, and the construction of its award-winning Oxford campus. Under her leadership, the school developed into a globally recognized institution for government and public policy education. As of 2026, Woods continues to serve as Dean.

In addition to her dean role, Ngaire Woods holds the position of Professor of Global Economic Governance at Oxford University.

She has been a faculty member in Oxford's Department of Politics and International Relations and a Senior Research Fellow of University College.

In early 2021, Woods was appointed by the G20 to the High Level Independent Panel (HLIP) on financing the global commons for pandemic preparedness and response, co-chaired by Ngozi Okonjo-Iweala, Tharman Shanmugaratnam and Lawrence Summers.

At Oxford she founded the Global Economic Governance Programme (currently directed by Emily Jones) and is the co-founder (with Robert Keohane) of the Oxford–Princeton Global Leaders Fellowship programme.

She is a Fellow of the Academy of Social Sciences and an International Honorary Member of the American Academy of Arts and Sciences, and an Honorary Fellow of the Royal Academy of Arts.

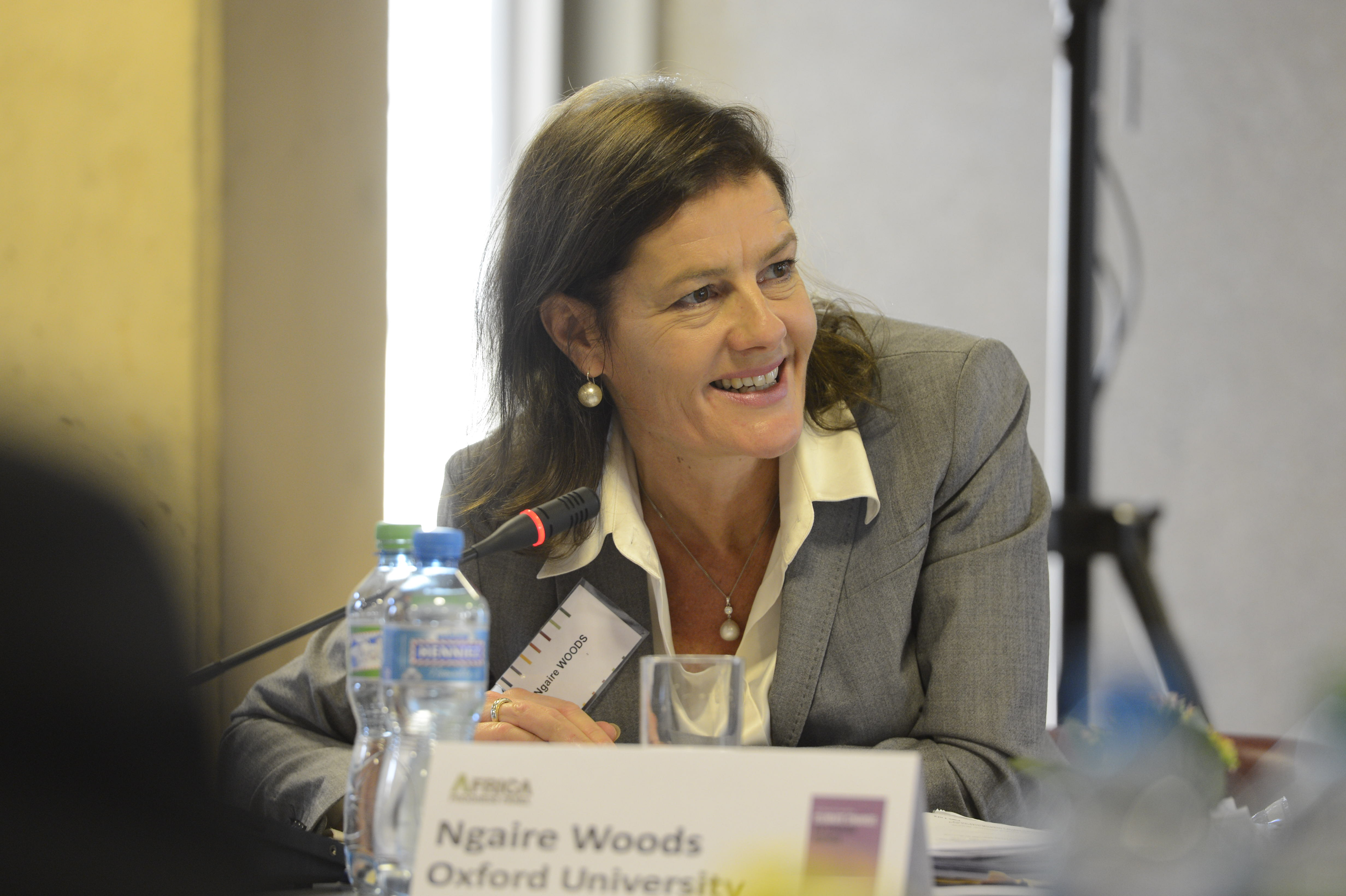
Woods at a meeting in 2014

== Research and publications ==
Her research focuses on global economic governance, the challenges of globalization, global development, and the role of international institutions.

Woods' academic contributions include analyses of how international institutions can become more effective and accountable. Her 2006 book The Globalizers: The IMF, the World Bank and Their Borrowers examined the relationship between those financial institutions and the countries they lend to, shedding light on how power dynamics and borrowing conditions affected outcomes.

She has also co-authored works like The Politics of Global Regulation (in 2009 with Walter Mattli) and Networks of Influence? Developing Countries in a Networked Global Order (2009), which explore how international rules are made and how networks of states and non-state actors shape global standards.

Since 2013, Woods has written monthly commentaries on economic and regulatory policy for Project Syndicate, an international media organization.

== Personal life ==
Woods is married to the American-born, University of Oxford professor Eugene Rogan. They have two children.

== Other activities ==
Woods has served as an advisor to the IMF board, to the UNDP Human Development Report, and to the Commonwealth Heads of Government. She is a former regular presenter of the Analysis programme for BBC Radio 4, and in 1998 presented her own BBC television series on public policy. She has also served as a member of the IMF European Regional Advisory Group.

As a Rhodes Scholar alumna she is today a Trustee of the Rhodes Trust, the organization overseeing the Rhodes Scholarships.

=== Corporate boards ===
- Arup, non-executive member of the board of directors
- Rio Tinto, independent non-executive director

=== Non-profit organizations ===
- Asian Infrastructure Investment Bank (AIIB), member of the international advisory panel
- Berggruen Institute, member of the board of directors
- Mo Ibrahim Foundation, member of the board
- Oxonia, member of the academic and policy board
- Ditchley Foundation, member of the board of governors
- Rhodes Trust, member of the board of trustees (since 2009)
- Center for Global Development, member of the advisory group
- Center for International Governance Innovation, member of the board
- Europaeum, member of the board of trustees
- World Economic Forum (WEF), co-chair of the Global Future Council on Technology, Values and Policy
- Trilateral Commission, member of the European Group

== Books ==
- Woods, N. The Globalizers: the IMF, the World Bank, and their Borrowers, Cornell University Press, March 2006; ISBN 0-8014-4424-1
- Woods, N. The Political Economy of Globalization, Macmillan, 2000
- Woods, N. "Exporting Good Governance: Temptations and Challenges in Canada's Aid Program" (with Jennifer Welsh, Laurier University Press, 2007)
- Woods, N. "Making Self-Regulation Effective in Developing Countries" (with Dana Brown, Oxford University Press, 2007)
- Woods, N. (Editor) Explaining International Relations since 1945, Oxford University Press, 1996; ISBN 0-19-874196-0
- Woods, N. (Co-Author) Inequality, Globalization, and World Politics, Oxford University Press, 1999; ISBN 0-19-829567-7
- Mattli, W and Woods, N (Co-Author) The Politics of Global Regulation, Princeton University Press March 2009; ISBN 0-691-13961-X
