= Clarendon Institute =

Building in Walton Street, central Oxford, England

The Clarendon Institute (or the Clarendon Press Institute) is a building in Walton Street, central Oxford, England.

In 1891, Horace Hart (1840–1916) of the Clarendon Press (now Oxford University Press) proposed an institute to provide a place providing relaxation and further education facilities for staff at the Press. He planned a gymnasium, library, and reading room, and to provide teaching of French, German, Greek, Latin, mathematics, and shorthand.

The building was designed by H. W. Moore and built during 1892–93. It cost £5,000 to build.

The Clarendon Institute now houses the Oxford Centre for Hebrew and Jewish Studies, (an independent centre of the University of Oxford), the British Inter-University China Centre, the Centre for Linguistics & Philology, and the Leopold Muller Memorial Library.

In 2016, the building suffered a fire.
