= Walter Mattli =

Political scientist and academic

- Born: Lucerne, Switzerland
- Occupation: Political Scientist

Walter Mattli is a supernumerary fellow at St. John's College of the University of Oxford, England. He served as fellow in politics at St. John's College and professor of international political economy in the Department of Politics and International Relations at Oxford. Mattli was a senior member of the Oxford International Relations Society.

== Background ==
Walter Mattli was born in Lucerne, Switzerland. He received his undergraduate degree from the University of Geneva (Switzerland) and his Ph.D. from the University of Chicago (US). Before beginning his graduate studies, he worked in international banking. From 1995 until 2004 he taught at Columbia University in New York, where he was associate professor of international political economy and a member of the Institute of War and Peace Studies.

In 1995, Walter Mattli was awarded the Helen Dwight Reid Award of the American Political Science Association, in 2003 the JP Morgan International Prize in Finance Policy and Economics of the American Academy in Berlin, and in 2006 a two-year British Academy Research Fellowship. In 2012, he was appointed co-editor of the journal Regulation and Governance. He serves also as editor (with Liesbeth Hooghe and Gary Marks) of a new book series with Oxford University Press titled Transformations in Governance. He is the winner (with Alex Stone Sweet of Yale Law School) of the open competition for the editorship of the 50th anniversary special issues of the Journal of Common Market Studies published in March 2012. In 2015 Walter Mattli was awarded a British Academy/Leverhulme Trust Senior Research Fellowship.

Professor Mattli's publications include The Logic of Regional Integration: Europe and Beyond (Cambridge University Press, 1999), The Politics of Global Regulation (Princeton University Press, 2009, with Ngaire Woods, eds), The New Global Rulers: the Privatization of Regulation in the World Economy (Princeton University Press, March 2011, with Tim Buthe), winner of the 2012 Best Book Award of the International Studies Association ISA, Institutional Choice and Global Commerce (Cambridge University Press, 2013, with Joseph Jupille and Duncan Snidal), International Arbitration and Global Governance: Contending Theories and Evidence (Oxford University Press, 2014, with Thomas Dietz, eds), Global Algorithmic Capital Markets: High Frequency Trading, Dark Pools, and Regulatory Challenges (Oxford University Press, 2018, ed.), Darkness By Design (Princeton University Press, 2019); as well as articles on European legal integration, EU enlargement, comparative regional integration, international commercial dispute resolution, transatlantic regulatory cooperation, and globalization and international governance. Walter Mattli highly specializes in research and publications on issues of global economic governance.
