= Walton Street, Oxford =

Street in central Oxford, England

Coordinates: 51°45′32″N 1°15′51″W

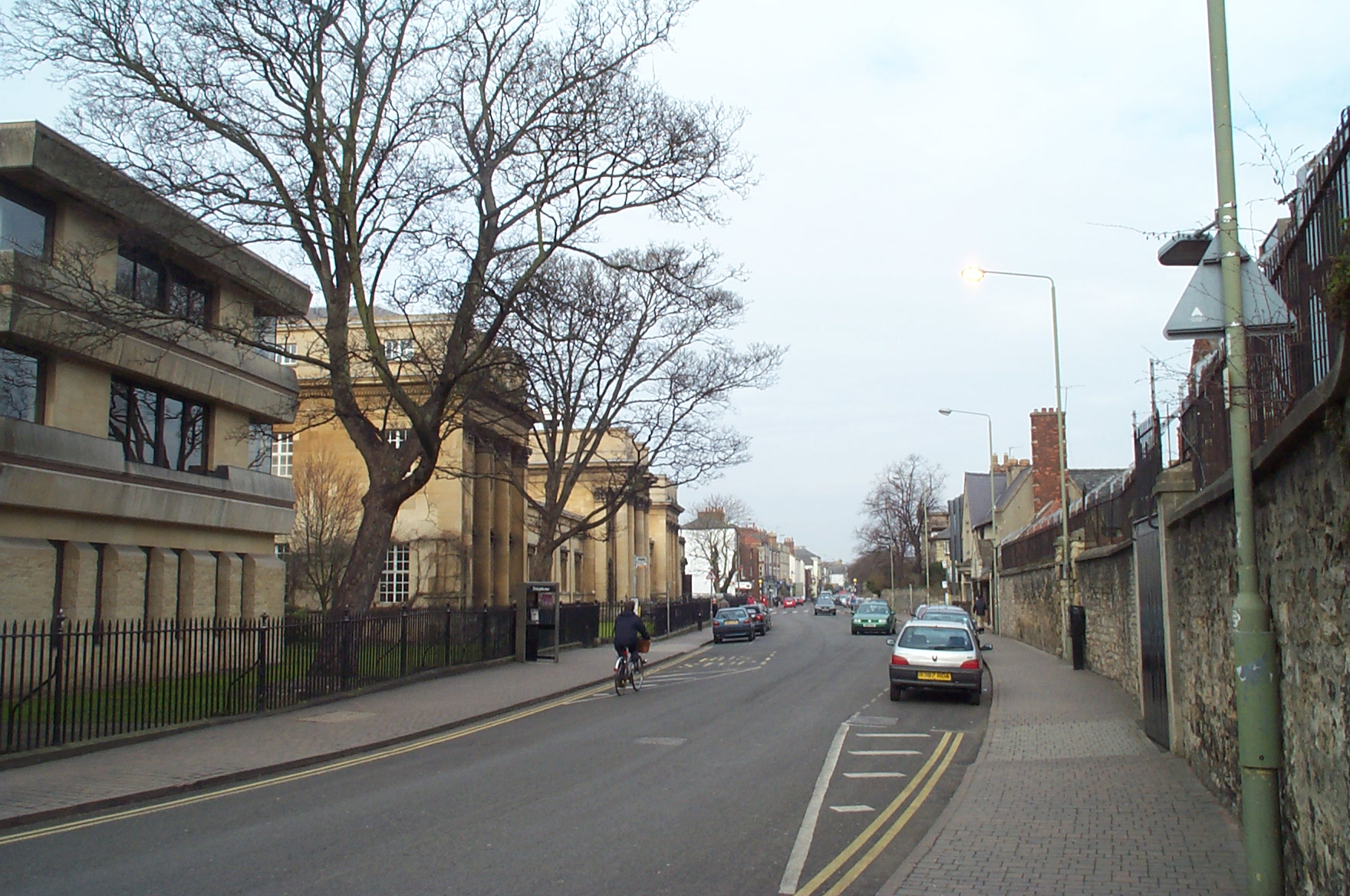
Looking north along Walton Street with the Oxford University Press on the left and Somerville College on the right hand side.

Location of Walton Street in Oxford

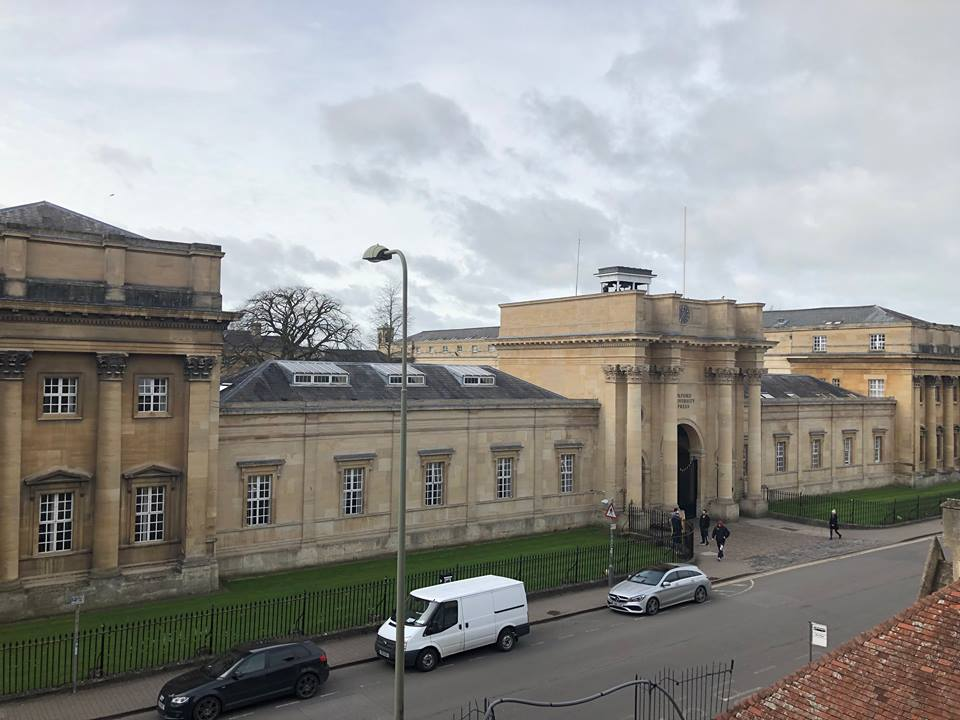
Oxford University Press building on Walton Street from Somerville College.

Walton Street is on the eastern edge of the Jericho district of central Oxford, England.v The street runs north from the western end of Beaumont Street and the northern end of Worcester Street by the main entrance of Worcester College. Northwards, the street continues as Kingston Road through Walton Manor, at a junction with Walton Well Road to the northwest towards Port Meadow and St Bernard's Road to the east, linking with Woodstock Road. Near the northern end of Walton Street, Observatory Street also links Woodstock Road to the east.

== Buildings and institutions ==
The Clarendon Institute building, which houses the Oxford Centre for Hebrew and Jewish Studies, is on the east side of the street. Somerville College, one of the former women-only colleges, also backs onto the street. The Oxford University Press (just south of the junction with Great Clarendon Street) and the original location of Ruskin College are on the west side of the street, the former Church of England parish church of Saint Paul on the east side is almost opposite the OUP and St Sepulchre's Cemetery is off the street to the west.

The Oxford University Press is a neoclassical building erected 1826–30. The central part was designed by Daniel Robertson and the north and west wings by Edward Blore. Modern extensions were added in 1960–61 and early in the 1970s.

The Freud café-bar stands opposite the Oxford University Press, and at the head of Great Clarendon Street. The bar, which was opened in 1988, is housed in a grand neoclassical building with an Ionic portico. This building was constructed as the Church of St Paul, the first Anglican parish church to be constructed in Oxford after the Reformation. The new church and parish was created to serve the growing community of Jericho. The building was designed by the architect H. J. Underwood and built in 1836. The architect E. G. Bruton added the apse in 1853 and F. C. Eden remodelled the interior in 1908. In the 20th century St Paul's became a redundant church and, after deconsecration, became a theatre and arts centre. In 1988 the building was acquired by Secession Ltd. to prevent its demolition and opened as Freud café-bar.

The Jericho Tavern is a public house and music venue at 56 Walton Street. In the late 1980s and early 1990s it was an important part of the music scene in Oxford, spawning the groups Ride, Radiohead and Supergrass.

The central part of Walton Street has changed significantly as more areas are developed by the University of Oxford. The former Radcliffe Infirmary site on the east side will become the Radcliffe Observatory Quarter, a large campus for humanities research and administration. The long wall separating the Infirmary from the street has been punctuated by a new pedestrian route to Woodstock Road and a health centre.

In 2015, a new controversial building for the Blavatnik School of Government of Oxford University on the Radcliffe Observatory Quarter site, designed by Herzog & de Meuron, was opened immediately opposite the Oxford University Press building, dominating the location with its height (taller than Carfax Tower), and resulting in further removal of the high stone wall behind the old Infirmary site. Exeter College has developed the former Ruskin College site opposite to the south for college accommodation as its Cohen Quad.

== Commercial venues ==
Little Clarendon Street, a shopping street, links Walton Street with Saint Giles. There are numerous restaurants on Walton Street, often used by Oxford University students because of its central position, such as Branca, Loch Fyne, The Jericho Cafe, Arzoo, Brasserie Blanc (associated with the chef Raymond Blanc) and The Standard Tandoori. Oxford's main independent art house cinema, the Phoenix Picturehouse, is on the west side of the street. A number of cocktail bars and pubs can be found on Walton Street.

Other shops include the speciality florist Daisies and Branca Delicatessen.

Northwards the street continues as Kingston Road through Walton Manor, at a junction with Walton Well Road to the northwest towards Port Meadow and St Bernard's Road to the east, linking with Woodstock Road. Near the northern end of Walton Street, Observatory Street also links Woodstock Road to the east.

== Notable residents ==
- Sir Percy Alden, social worker, land reformer, and radical Liberal Party politician, was born at 16 Walton Street in 1865 and grew up there
- Edwin Ardener, social anthropologist and academic, lived at 73 Walton Street until his death in 1987
- Beatrice Blackwood, anthropologist and museum curator, lived at 45 Walton Street from 1930 to 1962
- Thomas Combe, printer, publisher, and patron of the arts, lived at North House, Oxford University Press, Walton Street with his wife Martha Combe from 1833 until his death in 1872
- Charles John ffoulkes, historian and curator of the Royal Armouries at London, lived at 142 Walton Street until his death in 1947
- Philippa Foot, philosopher, lived at 15 Walton Street from 1972 until her death in 2010, and is commemorated by an Oxfordshire Blue Plaque on the house.
- Francis Haskell, art historian, lived at 7 Walton Street until his death in 2000
- Christopher Hawkes, archaeologist, lived at 19 Walton Street until his death in 1992
- P. D. James, crime novelist, was born at The Cottage, 164 Walton Street in 1920
- Enid Starkie, literary critic, lived at 23 Walton Street until her death in 1970

== Gallery ==
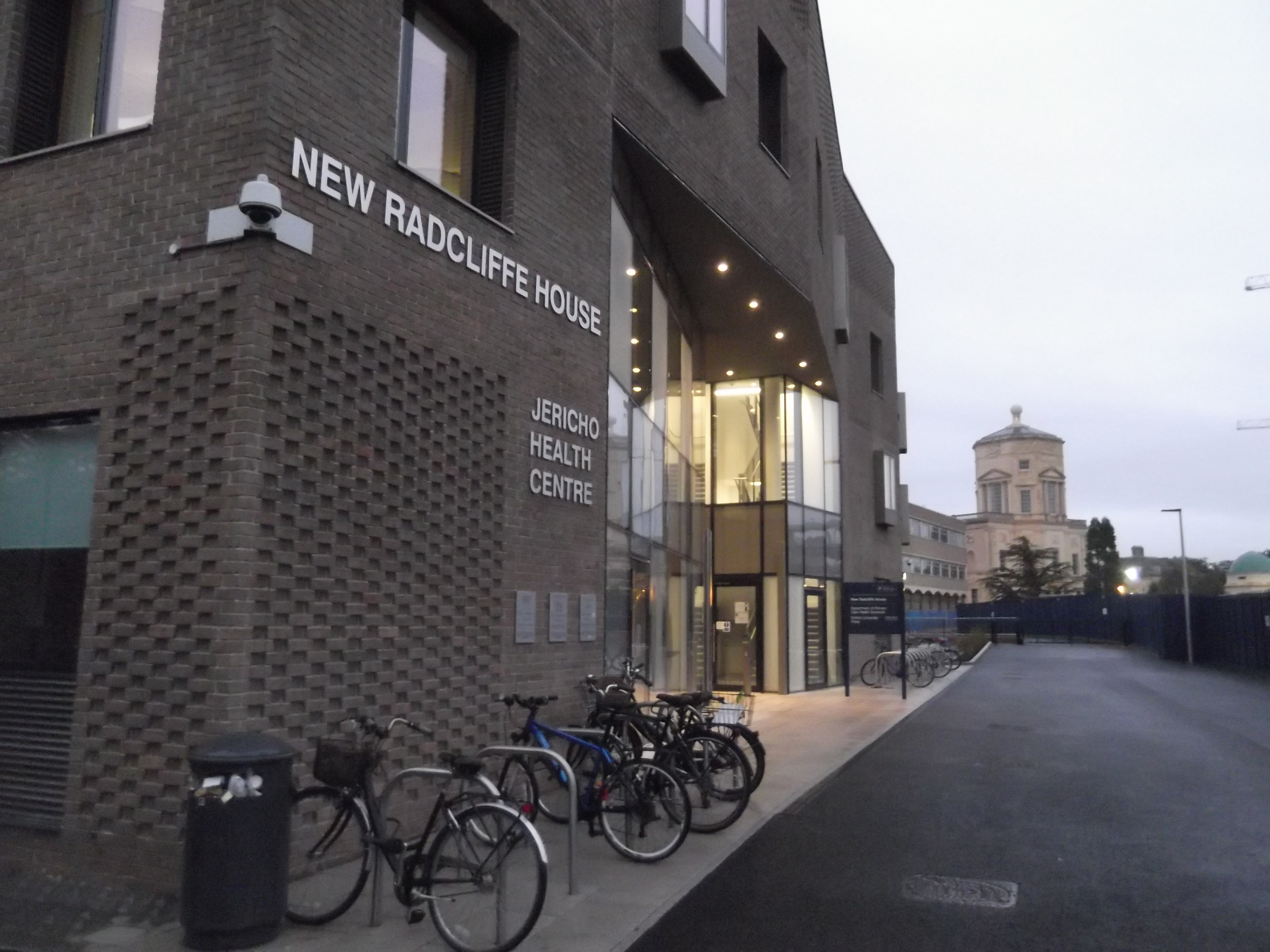
New Radcliffe House in the Radcliffe Observatory Quarter off Walton Street, completed in 2012 and housing the Jericho Health Centre, with the tower of the Radcliffe Observatory in the background.

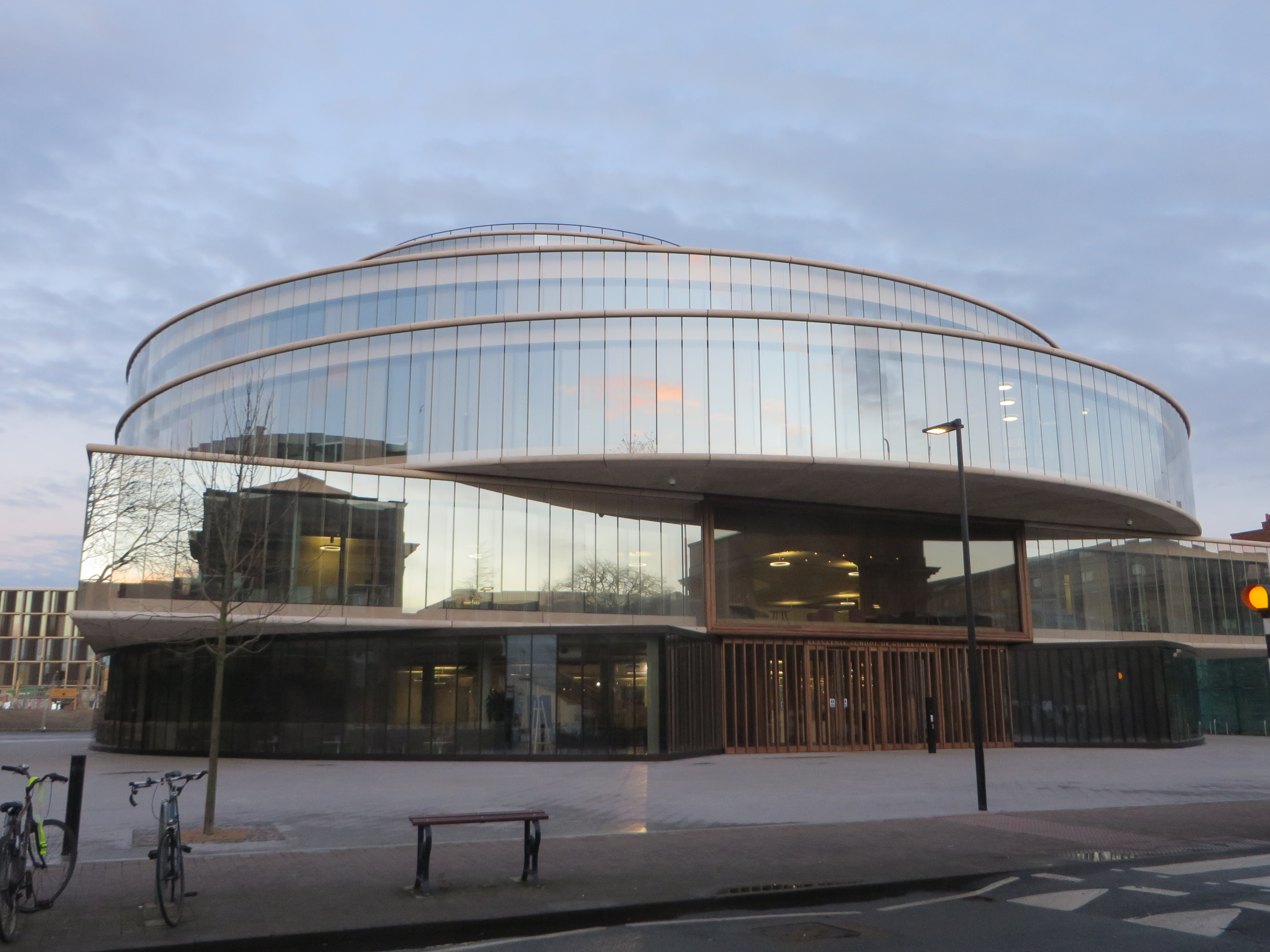
The 2015 Blavatnik School of Government building by Herzog & de Meuron on Walton Street, opposite the Oxford University Press building and next to Somerville College.

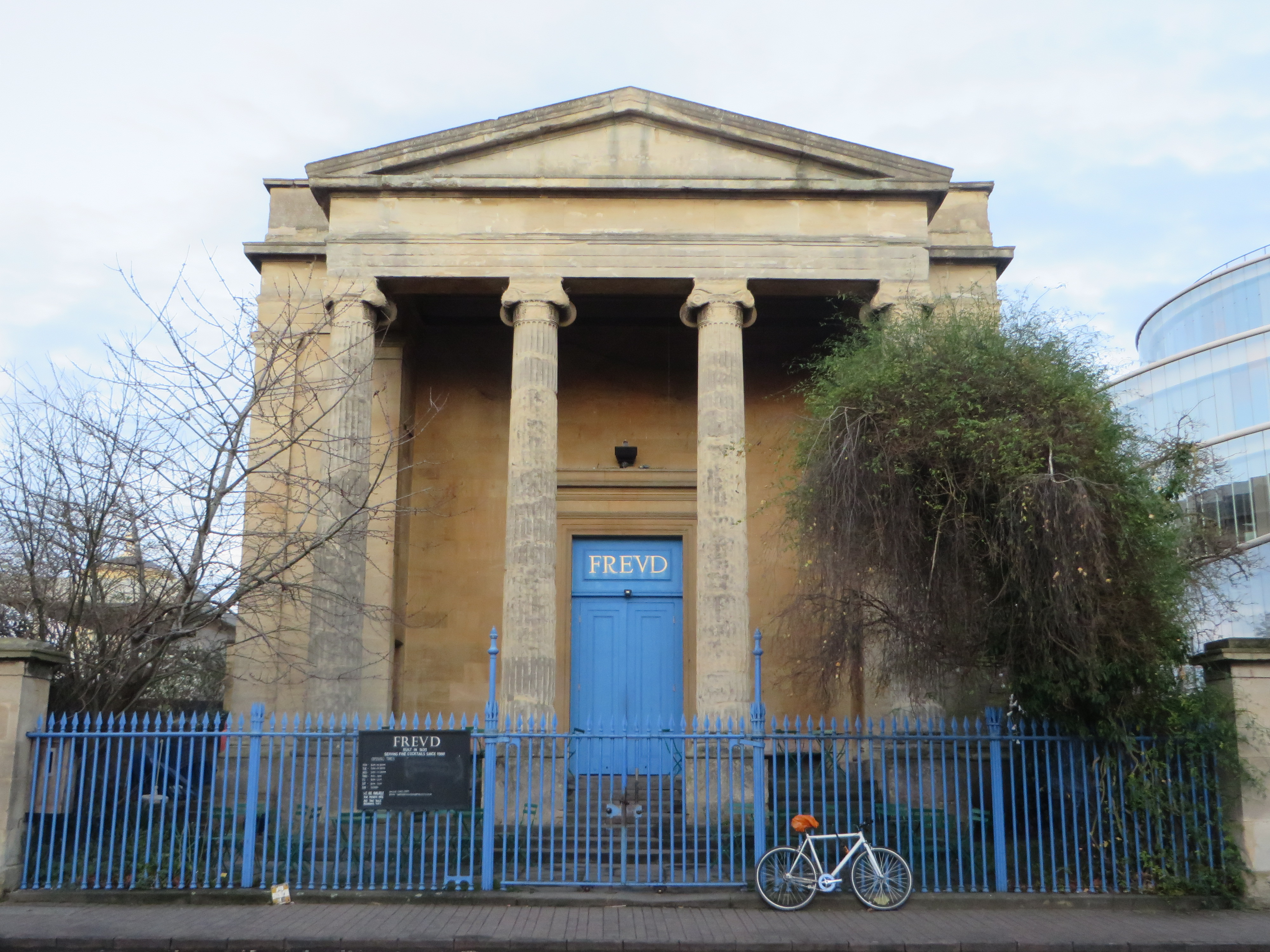
The Freud cafe-bar on Walton Street, in the former St Paul's church building, opposite the junction with Great Clarendon Street and next to the Blavatnik School of Government.

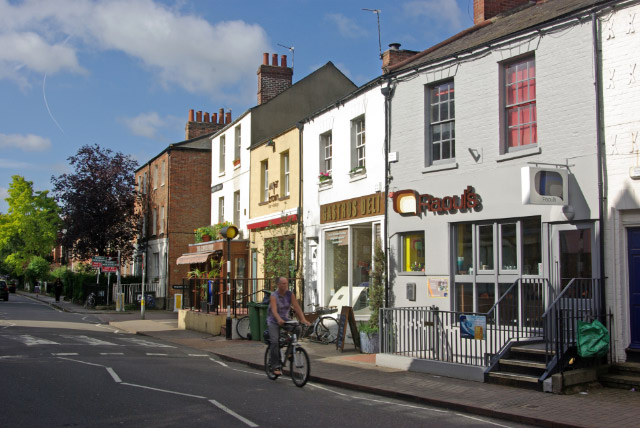
Shops on Walton Street near Walton Crescent in Jericho.

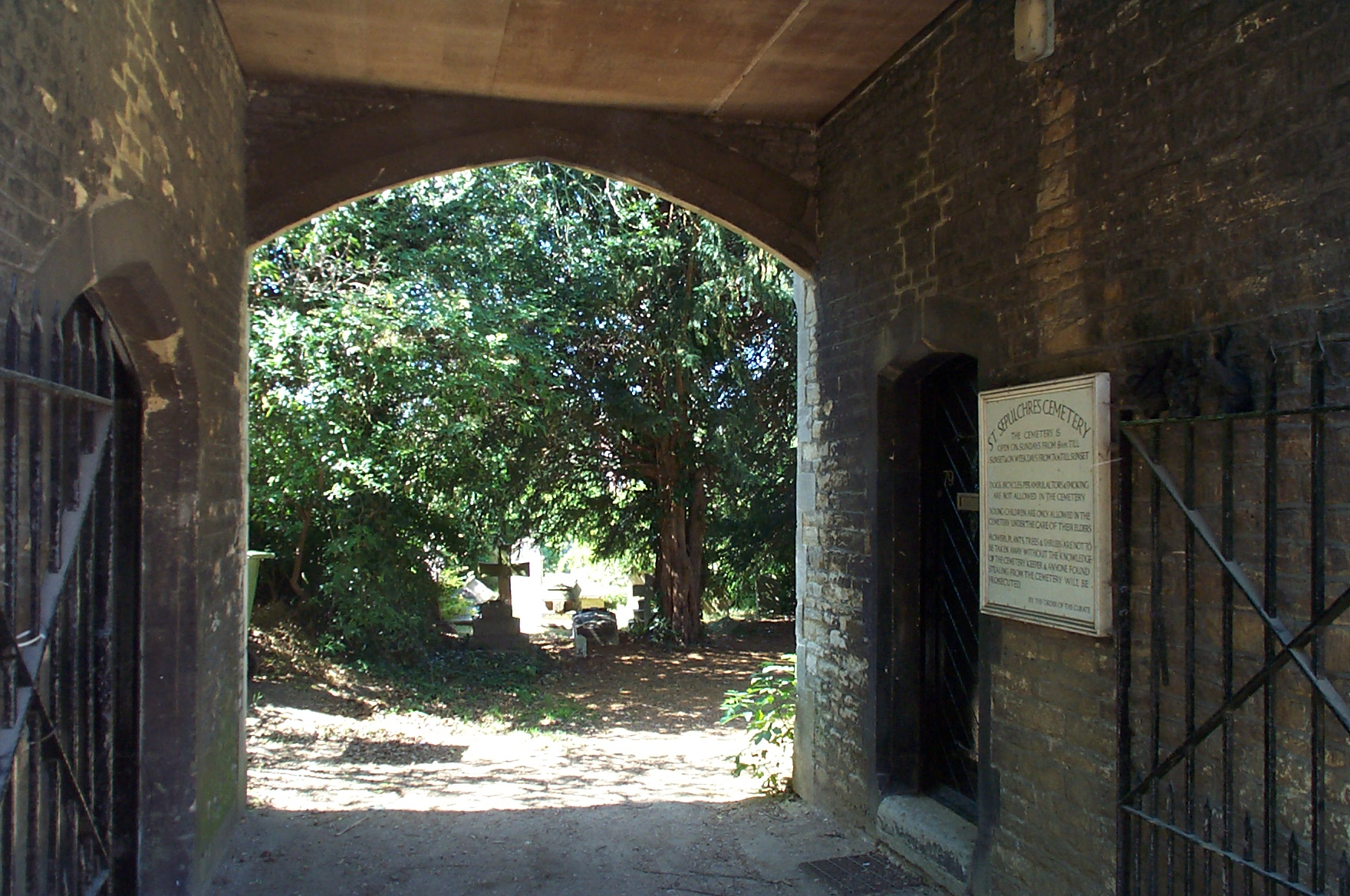
The entrance to St Sepulchre's Cemetery, off Walton Street.

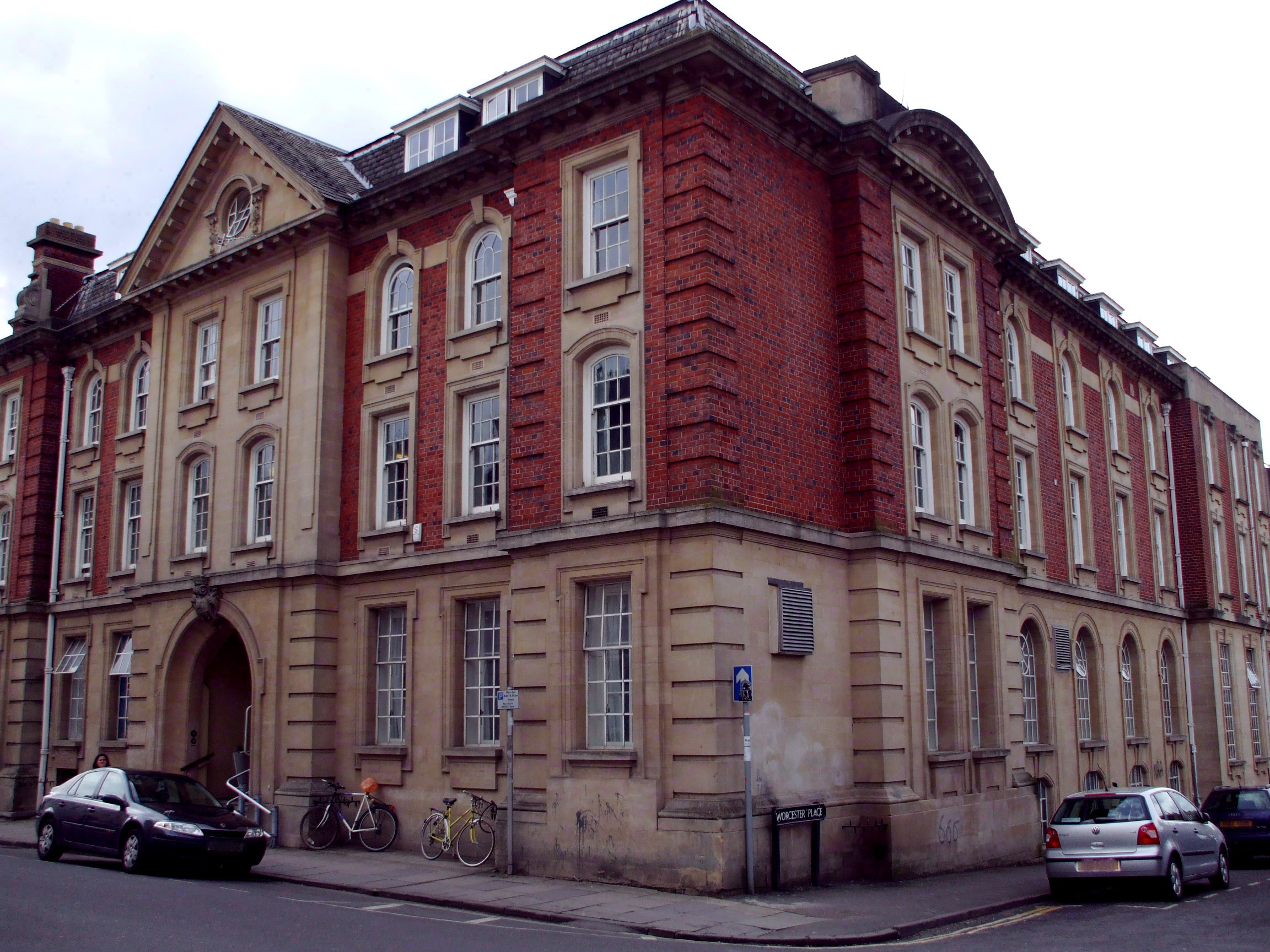
The former Ruskin College in Walton Street.

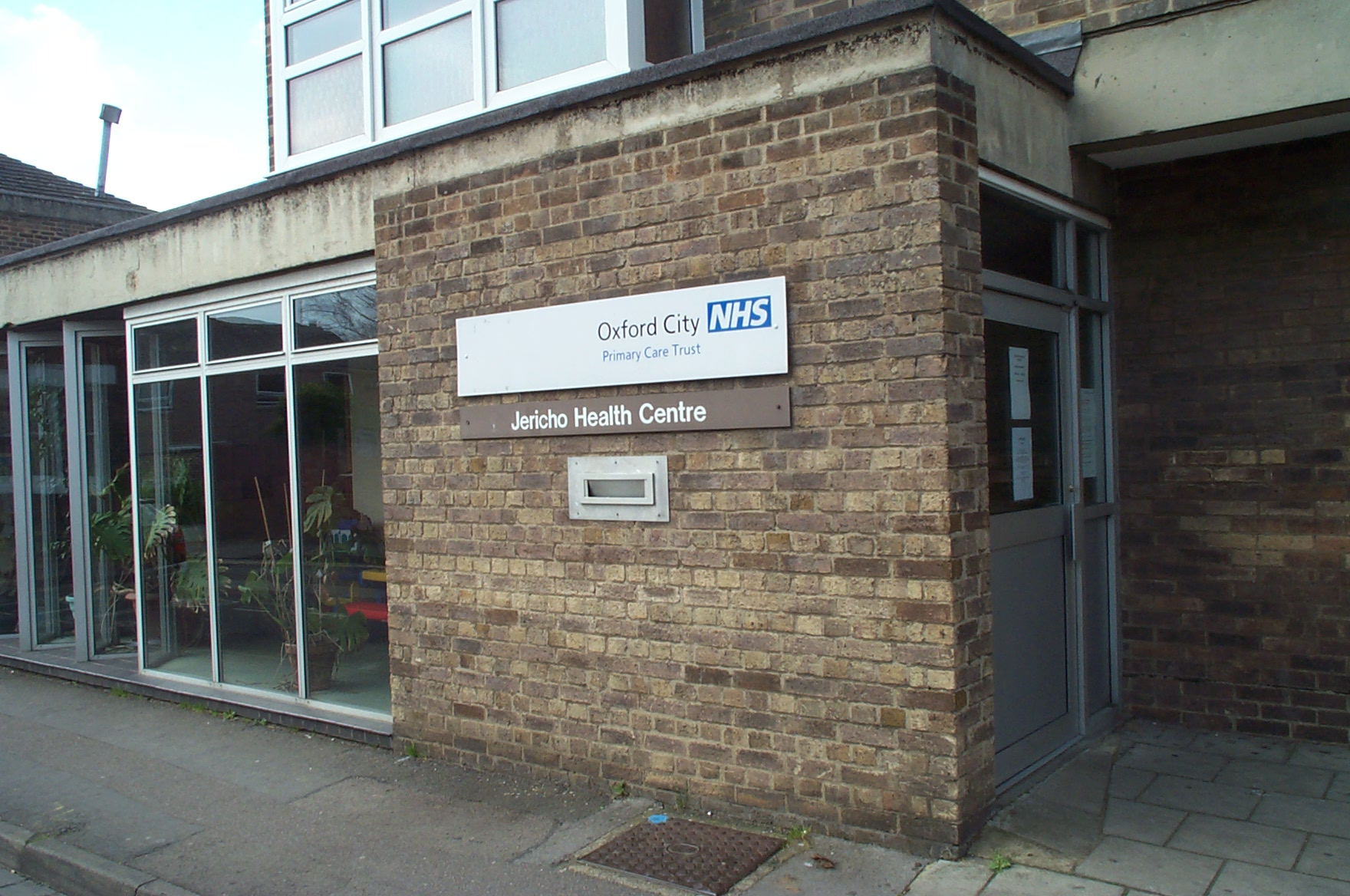
The former Jericho Health Centre building in Walton Street.

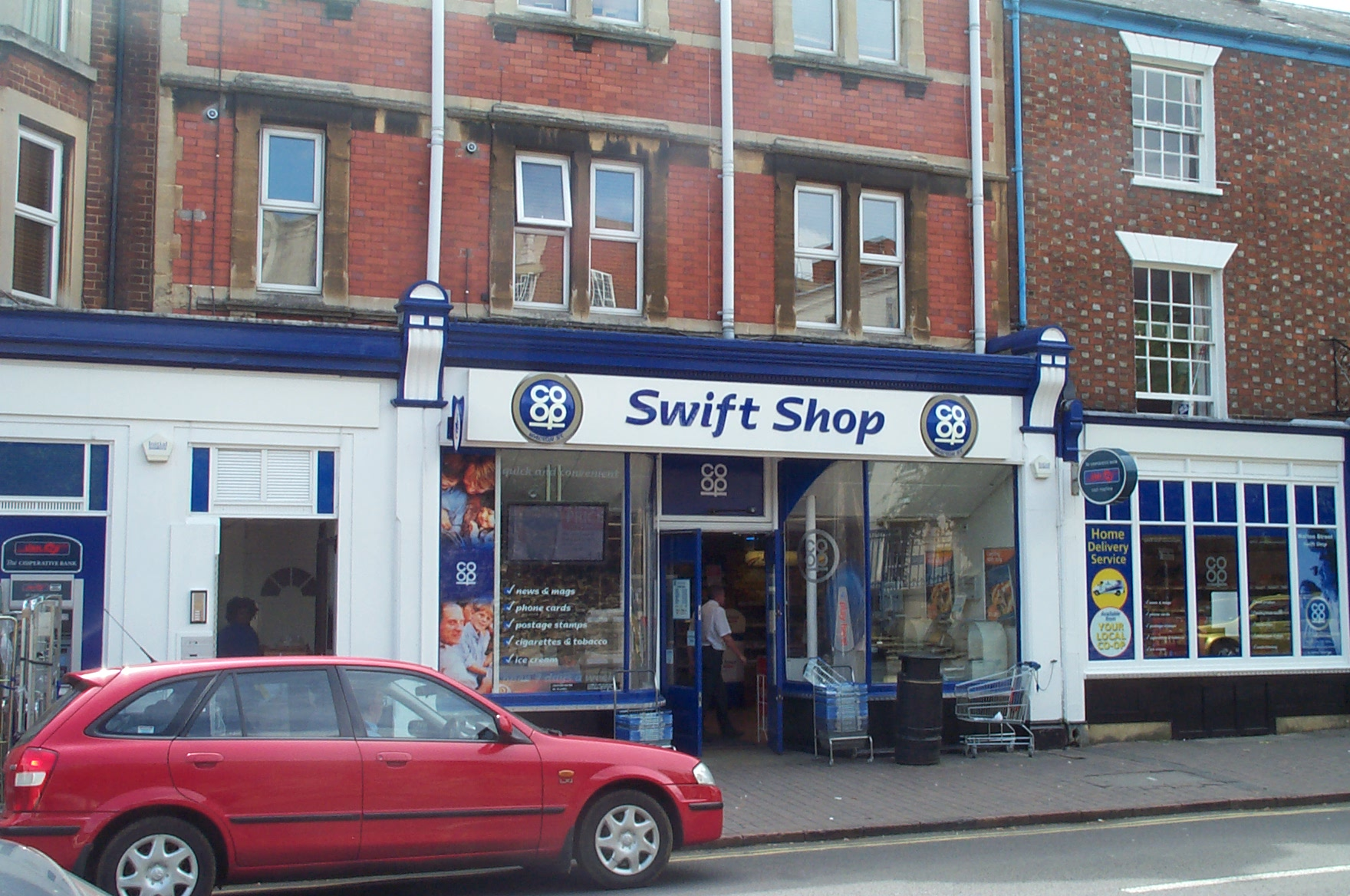
Midcounties Co-operative “Swift Shop” in Walton Street.

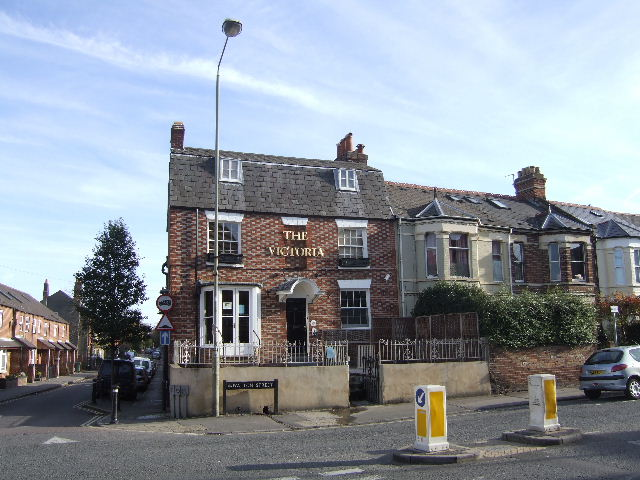
The Victoria public house on the corner of the north end of Walton Street and St Bernard's Road (left).

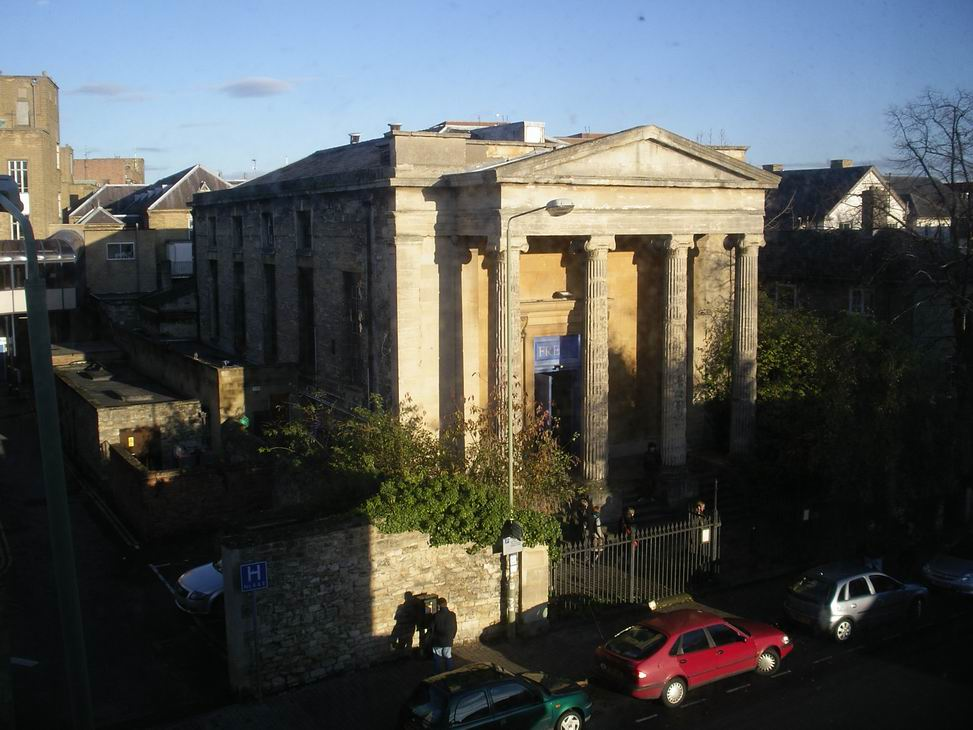
Freud café/bar at 119 Walton Street, in a former Greek Revival church dating from 1836.

== Adjoining streets ==
- Beaumont Street
- Great Clarendon Street
- Juxon Street
- Kingston Road
- Little Clarendon Street
- Observatory Street
- St Bernard's Road
- Walton Well Road
- Worcester Street

== Sources and further reading ==
- Chance, Eleanor & Christina Colvin, Janet Cooper, C. J. Day, T. G. Hassall, Mary Jessup & Nesta Selwyn (1979). Crossley, Alan; Elrington, C. R. (eds.). Victoria County History: A History of the County of Oxford: Volume 4. Institute of Historical Research.
- Sherwood, Jennifer; Pevsner, Nikolaus (1974). The Buildings of England: Oxfordshire. Harmondsworth: Penguin Books. ISBN 0-14-071045-0.
- Tyack, Geoffrey (1998). Oxford An Architectural Guide. Oxford & New York: Oxford University Press. ISBN 0-19-817423-3.
