= Little Clarendon Street =

Street in Oxford, England

Coordinates: 51.7584°N 1.2622°W

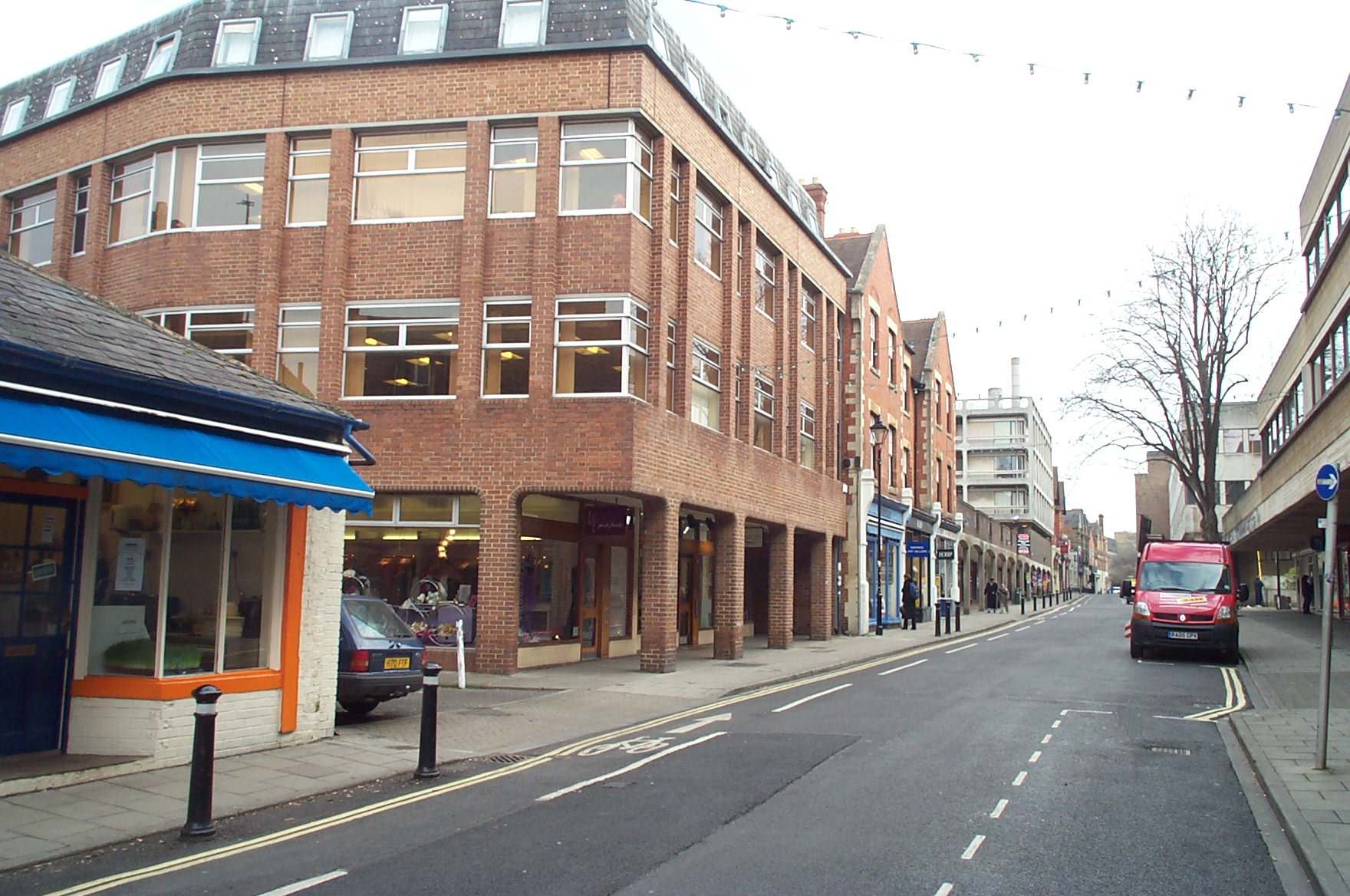
Little Clarendon Street looking east (2006).

Location of Little Clarendon Street in Oxford

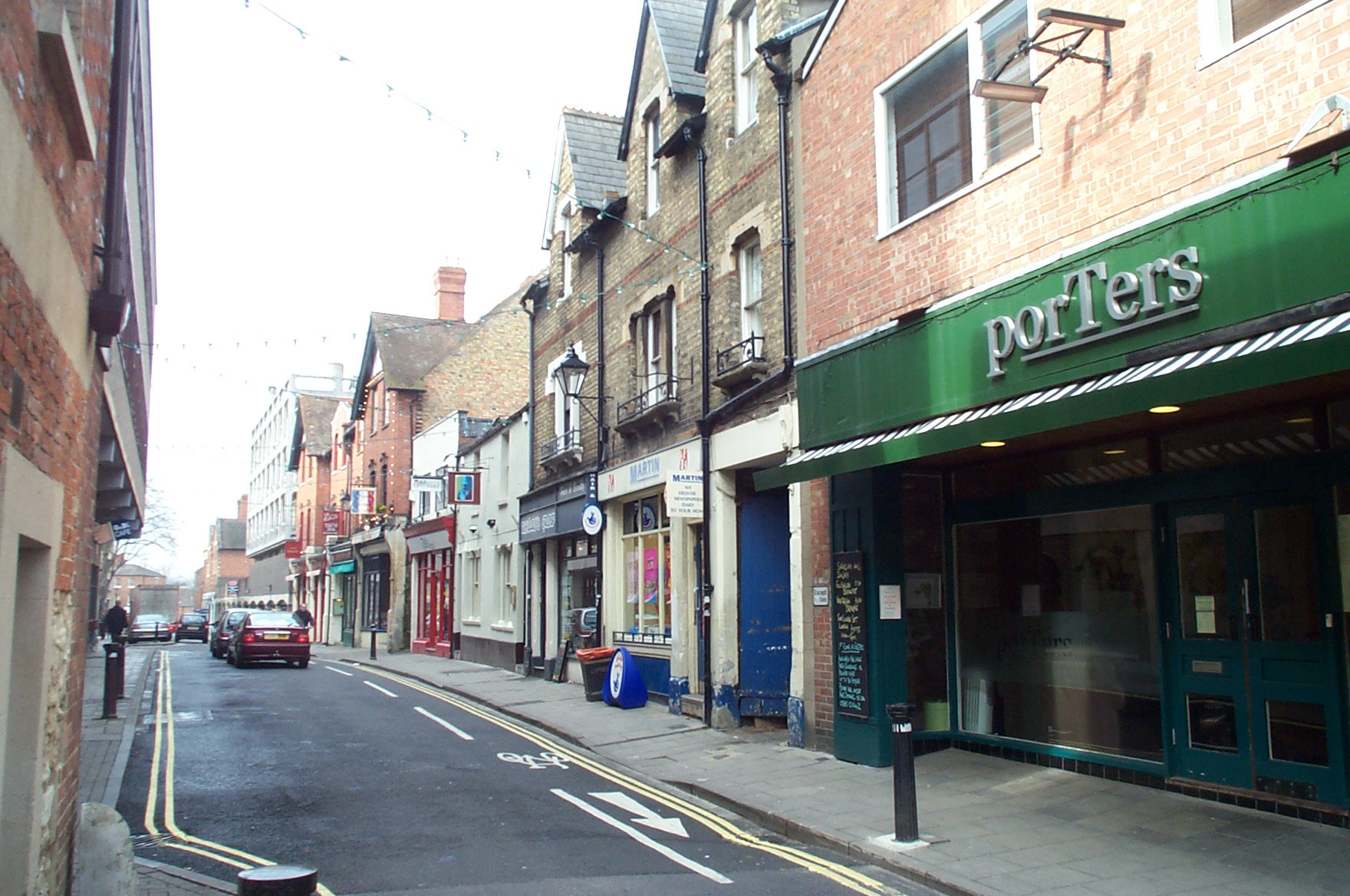
Little Clarendon Street looking west. Porters restaurant was replaced by a chain-restaurant Carluccio's, which has since closed.

Little Clarendon Street is a short shopping street in northwest Oxford, England. It runs east-west between the south end of Woodstock Road opposite St Giles' Church to the east, Somerville College to the north and Walton Street to the west. One of the three principal streets in North Oxford off the Woodstock Road, the shops and cafés located there are considered bohemian; the other two streets are North Parade and South Parade. Occasionally nicknamed Little Trendy Street, its reputation was already apparent in the 1960s.

== Buildings ==
As of 2026, the following buildings can be found on the street (this list is not definitive):

North side (east to west)

- Taylor's Delicatessen (previously Lloyds Pharmacy (with Post Office; closed January 2009)
- Lussmanns restaurant - closed March 2020 (previously Carluccio's restaurant - closed January 2020, and before that Strada Italian restaurant, Porter's, and numerous previous incarnations)
- Tree Artisan Cafe (previously, Elham's Lebanese Deli - closed 2018, the Oxford Pantry - closed 2014, and Martin's newsagent);
- Oxford Wine Company wine and spirit merchant (previously Oddbins);
- Richards' Group hairdresser's;
- Duke of Cambridge cocktail bar;
- The Oxford Wine Company;
- Pierre Victoire Restaurant;
- Al-Andalus Tapas Bar;
- Wilding Wine Bar (formerly Café Rouge Restaurant - closed 2021);
- Margery Fry & Elizabeth Nuffield House, part of the graduate-student accommodation of Somerville College;
- Uense - closed 2022 (previously Demijohn – The Liquid Deli - closed 2018; and Sylvester's Art and Gifts - closed 2013);
- Gail's Bakery (previously Mumu Cafe and Oxford City Barbers - both closed down 2016)
- Moshi Oxford (previous Run Oxford, closed 2009)
- Popham Hairdressing (previously Walton and Giles hairdresser - closed 2017, and Dominique - closed 2014)
- Natural Bread Company (baker's and café)
- Jericho Cheese Company (previously Uncle Sam's Vintage American Clothing store, closed 2014);
- Hobbs Clothing Store;
- Wild Honey (previously Nourish Oxford - closed 2021, Ellie Sanderson - closed 2018);
- Clements & Church;
- Lacy's hair salon;
- Posh Frocks clothing store;
- Juice sandwich shop;
- Oxford Wine Cafe (on corner with Walton Street).

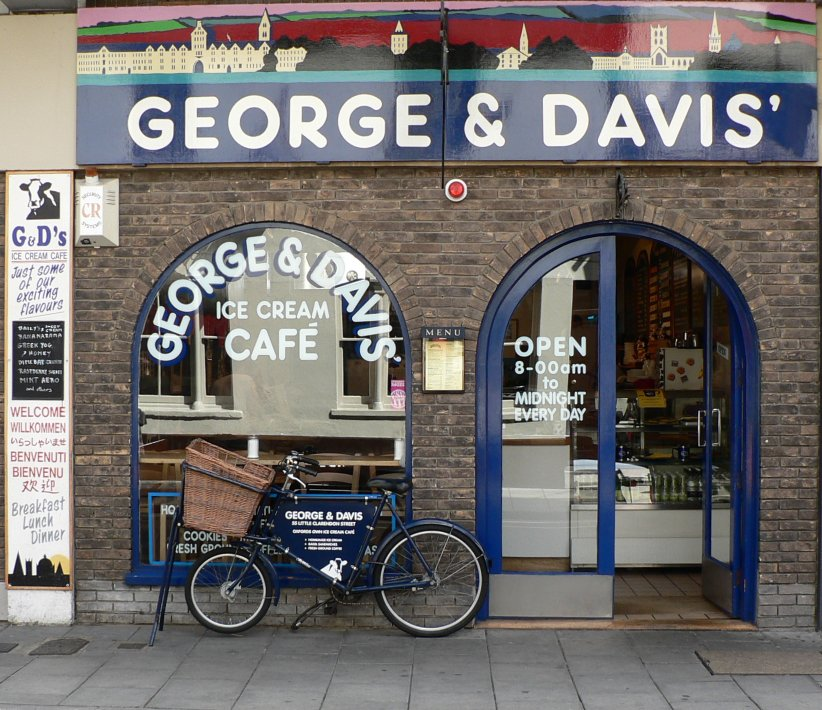
George and Davis' Ice Cream Café on Little Clarendon Street.

South side (east to west)

- Taylor's Delicatessen
- University of Oxford IT Services, Dartington House
- University of Oxford Admissions Office;
- G&D's Ice Cream Cafe;
- Angels cocktail bar;
- Sobell House Hospice Charity Shop;
- The Isis Centre (counselling centre run by Oxfordshire & Buckinghamshire Mental Health NHS Partnership Trust);
- The University of Oxford Offices;
- Oxford Little Barbers (previously Mortons Cafe; closed 2017);
- Common Ground collaborative workspace (previously Barclays Bank - closed 2014);
- Lizzie James women's clothing store;
- Central furniture store.

Along its south side the most prominent building is the 1960s University Central Offices, which in the minds of many people is an eyesore that damaged the character of the otherwise stately Wellington Square.

The Porters Bar & Restaurant, formerly at 1–2 Little Clarendon Street, but frequently changing hands, and now occupied by Carluccio's, appeared in the BBC television programme The Restaurant.

On the wall of Taylor's Delicatessen on the south-side of Little Clarendon Street, a miniature model door and window have been installed by Cambridge-based art project Dinky Doors.

== See also ==
- Great Clarendon Street, in the nearby Jericho district
