= G&D's =

Ice cream shop chain in Oxford, England

Coordinates: 51.75864°N 1.26141°W

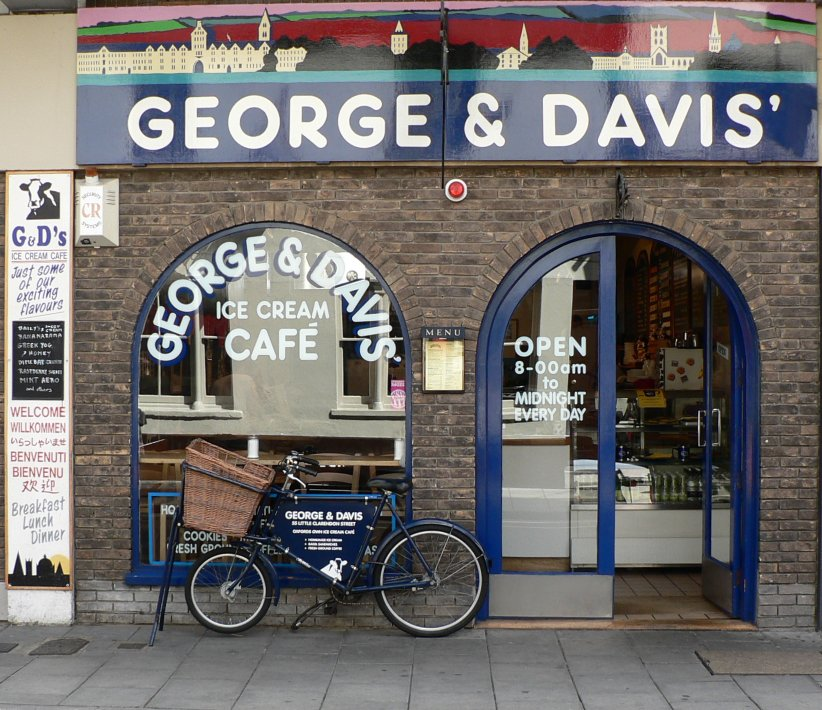
George and Davis' on Little Clarendon Street

G&D's. is an ice cream parlour chain in Oxford, England. It operates several branches with separate names, George and Davis', George and Danver, and George and Delila.

== History ==
G&D's was founded in 1992 by two Oxford students, George Stroup and Davis Roberts, who gave their names to the original café in Little Clarendon Street.

G&D's opened a second branch, George and Danver, on the corner of St. Aldates and Pembroke Street in 2001, which make a daily selection of baked goods. Both ice-cream and bakery items are cycled from shop to shop with "ice-cream bikes."

In 2007 a third shop, George and Delila, was opened on Cowley Road. It has become a venue for music events and informal concerts.
