= Edward George Bruton =

British architect (1826–1899)

- Born: 17 February 1826
- Died: 3 August 1899
- Occupation: Architect

Edward George Bruton (17 February 1826 – 3 August 1899) was a British Gothic Revival architect who practised in Oxford. He was made an Associate of the Royal Institute of British Architects (RIBA) in 1855 and a Fellow of the RIBA in 1861.

Born in Holywell, Oxford in 1826, the son of Richard Bruton, the Common Room Man at New College, and his wife Ruth, he was apprenticed to the architect John Plowman by the time of the 1841 census.

He is buried in St Sepulchre's Cemetery, Oxford.

== Work ==
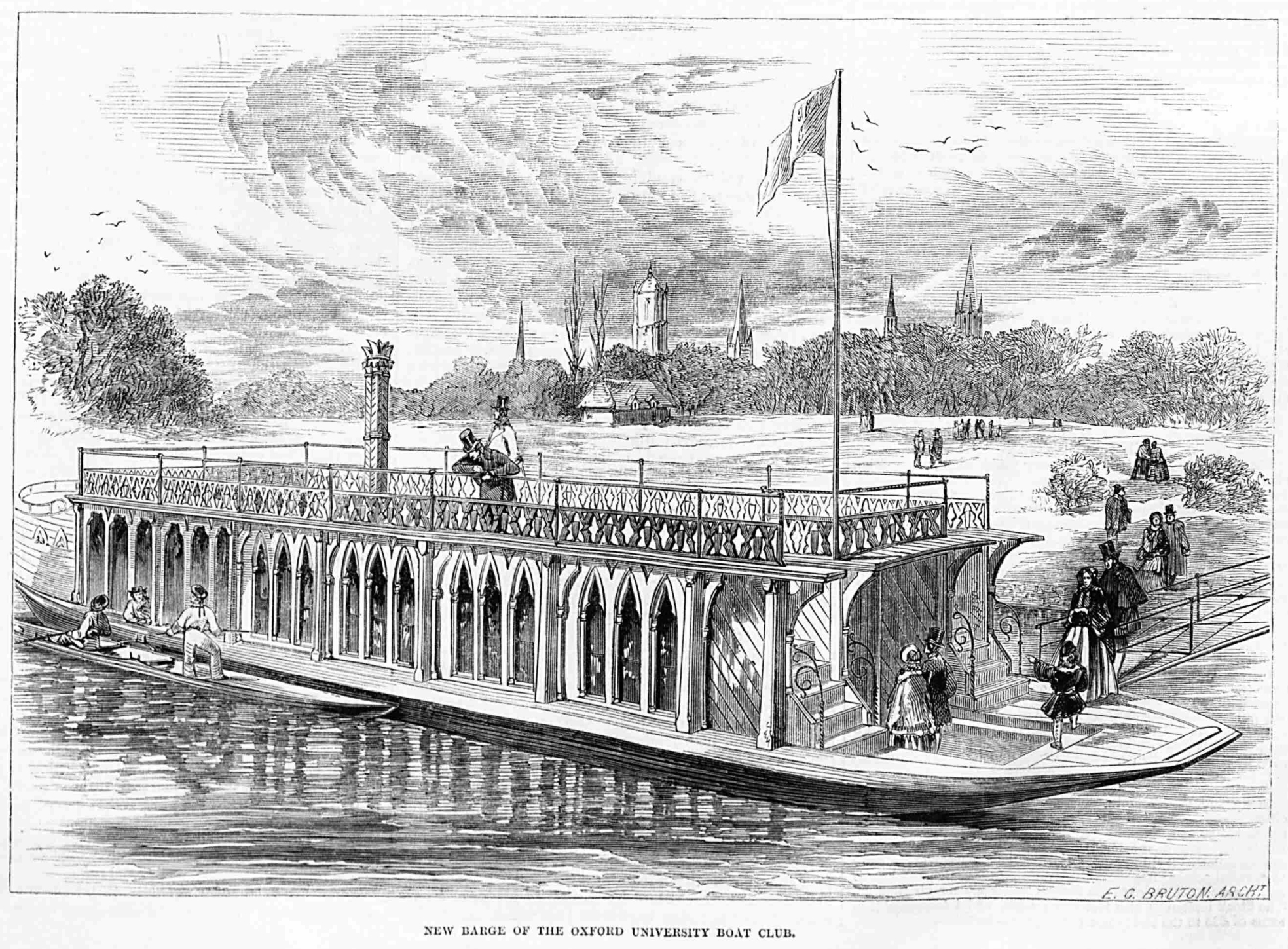
New barge of the Oxford University Boat Club, from the Pen and Pencil (newspaper), 3 March 1855

- Saint Sepulchre's Cemetery, Oxford: lodge (designed as part of the original plan in 1848, but not built until 1865)
- Saint Paul, Walton Street, Oxford: added apse, 1853
- Town Hall, Banbury, Oxfordshire, 1854
- Saint Nicholas, Islip, Oxfordshire: restoration, 1861
- Girls' School, Winslow, Buckinghamshire: school, 1864
- 62 Banbury Road, Oxford: house, 1864–65
- Christ Church Old Buildings, The Hamel, Oxford: tenement block, 1866
- Saint Mary, Black Bourton, Oxfordshire: restoration, 1866
- 64 Banbury Road, Oxford: house, 1868–69
- Chapel of Cowley Middle Class School, Oxford Military College, Cowley, Oxfordshire, 1870
- St John the Evangelist, New Hinksey, Oxfordshire: church, 1870 (demolished 1900)
- Saint Bartholomew, Ducklington, Oxfordshire: restoration, 1871
- Rewley House, Wellington Square, Oxford: house, 1872
- Saints Peter and Paul, Broadwell, Oxfordshire: restoration, 1873
- Saint Nicholas, Emmington, Oxfordshire: enlarged rectory, 1873
- Saint Mary, Hardwick, West Oxfordshire: rebuilt church, 1874
- Saint John the Baptist, Stadhampton, Oxfordshire: rebuilt church and added south aisle, 1875
- Saint Michael's Infants' School, New Inn Hall Street, Oxford, 1876
- Saint Mary, Chipping Norton, Oxfordshire: vicarage, 1880
- The Grange, Little Tew, Oxfordshire: new wing, 1880

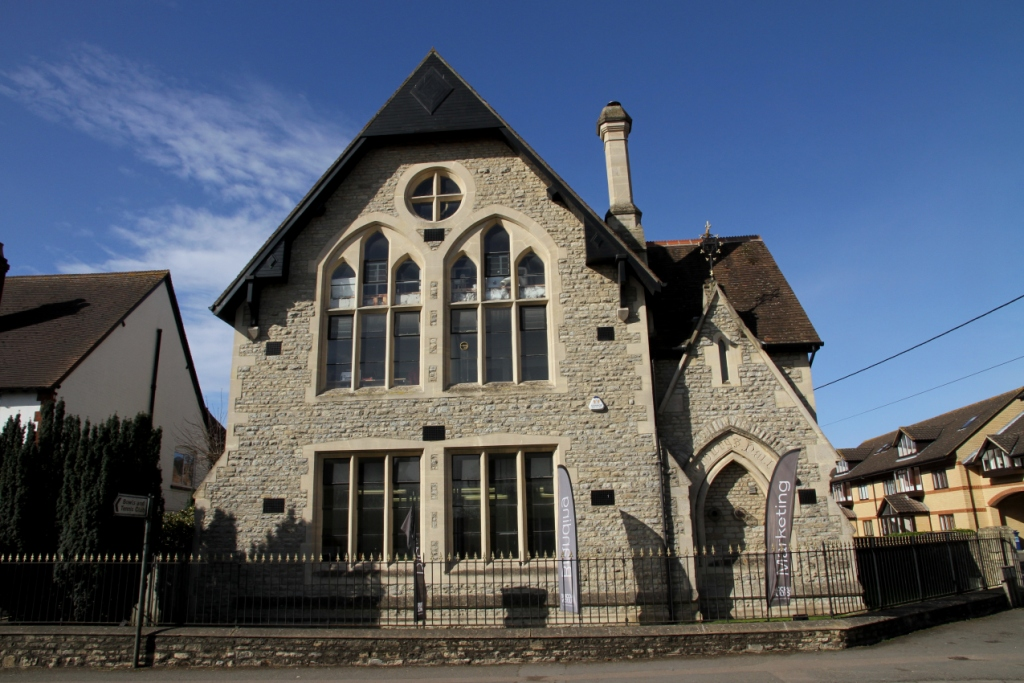
St Edburg's Hall, London Road, Bicester, built in 1882

- St Edburg's Hall, London Road, Bicester, Oxfordshire: 1882
- Saint Bartholomew, Holton, Oxfordshire: vicarage, 1882
- Saints Peter and Paul, Aston Rowant, Oxfordshire: restoration, 1884
- Saint Andrew, Oddington, Oxfordshire: restoration, 1886
- All Saints, Spelsbury, Oxfordshire: remodelled rectory, 1886
- Covered Market, High Street, Oxford: roofs, 1886–97
- Saint Mary, Souldern, Oxfordshire: rectory, 1890

== Sources ==
- Brodie, Antonia; Felstead, Alison; Franklin, Jonathan; Pinfield, Leslie; Oldfield, Jane, eds. (2001). Directory of British Architects 1834–1914, A–K. London & New York: Continuum. p. 284. ISBN 0-8264-5513-1.
- Sherwood, Jennifer; Pevsner, Nikolaus (1974). Oxfordshire. The Buildings of England. Harmondsworth: Penguin Books. ISBN 0-14-071045-0.
- Tyack, Geoffrey (1998). Oxford An Architectural Guide. Oxford & New York: Oxford University Press. ISBN 0-19-817423-3.
