= Blavatnik School of Government =

Public policy school of Oxford University

Coordinates: 51.7594°N 1.2646°W

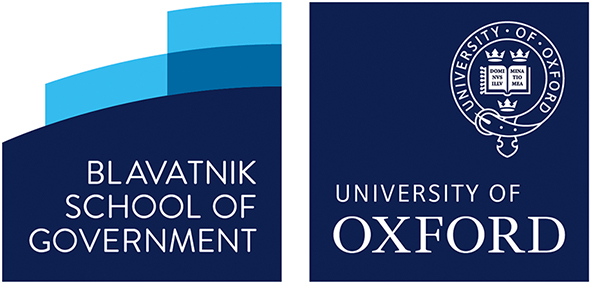
- Coat of arms
- Motto in English: A world better led, better served and better governed.
- Type: Public
- Established: 2010
- Parent institution: University of Oxford
- Dean: Ngaire Woods
- Academic staff: Paul Collier, Stefan Dercon, Karthik Ramanna, Jonathan Wolff, Amal Clooney
- Postgraduates: 144 (2022)
- Doctoral students: 35 (2023)
- Location: Oxford, England
- Website: www.bsg.ox.ac.uk
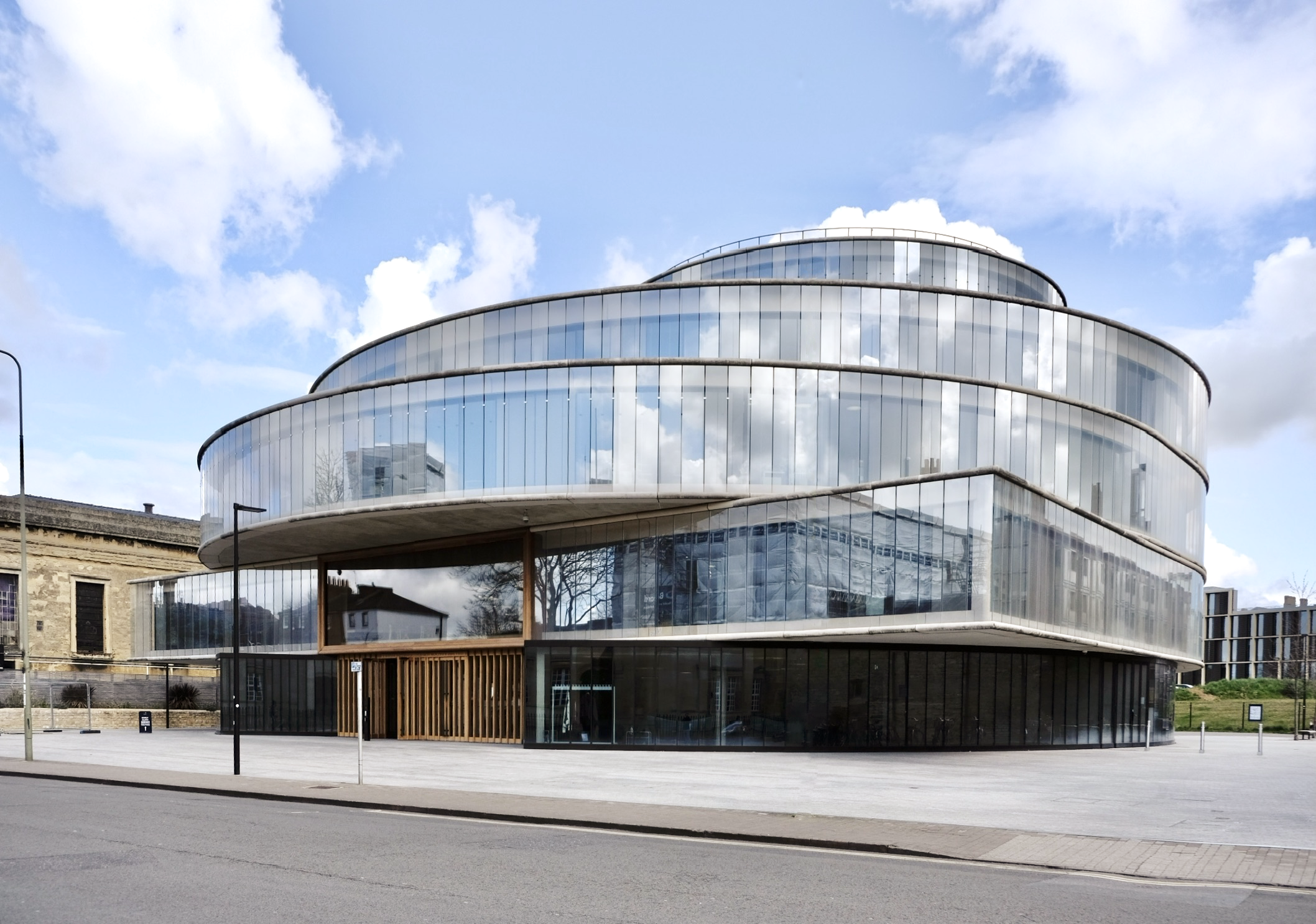
- The 2015 Blavatnik School of Government building by Herzog & de Meuron on Walton Street in Oxford

The Blavatnik School of Government is the school of public policy at the Social Sciences Division at the University of Oxford in Oxford, England, United Kingdom.

The school was founded in 2010 following a £75 million donation from business magnate Len Blavatnik, supported by £26 million from the University of Oxford.

== History ==
Oxford University has a long and storied tradition of educating global leaders, dating back to 1096. Over the centuries, it has produced nearly 60 heads of state and government, cementing its role as a hub for leadership and intellectual excellence. Building on this legacy, the Blavatnik School of Government was envisioned as a modern institution to prepare leaders for the complex challenges of the 21st century.

The idea for the School originated in 2008 during a conversation between John Hood, then Vice-Chancellor of Oxford, and Ngaire Woods, who would become the School's founding dean. Woods, as the founding dean, contributed to developing the School's academic structure to address the changing needs of public policy education. On a train journey back from the World Economic Forum in Davos, Hood remarked on Oxford's lack of a grand institution dedicated to public policy or government studies, despite its historical leadership role.

A transformative milestone came in 2010, when businessman and philanthropist Len Blavatnik made a significant donation to support the establishment of the School. The Blavatnik School of Government officially opened its doors in 2012, welcoming its first Master of Public Policy (MPP) students. In 2014, the School introduced the DPhil in Public Policy, followed by the launch of its executive programs in 2015, aimed at senior practitioners tackling critical global challenges.

In 2016, the School moved into a purpose-built home, inaugurated by HRH Prince William.

== Courses ==
The School's flagship program is the Master of Public Policy (MPP), an intensive one-year graduate degree designed to equip students for impactful careers in public service. Additionally, the School offers an MSc in Public Policy Research and a DPhil (PhD) in Public Policy, a rigorous three-year, full-time research degree. For senior professionals and practitioners, the School provides a variety of executive programs and specialized courses tailored to address specific policy challenges.

Applications are made through University of Oxford's central Graduate Admissions and Funding Office.

== Oxford Institute for Law, Ethics and Armed Conflict (ELAC) ==
The Oxford Institute for Law, Ethics and Armed Conflict (ELAC) is an interdisciplinary research programme based at Blavatnik, which researches and aims to strengthen law, norms and institutions to restrain, regulate and prevent armed conflict. The institute consists of researchers, academics and practitioners in areas such as international law, international relations and philosophy.

== Notable staff ==
Professor Ngaire Woods is the first Dean of the School.

- Dapo Akande, Professor of Public International Law
- Amal Clooney, Visiting Professor of Practice in International Law
- Paul Collier, Professor of Economics and Public Policy
- Janina Dill, Dame Louise Richardson Chair in Global Security
- Stefan Dercon, Professor of Economic Policy
- Pepper Culpepper, Blavatnik Chair in Government and Public Policy
- Peter Kemp, Professor of Public Policy
- Aaron Maniam, Fellow of Practice and Director, Digital Transformation Education
- Ciaran Martin, Professor of Practice in the Management of Public Organisations
- Karthik Ramanna, Professor of Business and Public Policy
- Max Roser, Professor of Practice in Global Data Analytics
- Christopher Stone, Professor of Practice of Public Integrity
- Jonathan Wolff, Professor of Public Policy.

In August 2017 Bo Rothstein resigned his position as Professor of Government and Public Policy in protest at Leonard Blavatnik's support for Donald Trump's Inaugural Committee. Rothstein subsequently criticised the School, stating that he had been "excommunicated" and banned from accessing the building; the School and the University of Oxford denied these claims.

== Notable alumni ==
Alumni include British politician Keir Mather MP; Shamma Al Mazrui, the youngest Minister of Youth Affairs in the United Arab Emirates and two members of parliament in Panama, Gabriel Silva and Edison Broce.

== Building ==
The Blavatnik School of Government is located in the University of Oxford's Radcliffe Observatory Quarter, with its main entrance on Walton Street. The building is designed by architects Herzog & de Meuron to promote open discussion, interaction and collaboration. The central forum is inspired by the idea of openness and transparency and connects all the floors together. Construction work started in autumn 2013, after some controversy, and ended in late 2015. The building is controlled by a combination of systems and technology that helps minimise its environmental impact.

The building is taller than Carfax Tower in the centre of Oxford, thus dominating the site and causing opposition to the scheme by local residents in the Jericho district of the city and elsewhere. The site is immediately to the south of the café/bar Freud, in the historic 1836 Greek Revival St Paul's Church on Walton Street. The scheme was opposed by the cafe's owner, David Freud, due to its size compared to the church building. The site is also opposite the classical Oxford University Press building. In spring 2013, a public meeting was held in St Barnabas Church and the building was described as "a concrete marshmallow". A historic wall on Walton Street would be demolished as part of the plans.

Later in 2015, the building was described as "the latest striking building nearing completion in Oxford".

In June 2016, the building received a RIBA National Award. The building was shortlisted for the Stirling Prize for excellence in architecture (July 2016) and was awarded the Oxford Preservation Trust plaque in the 'new buildings' category (November 2016).
