= Valerie Petts =

English painter

- Born: United Kingdom
- Known for: Architectural painting, Landscape painting, Watercolour painting, Printmaking, Illustration
- Website: www.valeriepetts.co.uk

Valerie Petts is a British watercolourist and book illustrator based in Oxford, England.

Petts is a member of the Oxford Art Society and undertakes some teaching. She has produced paintings for the monthly Limited Edition colour magazine of The Oxford Times. She has exhibited in England, Japan, and South Africa. As well as watercolours and oil paintings, Petts also produces limited edition prints.

Petts has produced many Oxford views, including of Port Meadow. In 2013, Petts exhibited a series of "In Memoriam" oil paintings of Port Meadow after Oxford University's Castle Mill development that has affected views of the Oxford skyline from the meadow, as part of the Oxfordshire Artweeks, at St Barnabas Church in Jericho, Oxford. She was featured in The Oxford Art Book.

== Bibliography ==
Petts has contributed to a number of books:

- Consider England by Valerie Petts and Linda Proud, Shepheard-Walwyn (1994). ISBN 978-0-85683-145-4.
- Oxford Words & Watercolours by Elaine Wilson and Valerie Petts, Oxford Limited (1997). ISBN 978-0953153602.
- The Story of Lady Margaret Beaufort: Mother of Kings and Servant of God by Valerie Petts, St James Publishing (2002). ISBN 978-1903843253.
- Hedges (Resource Management) by Murray MacLean and Valerie Petts, Farming Press (2003). ISBN 978-0852365427.
