= Great Clarendon Street =

Street in Jericho, Oxford, England

Coordinates: 51.7582°N 1.2671°W

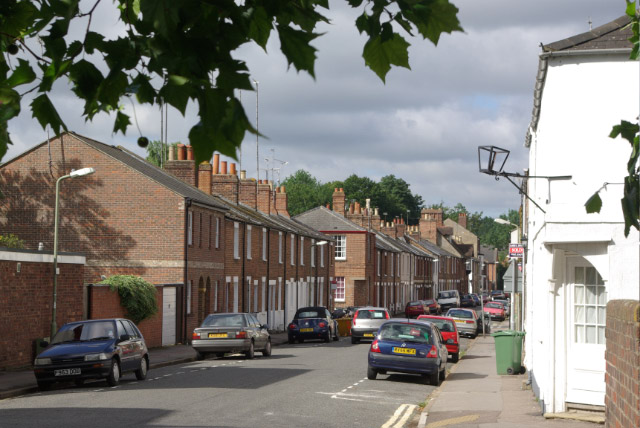
Looking along Great Clarendon Street

Great Clarendon Street is one of the principal thoroughfares of the Jericho district of Oxford, England, an inner suburb northwest of the centre of the city.

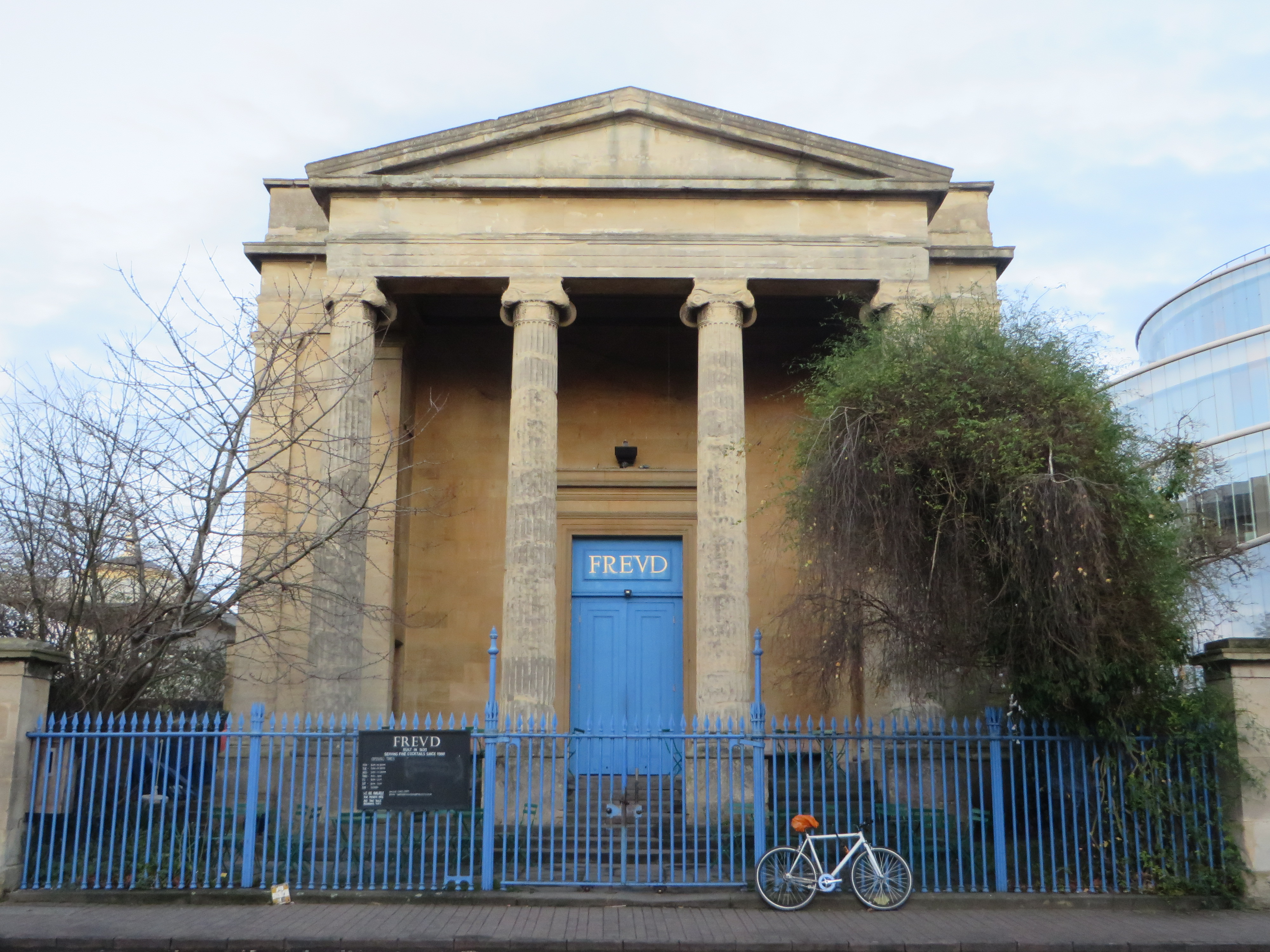
The Freud cafe-bar on Walton Street, in the former St Paul's church building, viewed from the end of Great Clarendon Street

At the northeast end of the street is a junction with Walton Street. Opposite is Freud's, a cafe in the former St Paul's church building constructed in the classical style.

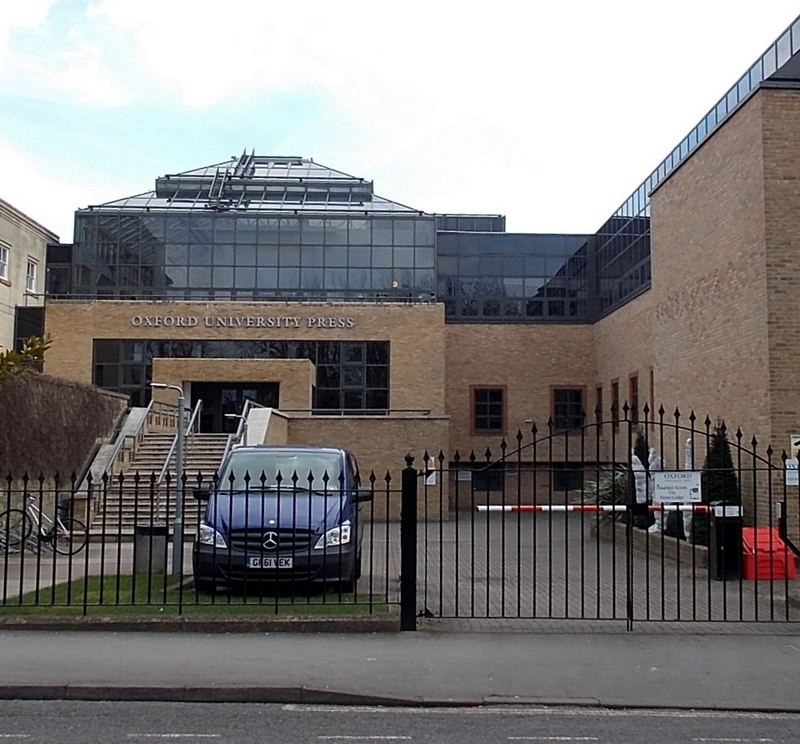
The Great Clarendon Street entrance of the Oxford University Press

To the south is the Oxford University Press, which also houses the Oxford University Press Museum. The southwest end of the street ends near the Oxford Canal, just past the junction with Canal Street.

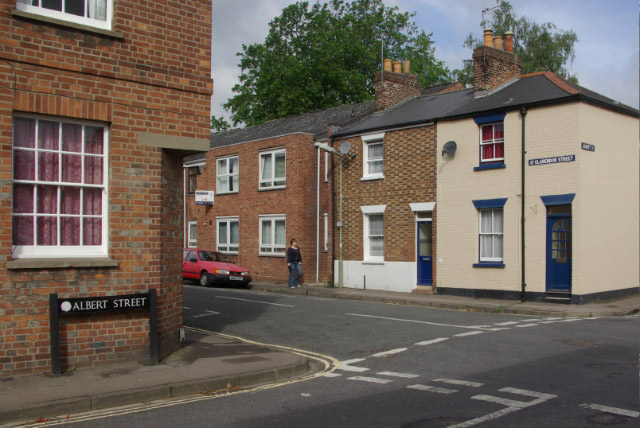
The junction of Great Clarendon Street with Albert Street

Many of the houses here were built in the first half of the 19th century. In the early 19th century, Grey Coat's (University) School was located here. The street was named in 1890–1. The street is named after the Clarendon Press (a.k.a. the Oxford University Press) of Oxford University, which moved to Jericho in 1830.

School Court is a stone building, former school and a Grade II listed building in the street. Originally the Boys' School for St Paul's parish, when St Barnabas parish was created in 1869, the building housed St Barnabas Boys' School and the St Paul's schoolboys moved to a new school building in nearby Juxon Street. In 1963, the school closed and children at St Barnabas moved to the new Cherwell School in North Oxford. 24 Great Clarendon Street is another Grade II listed building and former shop on the corner with Hart Street.

== See also ==
- Little Clarendon Street, a nearby shopping street
