= W. Lucy & Co. =

English multinational company

Lucy Group Ltd
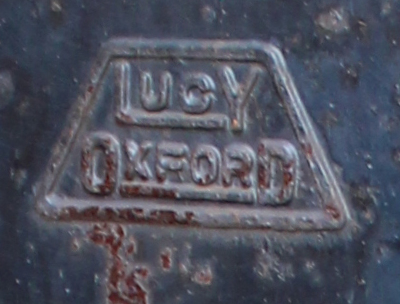
- Type: Private
- Industry: Electrical Engineering and Property
- Founded: Circa 1812, incorporated 1897
- Headquarters: Oxford, UK
- Key people: Richard Dick (Executive Chairman)
- Products: Medium and low voltage electrical switchgear, electrical connectors & disconnectors, isolators, pillars, street lighting controls, traffic lighting and controls, electric vehicle infrastructure, smart city management, fuses, property ownership, lettings and development.
- Revenue: £422 million GBP (2025)
- Number of employees: 2,000
- Website: www.lucygroup.com

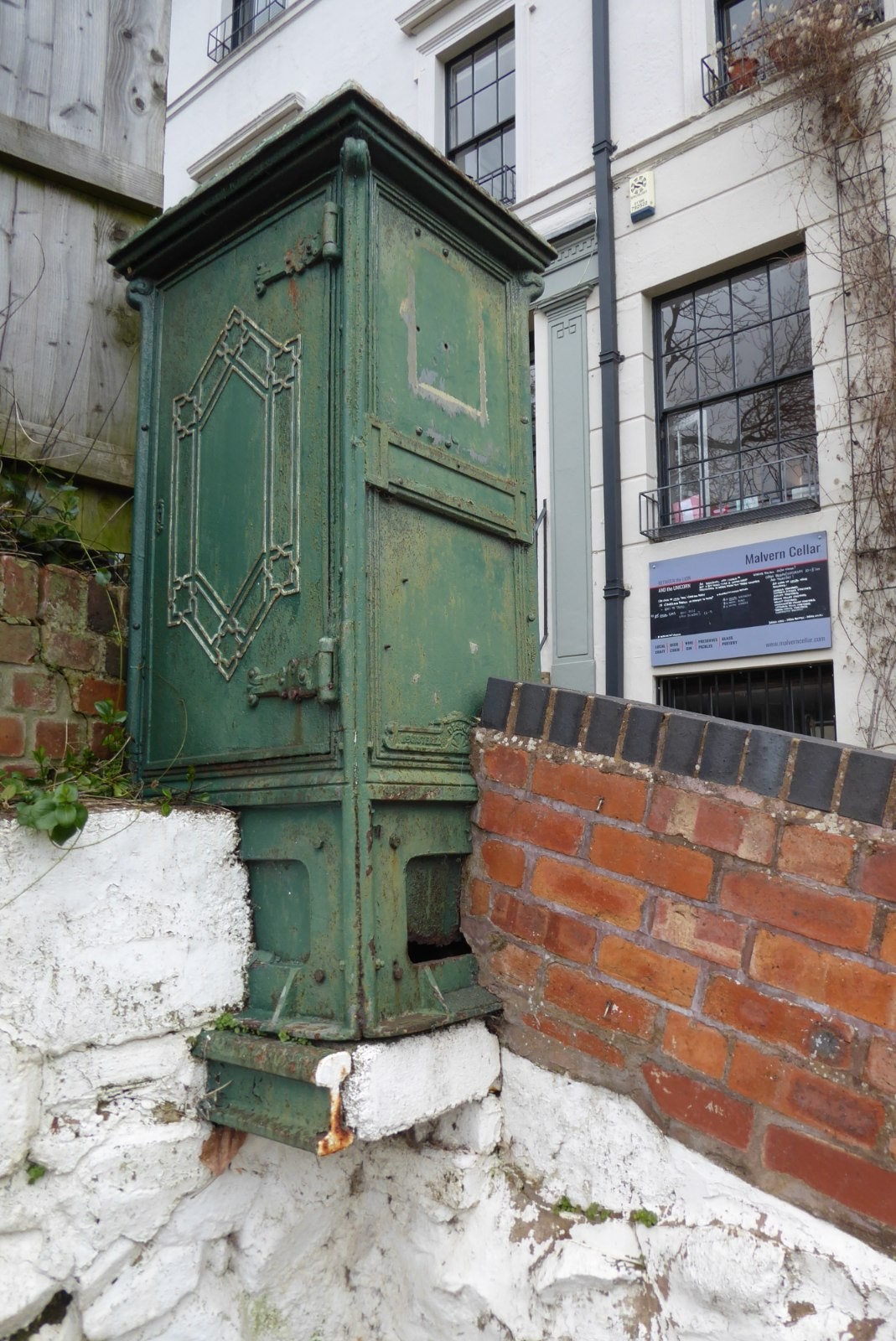

Lucy Group Ltd, formerly W. Lucy & Co. Ltd, is a privately owned international group headquartered in Oxford, England. The company's origins date back more than 200 years when its principal business was manufacturing metal castings. Since then, the business has evolved and steadily expanded into a group comprising three distinct business units: Lucy Electric; Lucy Controls; and Lucy Real Estate.

Lucy Electric designs and manufactures intelligent medium and low voltage electric switchgear (primary and secondary power distribution) products and solutions, with features such as remote operation and monitoring. The business also provides electric vehicle (EV) charging infrastructure solutions including substations and feeder pillars.

Lucy Controls comprises five businesses:

· Lucy Zodion specialises in advanced street lighting controls and power distribution products.

· Lawson Fuses designs, develops and manufactures low-voltage, high-rupturing capacity (HRC) fuses and related components.

· Flashnet offers smart city street lighting and grid management systems.

· TOFCO manufactures street lighting cut-outs, feeder pillars, isolators and related electrical distribution products.

· Blakley Electrics provides high-performance power and lighting solutions, supporting both permanent and temporary installations

Lucy Real Estate comprises two businesses:

· Lucy Properties is a property owner and lettings & management business within Oxfordshire.

· Lucy Developments is a developer of residential homes in and around Oxfordshire.

Lucy Group has operations in 13 countries, trades in 80 countries and employs over 2,000 people. In the year ending 31 December 2025, Lucy Group had a turnover of £422m, with Profit Before Tax of £56m.

== History ==
The company's origins date back to 1812 when William Carter opened an ironmongery business in Oxford. Carter began brass and iron foundry operations in Summertown, Oxford in 1821, which he expanded into the Jericho district of Oxford in 1825, building a large factory, the Eagle Ironworks, next to the strategically important Oxford to Birmingham canal. In its early days the company manufactured agricultural machinery and ornamental ironwork such as balconies and railings. William Lucy, whose name the company carries, became involved with the company around 1854 at a young age. He died in 1873.

The mainstay of Lucy's business shifted focus in the late 1800s, as it became a key supplier of bookshelves and document storage systems to government offices, universities, museums and libraries, following the introduction of its patented ‘rolling stack’ system of shelving. The emerging electricity industry then presented a new opportunity around the turn of the 20th century.

In 1905, John Reid Dick, a businessman and qualified electrical engineer, was headhunted to join the business as managing director and the company began winning contracts in the electrical industry for street lighting posts, feeder pillars and fuse boxes. Expansion in this market continued and between the two world wars the company cemented its reputation as a switchgear and electrical engineering firm, although the foundry played a complementary part, continuing to supply castings and other products to established markets. Switchgear and components used in secondary power distribution, such as ring main units, remain a significant revenue stream more than 100 years on. The company expanded its focus to include overseas markets in the late 1960s.

Gordon Dick was appointed chairman on his father’s death in January 1951. A number of the decisions that he took in the first twenty years of his chairmanship were of ‘company making’ proportions. They gave the company financial strength and strong market positions. Between 1954 and 1966, he bought the freeholds that made up the enlarged Eagle Works site. During the 1960s and 70s, further freeholds were bought and properties built that form the core of Lucy Properties’ residential estate. On the technical side, with the recruitment of two switchgear design engineers in 1966 through to launch in 1970, Gordon Dick oversaw the development of the oil-insulated Lucy Ring Main Unit; for thirty years this was the company’s ‘flagship’ and most profitable product. Moreover, following the recruitment of Ralph Holland in 1968, the company’s sales and marketing effort was re-focused on overseas markets, particularly the Middle East.

From 1969 to 1980, the board was unchanged: Nicholson and Gowers non-executive, Holland managing director and Gordon Dick chairman. It couldn’t last forever: Nicholson, a director since 1969, retired in 1981; Gordon’s son Richard was appointed a director in his place. Gowers, on the board since 1968, retired in 1984. Holland, a director since 1970, retired as managing director in 1988, whereupon Richard Dick took over (Holland continuing as non-executive until 1999).

By 1989 the foundry was well equipped, quality had been improved and many of the environmental problems had been overcome. Site congestion was now the main obstacle to expansion. The directors had considered relocating the foundry and had got as far as identifying a site in Witney. Unfortunately, the recession that was to do so much damage to British manufacturing industry in the early 1990s meant that business was turning down for the foundry’s trade customers.

The company grew as the Indian market developed and completed a substantial expansion of its facilities in 2004. Close cooperation with Crompton Greaves continued, and Lucy’s had high expectations for this venture in one of the world’s fastest-growing markets. In 2003 it was announced that Lucy Electric would move to Thame; by 2005, it was installed there, and Eagle Works was cleared for redevelopment.

The redevelopment of Eagle Works began in 2004 and was completed in December 2008. Lucy Real Estate business unit was established to combine Lucy Properties, Lucy Development, and Lucy Block Management.

Zodion Limited Net Assets were acquired in 2011 and integrated with Lucy Lighting to become Lucy Zodion Ltd. The acquisition fits into Lucy’s strategy for street lighting, and the resulting combination of the two businesses provides greater resources for new product development.

In 2015, Lucy Group acquired all CG’s equity interests in CG Lucy Switchgear Ltd, an Indian company. Following the acquisition, the company became wholly owned by Lucy Group and formed part of the Group’s medium voltage, secondary power distribution business unit, Lucy Electric. The deal formed part of Lucy Electric’s strategy to grow its business in developing markets and allowed the company to meet the growing demand for electrical infrastructure equipment and the development of Smart Grid projects in India.

In 2018, Lucy Group acquired Arteche’s medium voltage switchgear business in Brazil, Lucy Arteche Equipamentos Eléctricos Ltda (Lucy Arteche) With over 70 years of experience in the electric power industry, Arteche introduced Lucy Electric’s products into South America.

2018 saw further major growth for Lucy Group. Lawson Fuses, a UK-based specialist in the design, development, and manufacture of High Rupturing Capacity (HRC) low voltage fuses, was acquired by the company. The investment was part of its strategy of acquiring complementary businesses to deliver continued sustainable growth. Lawson Fuses India was originally established in 2003 to manufacture a range of fuses and fuse holders to complement the Lawson UK range and satisfy the needs of the Indian market. In 2020 the subsidiary moved from New Delhi to a brand new, modern manufacturing facility near Vadodara and subsequently changed its trading name to Lawson Lucy India Private Limited to become fully incorporated under the Lucy Group umbrella.

In 2022, Lucy Group acquired an 80% majority shareholding in Flashnet S.A., a Romanian-based business specialising in the design, development and manufacture of smart lighting and smart city control systems. Lucy Group acquired the majority interest from Engie Group.

In 2023, Lucy Group acquired the assets and IP of Fundamentals Ltd’s Artificial Intelligence & Machine Learning (AI/ML) business. Focusing on grid monitoring and fault location, the AI/ML capability was merged with Lucy Electric’s GridKey intelligent Low Voltage (LV) remote monitoring system and digital substation activities.

In 2025 Lucy Group acquired Blakley Electrics Ltd, a UK market leader in power distribution systems and industrial lighting equipment. The acquisition strengthened Lucy’s position in the power and industrial lighting sectors and broadens the range of services provided to customers.

In 2026 Lucy Group acquired Nuventura GmbH, an innovative leader in primary SF6-free switchgear for the electric energy sector. Founded in Berlin, Germany, in 2017, Nuventura brought to market the world’s first 36kV dry air GIS and has since developed a 24kV version for medium voltage applications.

Also in 2026, Lucy Group has acquired TOFCO CPP Ltd, a UK-based manufacturer and supplier of electrical distribution and highway electrical products.

== Headquarters ==
Lucy Group's corporate headquarters are on the company's historic former factory site at Eagle Works, in Jericho, Oxford.

== Business ==
Lucy Electric, formerly known as Lucy Switchgear, is primarily based in Thame, Oxfordshire, UK. However, the company has offices in Saudi Arabia, United Arab Emirates, South Africa, Australia and Malaysia, with manufacturing facilities in the UK, United Arab Emirates, Saudi Arabia, India, Thailand and Brazil. Through industrial partners and contractors, Lucy Electric has an established international network and a local track record in over 60 countries. In 2024 Lucy Electric launched its EcoTec ring main unit, the first in the UK to replace SF6 gas – a potent greenhouse gas used as an insulator – with synthetic air.

Lucy Zodion, renamed after their core product in 2004, moved to Zodion House, Station Road, Sowerby Bridge, where they operate today. In 2019, Lucy Zodion unlocked the potential of tomorrow’s cities with its next-generation IoT solution, Ki., a platform for smarter and more responsive cities.

Lucy Real Estate is split into two businesses: Lucy Developments and Lucy Properties. The company’s first purchases of houses had been made in connection with the manufacturing business. However, in 1965 the company bought a block of houses in Juxon Street from St John’s College. Planning permission was received to demolish eight Juxon Street houses and build a three-story block of twenty-three flats with garaging underneath – known as Castle Mill House. When the flats were completed in 1969, they all needed new tenants.

Castle Mill formed the beginning of Lucy Real Estates' influence on property and development in the Oxford area. Real Estate has worked on a range of projects over the years; Brown Field Development, Walton Meadow, and Wharf Mews to name a few.

Lucy Properties is now one of the largest landlords in Oxford city, providing homes for over 850 tenants in more than 650 properties.

== Management and ownership ==
The board of the group's parent company Lucy Group Ltd, has been chaired by Richard Dick since 1990. The board is served by a further three executive and three non-executive directors.

The company's shares are not quoted on any stock market and remain largely under the ownership of descendants of the Dick and Madgen families, who took control of the company in 1905.

== See also ==
- Eagle Ironworks, Oxford
