= Oxford Art Society =

Artists' society in Oxford, England

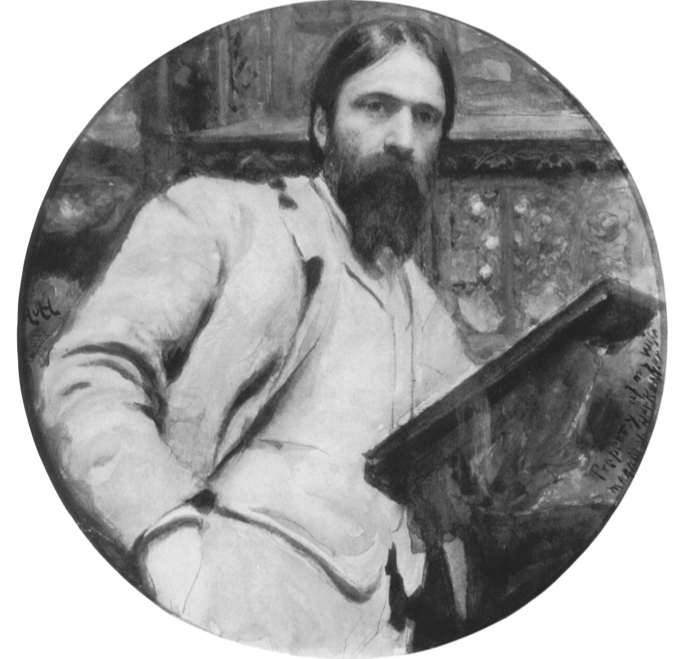
Self-portrait of Hubert von Herkomer, the first president of the society

The Oxford Art Society (OAS) is a society for artists based in the city of Oxford, England.

The society was established in 1891 by Walter Tyrwhitt, with the aim of encouraging art in the city of Oxford and also the University. Its first president was Hubert von Herkomer (1849–1914), a Royal Academician who succeeded John Ruskin as the Slade Professor of Fine Art at Oxford.

The society has held exhibitions every year except during the Second World War. It has held two exhibitions annually, a Members' Exhibition and an Open Exhibition, since 1972. The Open Exhibition is used to attract new members, by invitation. The 2018 Open Exhibition was held in The Cloister Gallery at St John the Evangelist Church, Oxford. In 2019, it was held at The Oxfordshire Museum in the town of Woodstock, north of Oxford.

The chairman of the society is Lucy Stopford. She was on a panel of experts selecting artworks for the 2018 The Oxford Art Book. Members of the society include Valerie Petts.

== Former Members ==
- . James Allen Shuffrey (1858-1939), the watercolour artist, was an early member of the Society.
