= Lyra's Oxford =

2003 fantasy novella by Philip Pullman

- First edition
- Author: Philip Pullman
- Cover artist: John Lawrence
- Language: English
- Genre: Fantasy short story
- Publisher: Alfred A. Knopf Books for Young Readers
- Publication date: 28 October 2003
- Publication place: United Kingdom
- Media type: Print (Hardback & paperback)
- Pages: 64 pp
- ISBN: 0-375-82819-2
- OCLC: 53317246
- Dewey Decimal: [Fic] 22
- LC Class: PZ7.P968 Ly 2003

Lyra's Oxford is a 2003 novella by Philip Pullman depicting an episode involving the heroine of His Dark Materials, Pullman's best-selling trilogy. Lyra's Oxford is set when Lyra Belacqua is 15, two years after the end of the trilogy.

The book consists mainly of an illustrated short story, "Lyra and the Birds". A fold-out map of "Oxford by Train, River and Zeppelin" is bound in the book, a fictional map of Oxford as it exists in Lyra's world. It also includes some advertisements for books and travellers' catalogues. Two pages from a Baedeker published in Lyra's world (including entries for the Eagle Ironworks, the Oxford Canal, the Fell Press and the Oratory of St Barnabas the Chymist, all in the Jericho area of Lyra's Oxford), a postcard from the character Mary Malone, and a brochure for the cruise ship Zenobia are also included. The postcard contains four images of sites in the His Dark Materials trilogy: the physics lab in which Mary Malone works, the house occupied by Lord Boreal, the row of hornbeam trees where Will first discovered a window between the worlds, and the bench where Lyra and Will have pledged to visit each other in spirit once a year.

The preface by Pullman begins:

"This book contains a story and several other things. The other things might be connected with the story, or they might not; they might be connected to stories that haven't appeared yet. It's hard to tell."

== "Lyra and the Birds" plot summary ==
Lyra is looking at a flock of birds from the tower of Jordan College in her Oxford, when she notices that the birds are attacking what turns out to be a dæmon in the shape of a fellow bird. This dæmon must be a witch's because there is no human near. Lyra saves the dæmon, called Ragi, from the flock, and he urges Lyra to help him find a man called Sebastian Makepeace. Lyra cleverly figures out where to find him and that he is the last remaining alchemist, and promises Ragi to bring him to the alchemist after school. In the evening, Lyra escapes from St Sophia's School and leads Ragi from outside Jordan College (Turl Street) to Juxon Street where Sebastian Makepeace lives. Ragi flies above Lyra and hides on roofs to avoid suspicion. On the way, Ragi is attacked by some pigeons, but manages to save himself. Ragi also tells Lyra why he needs Sebastian Makepeace's help: his witch, Yelena Pazhets, is seriously ill. This new illness causes witches to die while not affecting their dæmons, leaving them alive and lonely after their witch's death. Lyra is shocked by this.

Reaching Makepeace's house at the end of Juxon Street, near the Oxford Canal, Lyra's dæmon Pantalaimon manages to look through Makepeace's window without being noticed by Ragi. Pan sees the alchemist lying on the floor and witch's instruments nearby. Sensing something is wrong, Lyra continues walking, past Makepeace's house, at which Ragi cries for his witch. Lyra realises it was a trap and now finds herself being attacked by the witch. She moves towards the canal and decides to fight the witch, because this is what Will would do.

When Yelena charges, a swan rushes past Lyra and attacks her. Yelena dies shortly after. Lyra carries the swan back to the canal, after which a recovered Sebastian Makepeace takes her into his house and explains that Yelena wanted to kill Lyra and blame him for the murder: Yelena was once Sebastian's lover and their son died in the war that was waged in The Amber Spyglass. Yelena blamed Lyra for her son's death. The dead witch Yelena in the middle of the street caused some consternation; Sebastian helps Lyra to get away unnoticed. Lyra returns to St Sophia's. Back home, Lyra and Pan contemplate the day's events: the birds were actually helping her, and, looking for some meaning behind the events, Lyra feels that Oxford is protecting her.
