= Canal Street, Oxford =

Street in Jericho, Oxford, England

Coordinates: 51.758052°N 1.269482°W

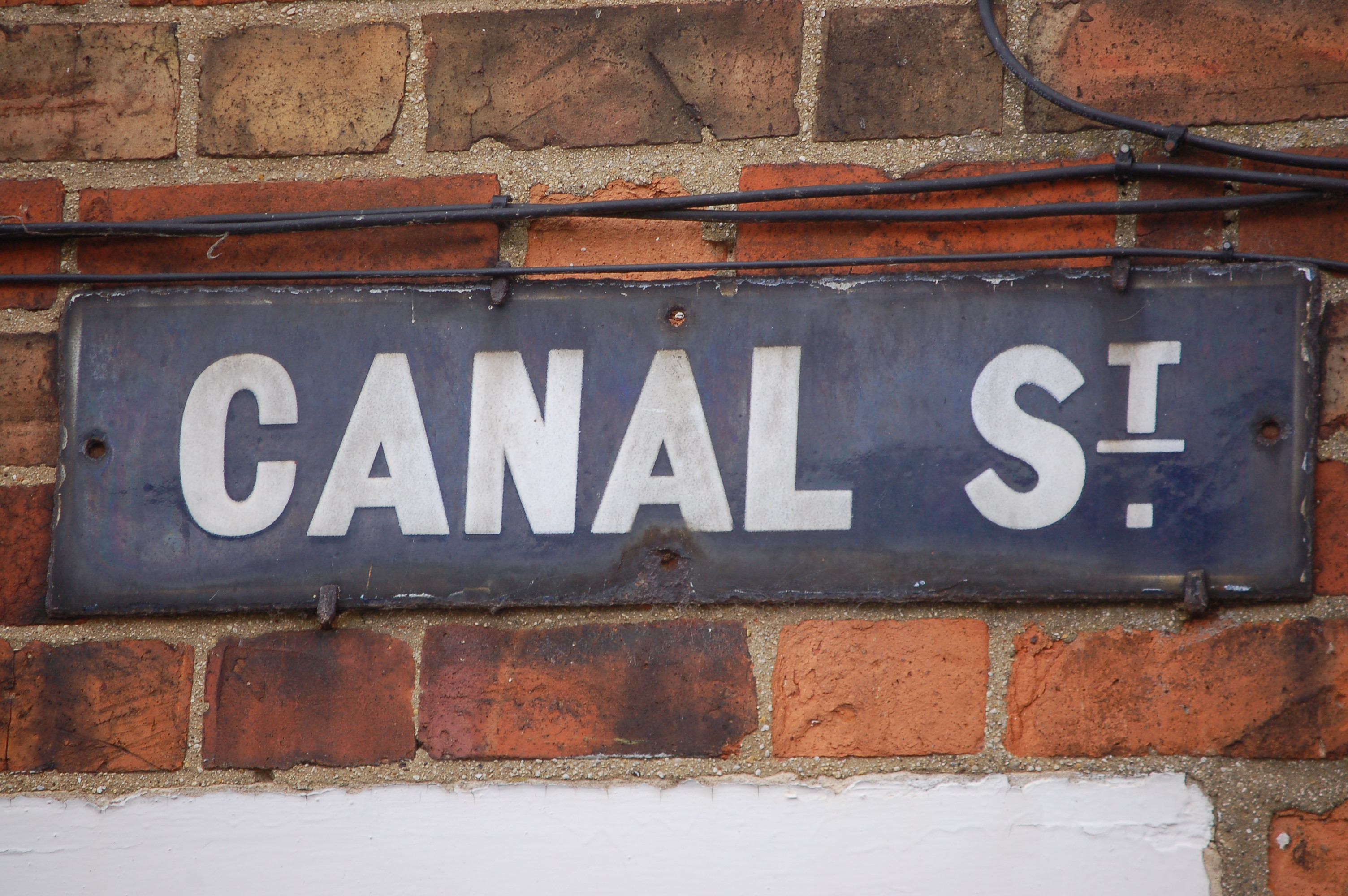
Canal Street sign

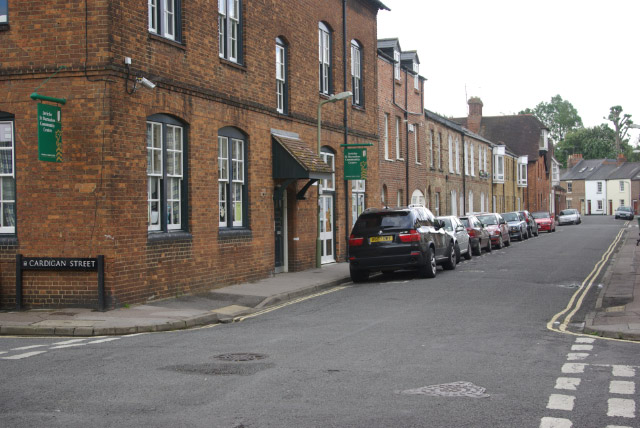
View along Canal Street

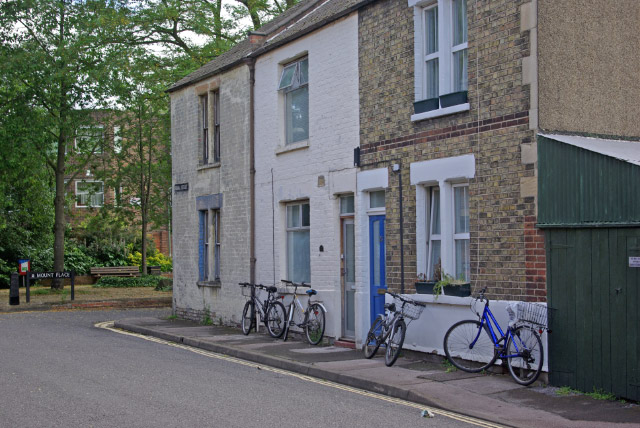
Houses on Canal Street

Canal Street is a residential street in Jericho, an inner suburb of Oxford, England, northwest of the city centre.

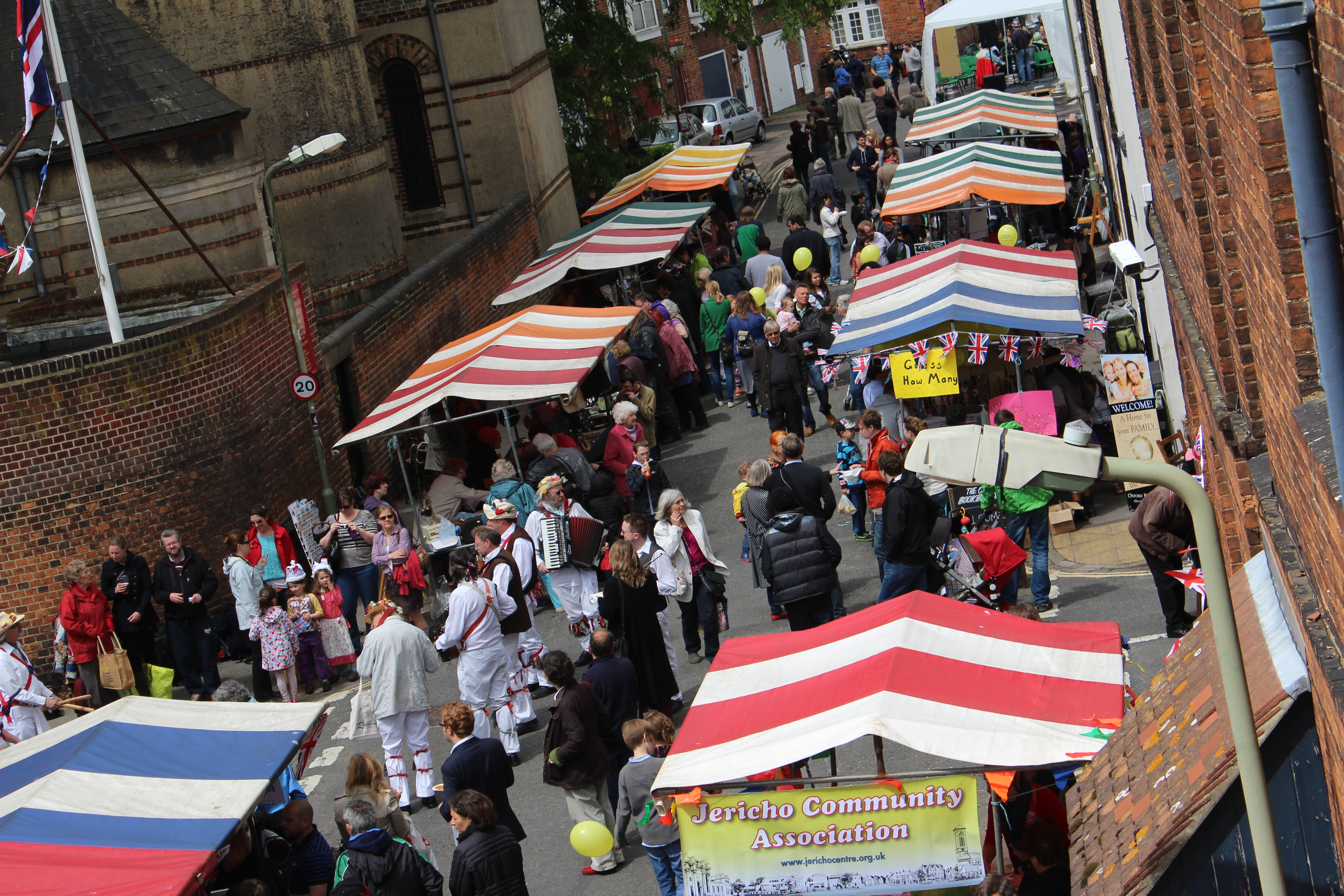
Jericho Street Fair, held in Canal Street each summer

The annual Jericho Street Fair takes place in Canal Street, normally close to 11 June, the feast day of the patron saint Barnabas.

== Location ==
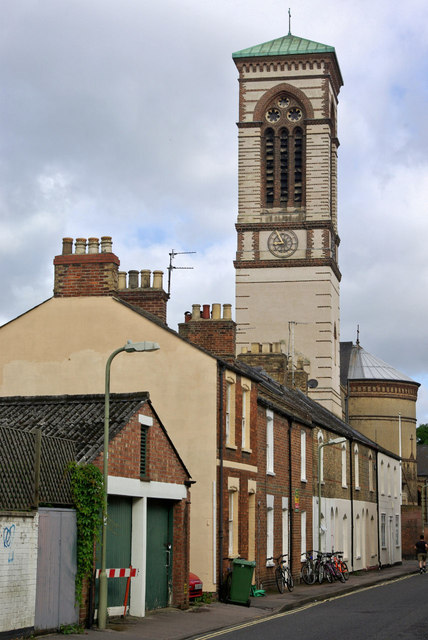
View of the campanile of St Barnabas Church from the south along Canal Street

Canal Street runs northwest–southeast, with the Oxford Canal just to the west, hence the name. The street is dominated by the campanile of St Barnabas Church. Towards the southern end is a junction with Great Clarendon Street, a major thoroughfare in Jericho.

The Jericho Community Centre, run by the Jericho Community Association, is located in Canal Street. Canal boats can be rented on the canal at Canal Street. The Old Bookbinders Ale House is a public house in the street that serves French cuisine. A boatyard is also located here and narrow boats can be hired on the canal. To the south are the grounds of Worcester College.

== History ==
Previously the Jericho area was part of the Walton Manor farm owned by St John's College, Oxford. The Oxford Canal was opened in 1790 and the street was named Canal Street around 1870. St Barnabas Church was consecrated in 1869. The Old Bookbinders Ale House pub in the street was also established in 1869. There used to be a ferry (with ferry house) and coal wharves close to the north end of Canal Street. Flooding has always been an issue, due to the proximity of the canal. Although most of the houses in the street are small two-storey terraced houses, Canal Street is now a popular inner-city residential street with high property prices due to its convenient central location.

== Fiction ==
"Canal Reach", in actuality Combe Road, off Canal Street leading to the canal, was used as the location of a murder in The Dead of Jericho, the fifth Inspector Morse novel by Colin Dexter, published in 1981. The area was used as a location for the adaptation in the Inspector Morse television series starring John Thaw. Morse and Lewis discussed the case together at the Bookbinders Arms (now the Old Bookbinders Ale House) in The Dead of Jericho episode.

== Gallery ==
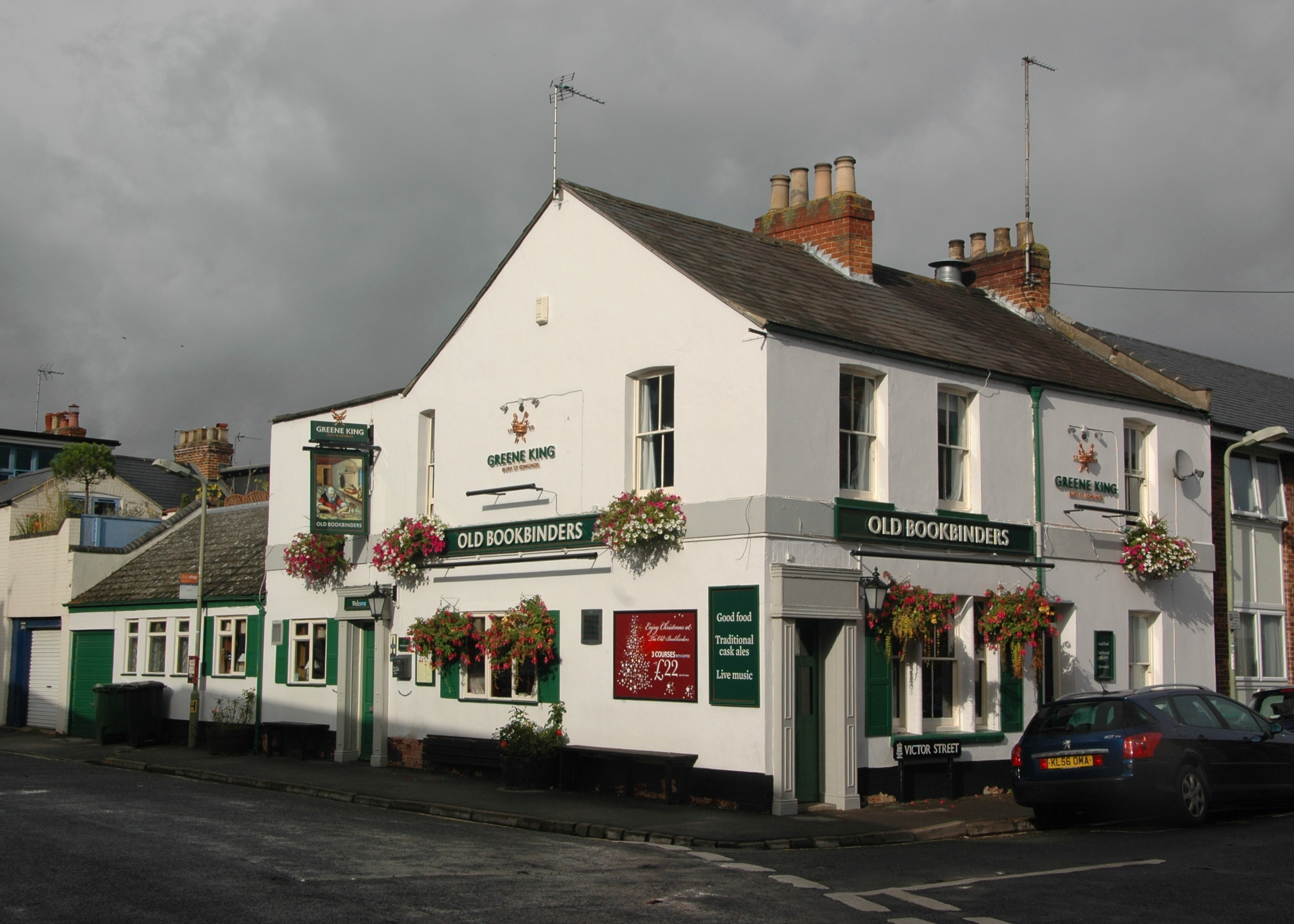
The Old Bookbinders public house in Canal Street

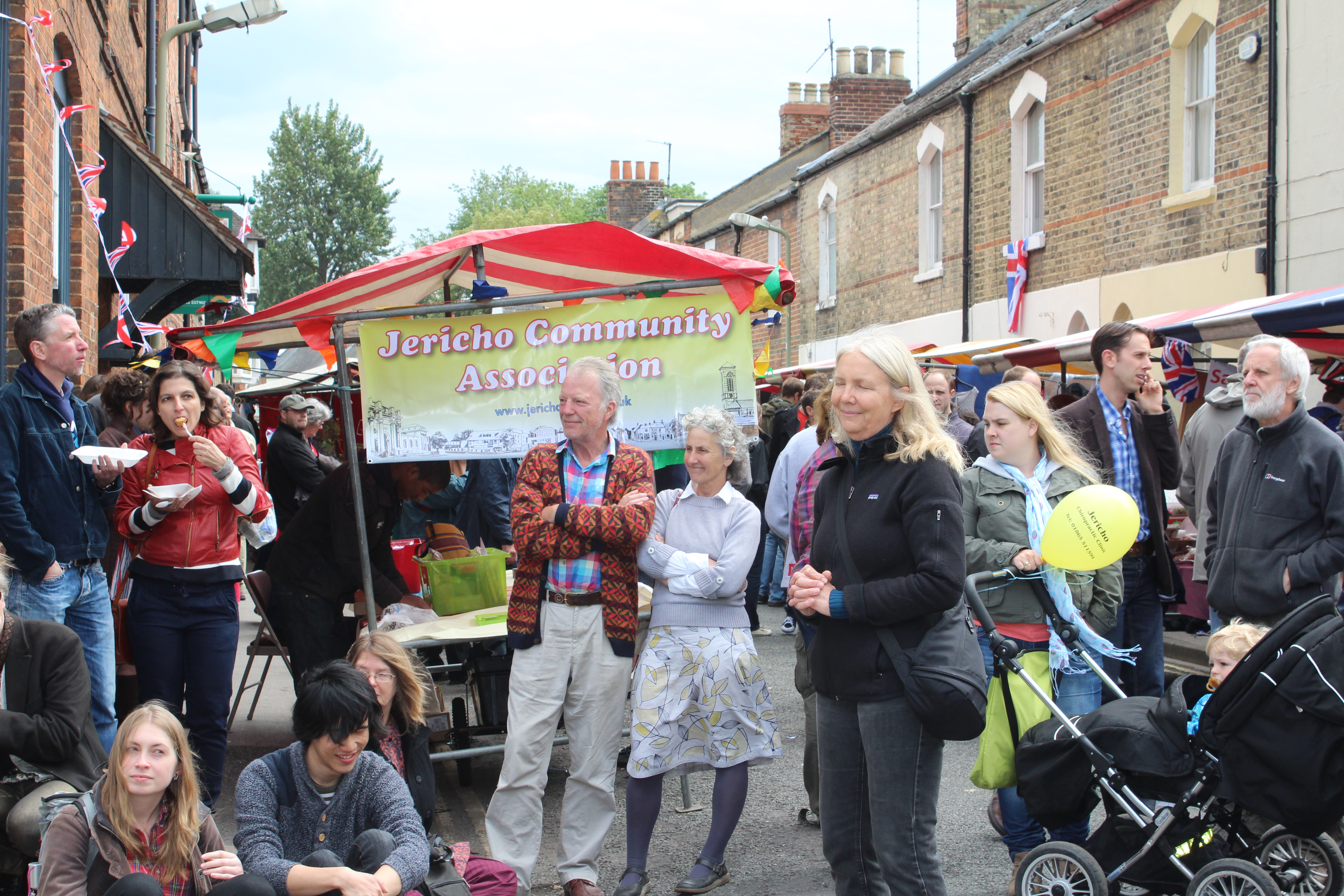
Jericho Street Fair, in Canal Street

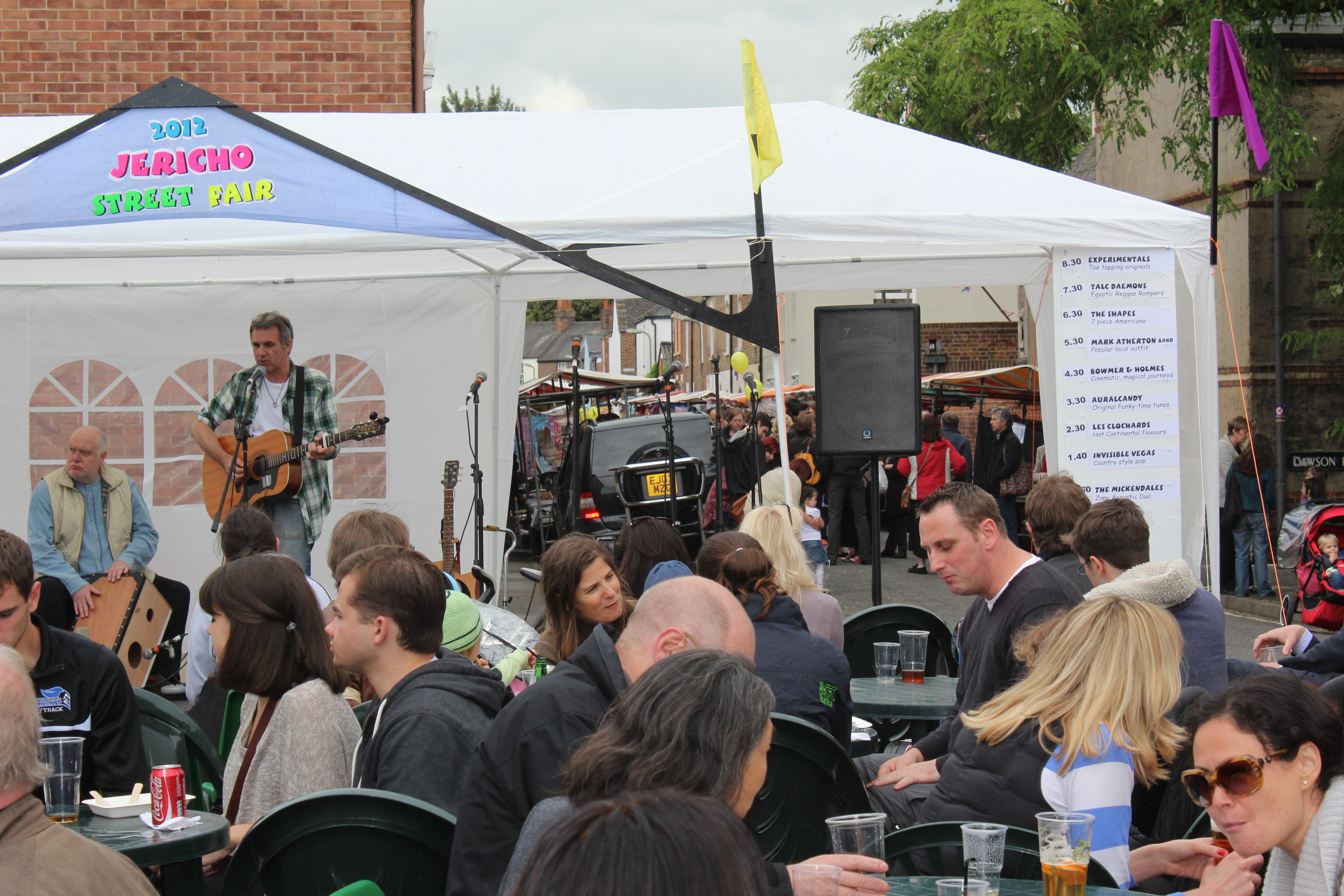
Music outside the Old Bookbinders pub in Canal Street
