= Art Jericho =

Art gallery in Oxford, England

Coordinates: 51.75979086°N 1.26640122°W

Art Jericho is a contemporary art gallery in Jericho, northwest central Oxford, England.

The gallery is managed by Jenny Blyth Fine Art. It participates in the annual Oxfordshire Artweeks art festival each May and holds regular temporary exhibitions for artists. Concerts are occasionally held at the gallery.
