= Juxon Street =

Street in Jericho, Oxford, England

Coordinates: 51.760503°N 1.268676°W

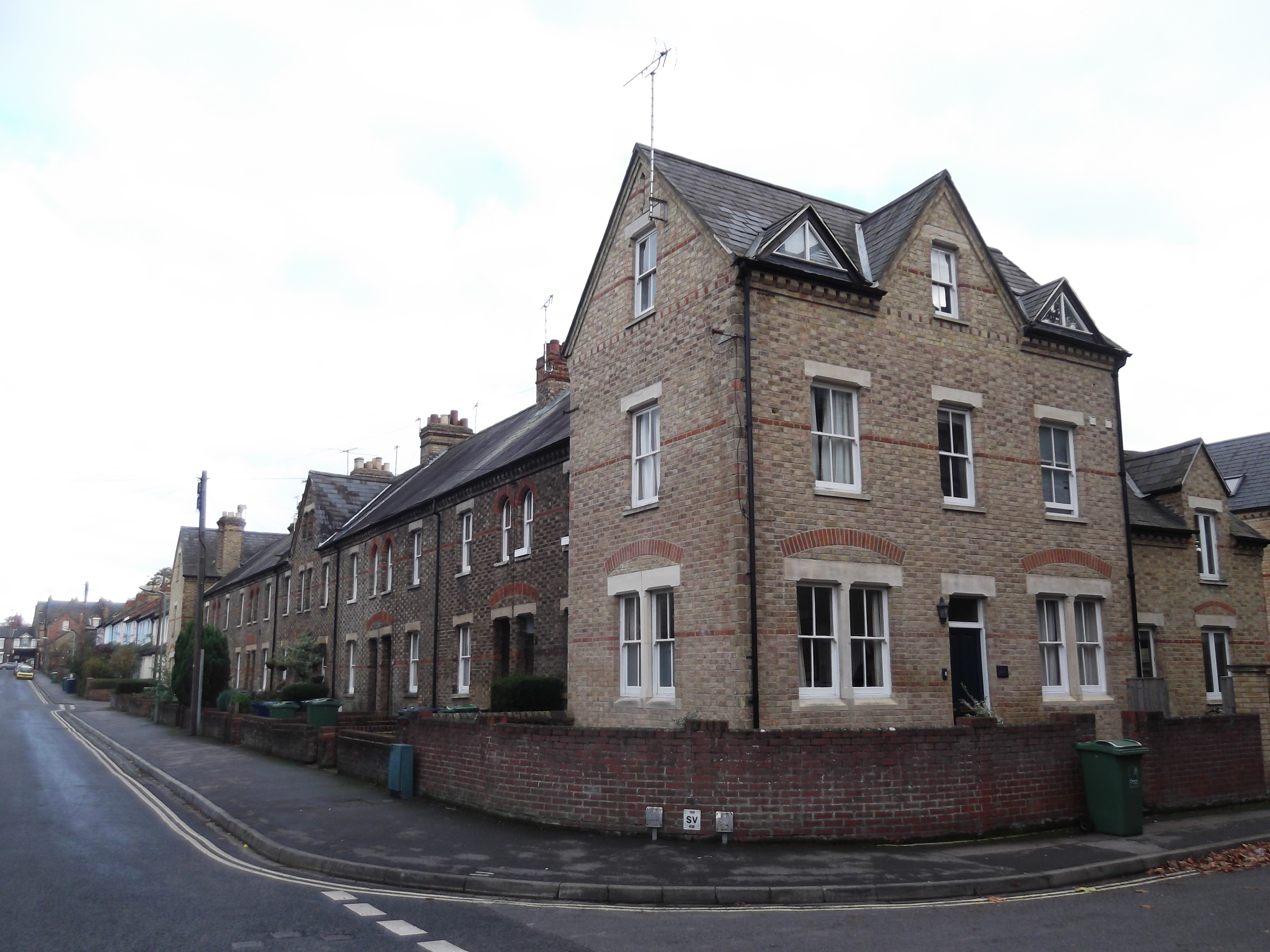
View east along the south side of Juxon Street.

Juxon Street is a street in the north of Jericho, an inner suburb of Oxford, England.

== Location ==
To the east is a junction with Walton Street. To the north are St Sepulchre's Cemetery, Lucy's Eagle Ironworks (now residential), and beyond that Walton Well Road. To the west is the Oxford Canal and beyond that the Castle Mill Stream. To the south is most of the rest of the suburb of Jericho and central Oxford.

== History ==
Previously this area was part of the Walton Manor farm owned by St John's College, Oxford. The farm was sold the site was unoccupied until 1860 when the college architect, William Wilkinson, was commissioned to lay out the northern part of the estate. The street was named after William Juxon, who was President of St John's College from 1621 to 1633. He was also the Bishop of London and the Archbishop of Canterbury.

Building began in Juxon Street in 1876. The houses were designed to provide small homes for middle-class families. Much of the north side of the street was bought by Lucy's Eagle Ironworks also just to the north to house its staff. Many of the houses have also been for rented to students. Some houses at the west end of the street were demolished and flats was constructed in their place. It is now a popular inner-city residential street with high prices and rents in the area.

There used to be a ferry (with ferry house) and coal wharfs at the end of Juxon Street.

== Literature ==
Juxon Street features in the 2003 book Lyra's Oxford by Philip Pullman. Lyra visits the character Sebastian Makepeace who lives on the north side of Juxon Street in a house at the end of the street near the Eagle Ironworks and the Oxford Canal.

== Gallery ==
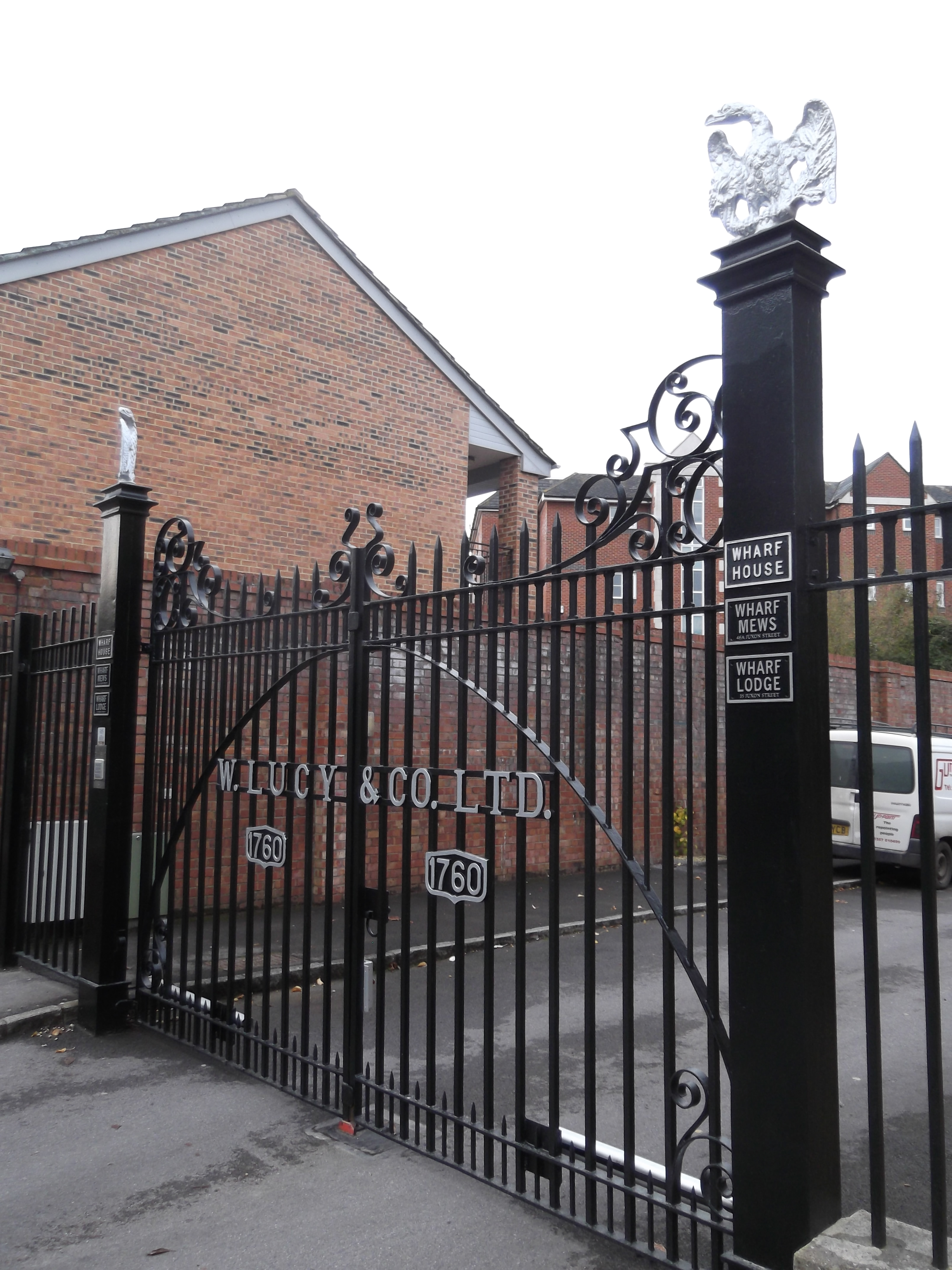
Gateway to the former William Lucy Eagle Ironworks (now redeveloped as residential apartments) on Juxon Street.

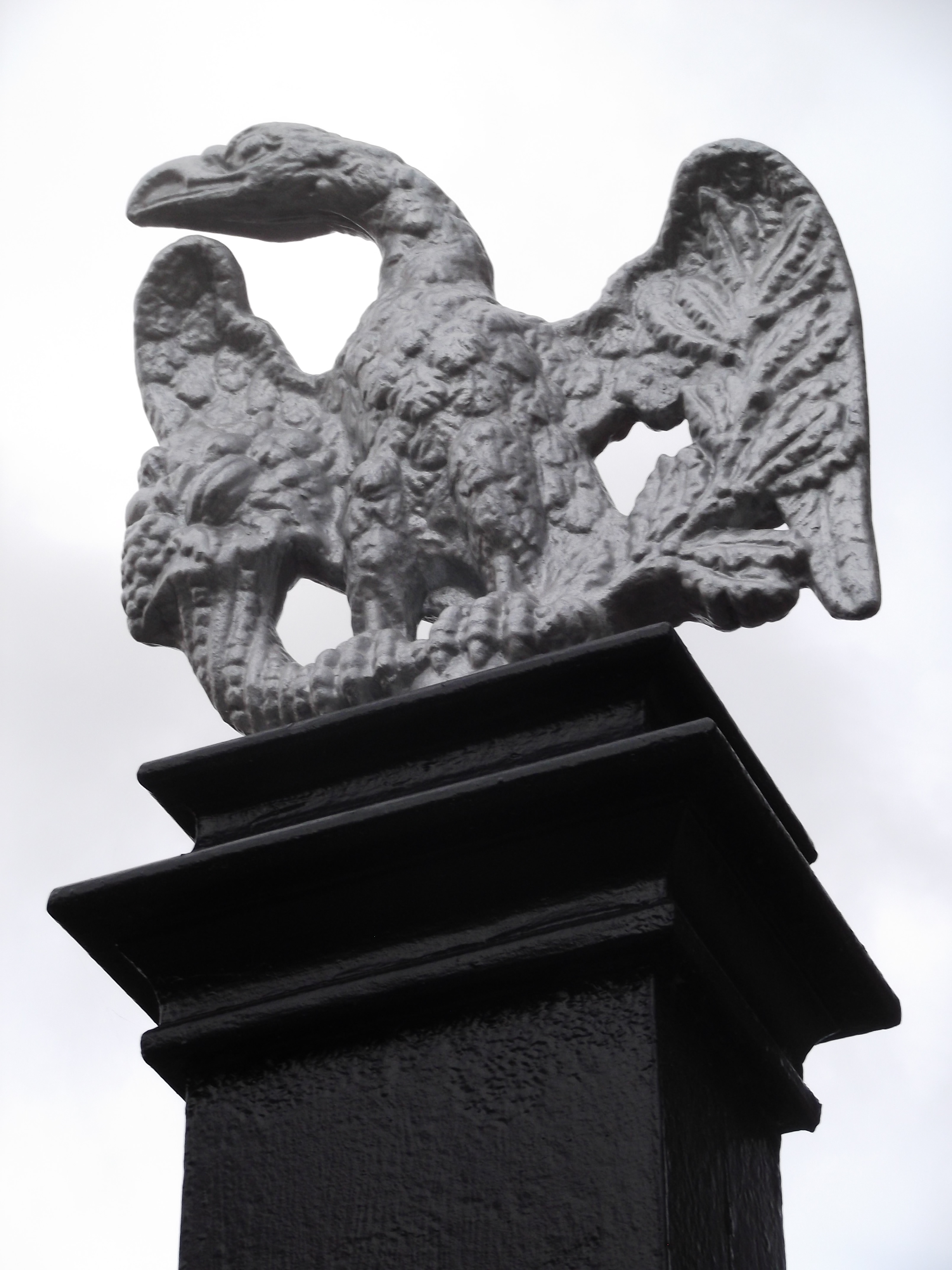
Eagle sculpture on top of a gatepost of the former Eagle Ironworks on Juxon Street.

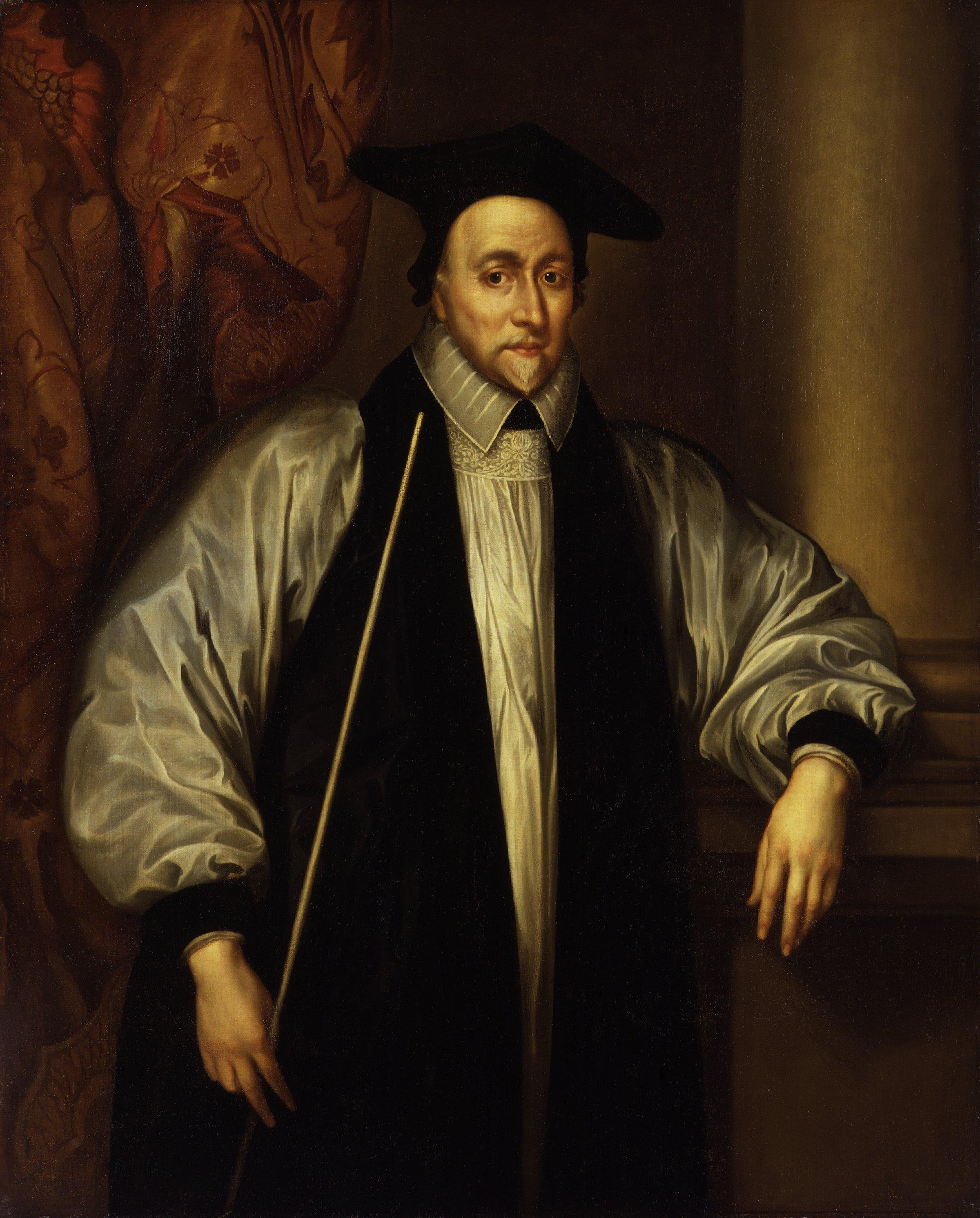
William Juxon (1582–1663), President of St John's College, Oxford and Archbishop of Canterbury, after whom Juxon Street was named.
