= Eagle Ironworks, Oxford =

United Kingdom

Coordinates: 51°45′40.4″N 1°16′14.3″W

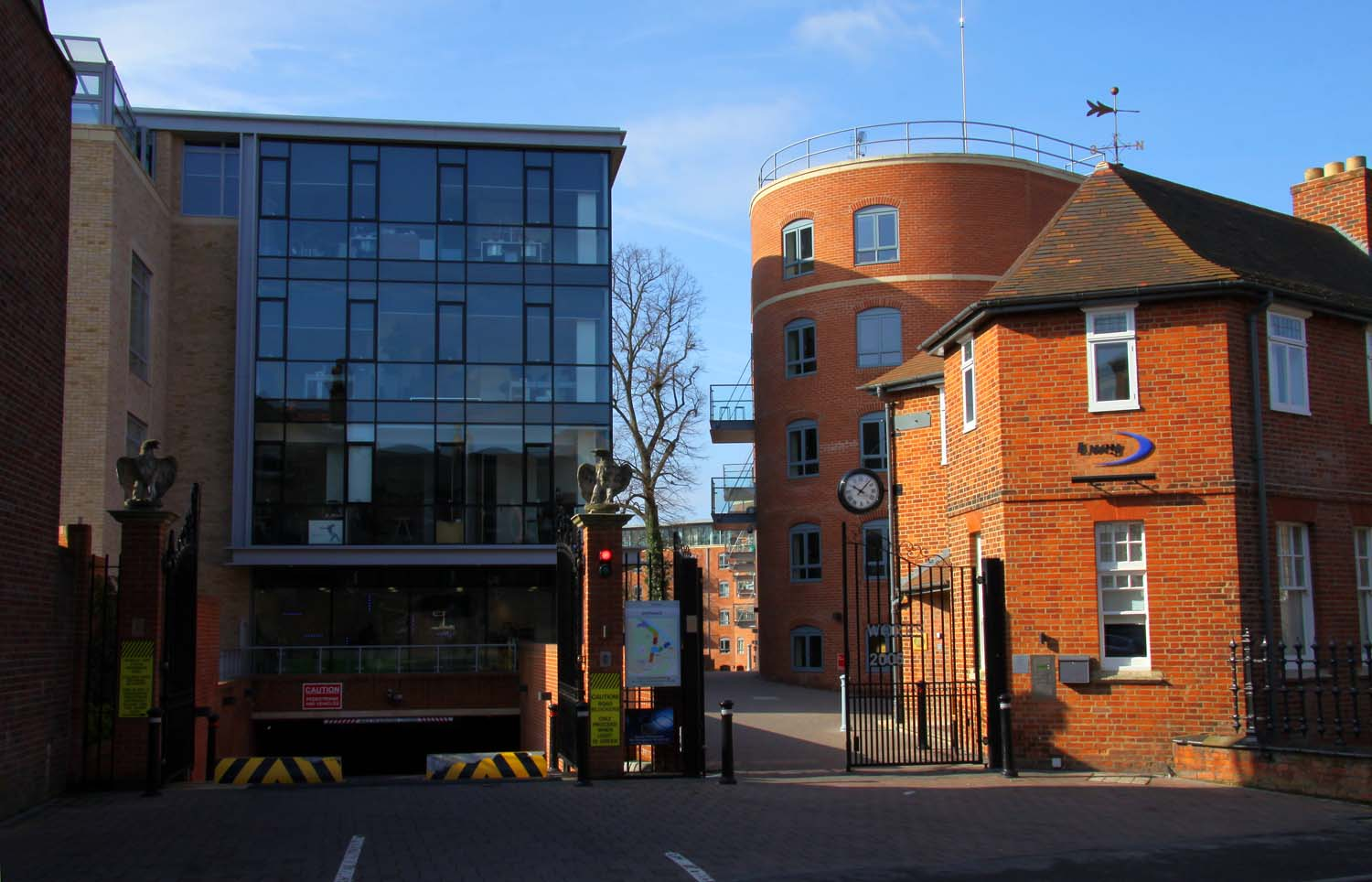
Gateway to the former Lucy's Eagle Ironworks on Walton Well Road in Oxford.

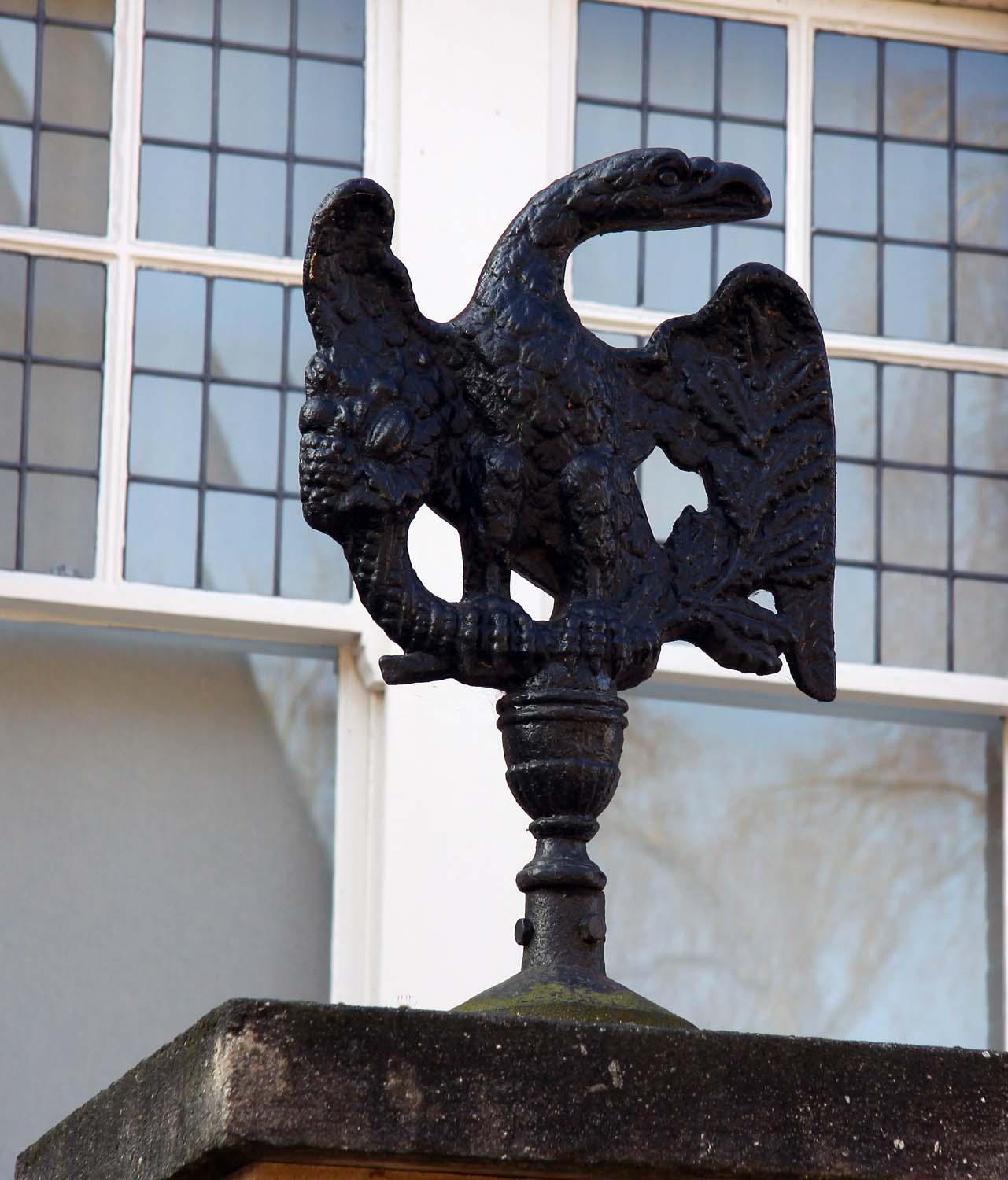
Iron eagle on a gatepost at the former Eagle Ironworks.

The Eagle Ironworks was an ironworks owned by W. Lucy & Co. on the Oxford Canal in Jericho, Oxford, England. William Carter founded the works in 1812 with a shop in the High Street and moved it to its site beside the canal in 1825. It was on Walton Well Road at the northern end of Walton Street and backed onto St Sepulchre's Cemetery. The works ceased production in 2005, was demolished in 2007 and has since been redeveloped, mainly with apartments.

== History ==
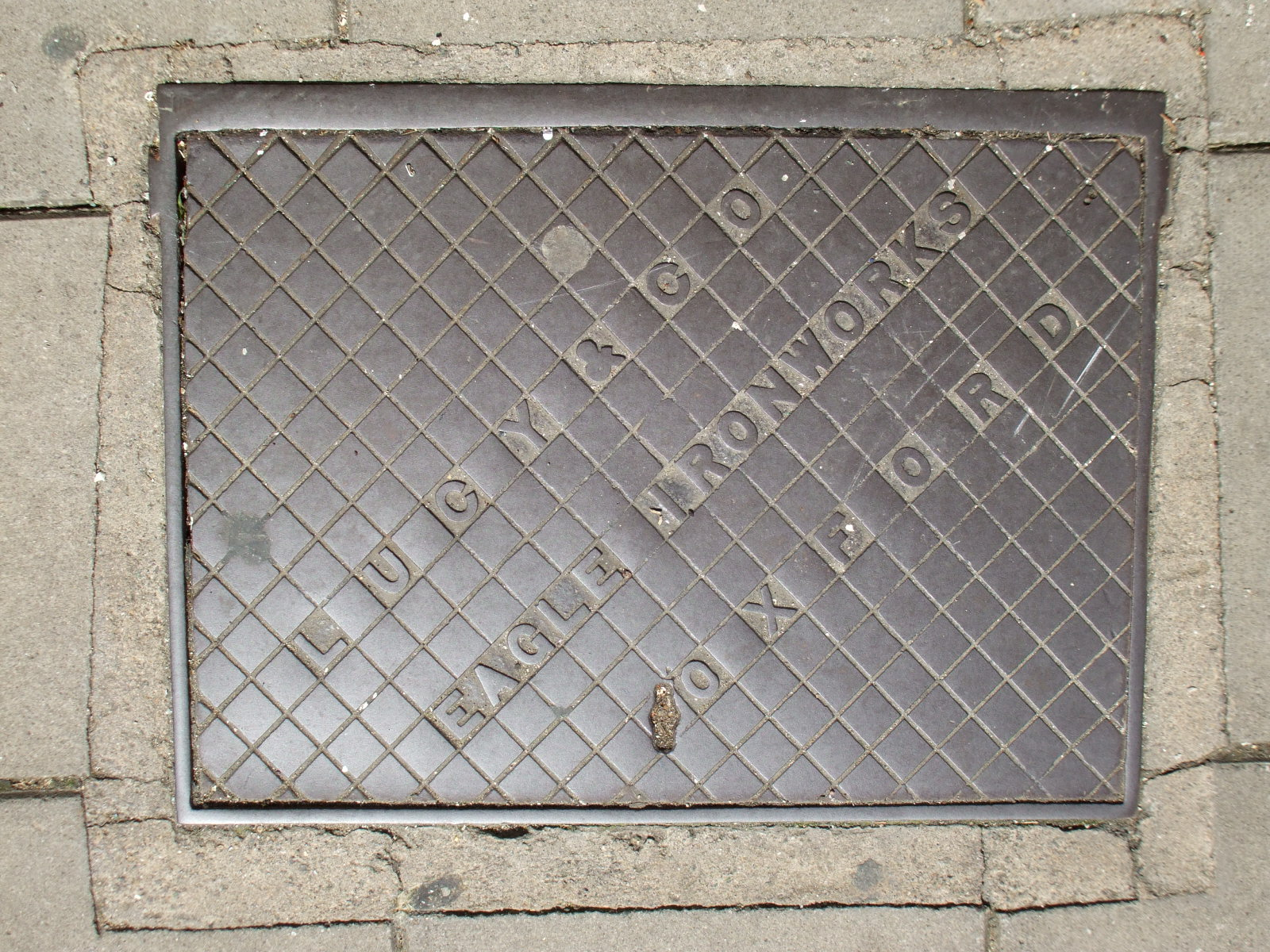
A utility plate in Beaumont Street bearing the name Lucy & Co.

William Carter had an ironmongery shop in High Street, Oxford by 1812, when he founded an iron foundry in Summertown which was then a rural location north of Oxford. He moved the foundry to the banks of the Oxford Canal in 1825, one of the first developments in what is now the district of Jericho in central Oxford. The company specialised in iron castings including lamp-posts, manhole covers, ornamental ironwork and agricultural machinery. William Grafton became a partner and in 1830 Carter moved to the Eagle Foundry in Leamington Hastings, Warwickshire. Grafton continued to manage the foundry in Oxford, which became called the Eagle Ironworks. In 1854 the company bought the freehold for the site from St John's College, which owned much of north Oxford. When Grafton died in 1861, William Lucy, his partner, took over the running of the foundry. When he in turn died in 1873, the name of the ironworks became "Lucy's".

The growth of North Oxford and the University of Oxford colleges in the Victorian era expanded Lucy's market. The company responded by adding a new smith shop and foundry to the Eagle Ironworks, designed by local architect William Wilkinson and completed in 1879. Lucy's became a limited company in 1897. It expanded both its product range and its market, including shelving and storage equipment that it sold throughout the country. In the decade after becoming a limited company, Lucy's accordingly increased and diversified the Eagle Ironworks buildings, including a north-lit factory extension designed by George Gardiner and completed in 1901.

Production changed to electrical engineering and stainless steel, including arc lamps, electric lamp fittings, steam roller castings and, appropriately for Oxford, library stacking. In both World War I and World War II Lucy's made munitions. Between the wars it concentrated on electrical engineering and making switchgear. After World War II it also made machine tools.

== Closure and redevelopment ==
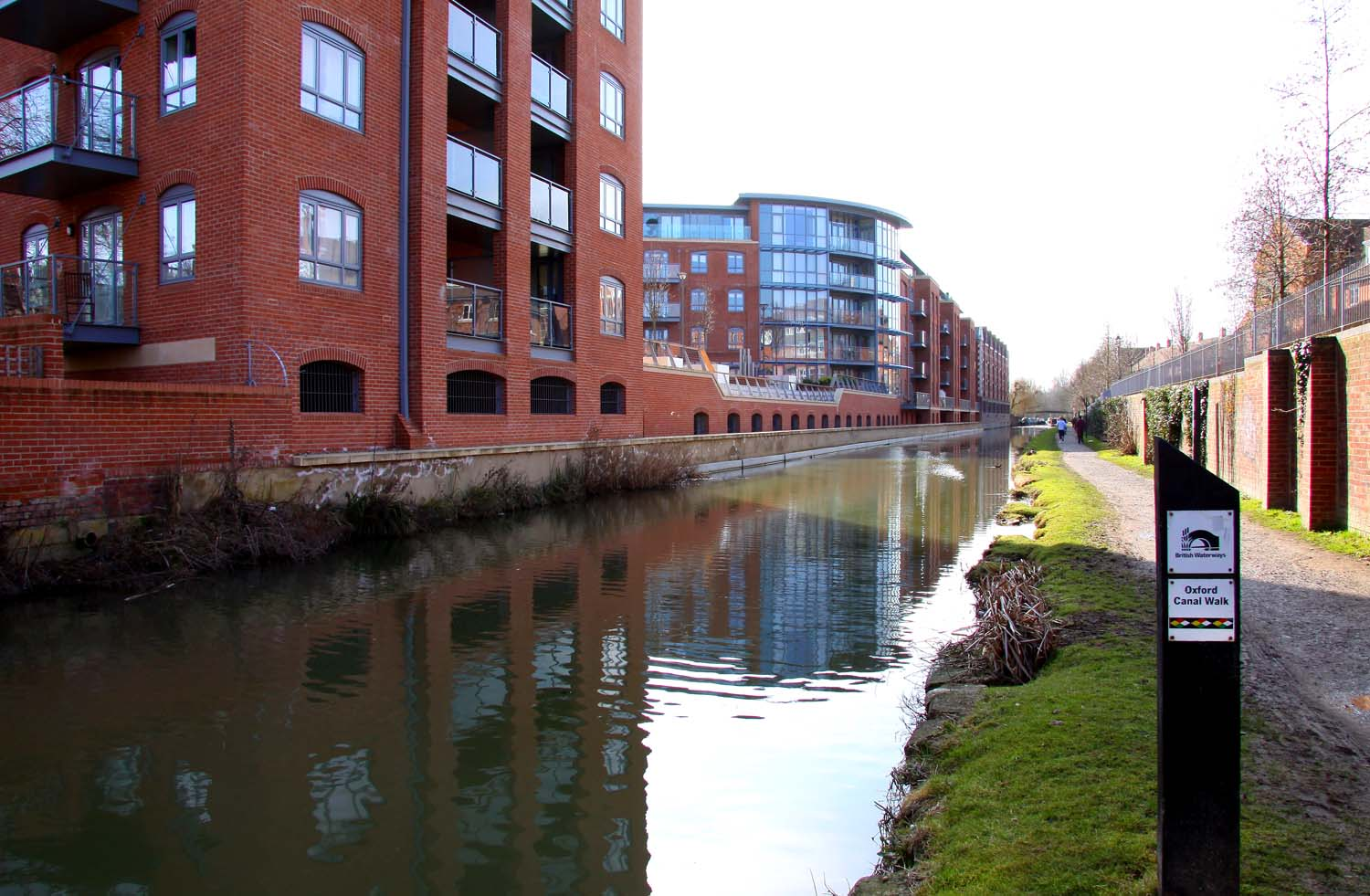
The Oxford Canal from Walton Well Road in 2010. The modern apartments by the canal to the left have replaced the former Lucy's Ironworks.

In the 1960s the company built two large blocks on its wharves by the canal. In 2005 the company's new US owners moved manufacturing overseas from the United Kingdom and in 2007 it demolished the Eagle Ironworks and redeveloped the site with apartment blocks, which it lets out directly to tenants, trading as Lucy Properties. This has been controversial for town planning reasons.

In 2006, the site's archaeology was evaluated prior to redevelopment. During the archaeological excavations a 17th-century pit and a possible 19th-century well were found. A new residential road, William Lucy Way, was developed at this time, on the other side of the Canal from the original Lucy's site.

== Literature ==
Early in the 20th century the poet and short story writer A. E. Coppard (1878–1957) worked at the Eagle Ironworks, as recounted in his autobiography It's Me, O Lord!

Oxford-based author Philip Pullman featured the Eagle Ironworks in his 2003 novel Lyra's Oxford. The story includes a fictitious "Randolph Lucy", a 17th-century alchemist with an eagle-demon who had his laboratory on nearby Juxon Street. An entry for the Eagle Ironworks is included in an extract from a fictitious version of the Baedeker guide.

== See also ==
- Littleworth Mill, Wheatley, supplied by the Eagle Ironworks in 1784.
- W. Lucy & Co.

== Sources and further reading ==
- Andrews, Philip W. S.; Brunner, Elizabeth (1965). The Eagle Ironworks Oxford: The story of W. Lucy and Company Limited. London: Mills & Boon.
- Davies, Mark; Robinson, Catherine (2003) [2001]. A Towpath Walk in Oxford. Oxford: Oxford Towpath Press. ISBN 0-9535593-1-9.
- Woolley, Liz (2010). "Industrial Architecture in Oxford, 1870 to 1914". Oxoniensia. LXXV. Oxfordshire Architectural and Historical Society: 67–96. ISSN 0308-5562.
