= Oxfordshire Artweeks =

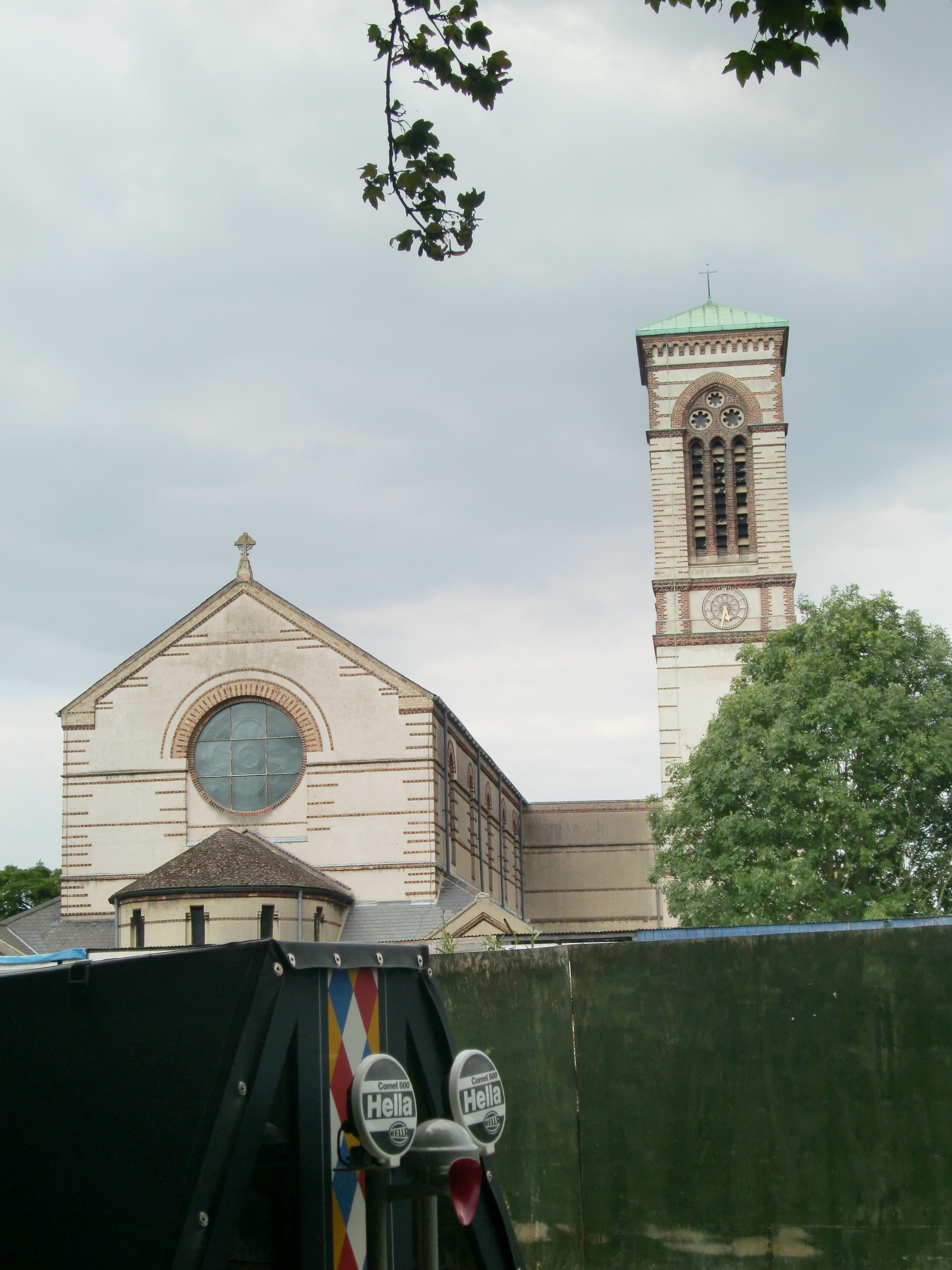
St Barnabas Church, Oxford, one of the venues of Oxfordshire Artweeks

Oxfordshire Artweeks is an annual art festival held in Oxfordshire, England for three weeks each May.

Exhibitions are held in the city of Oxford, south Oxfordshire, and north Oxfordshire, for a week each on consecutive weeks. Venues vary from houses of local artists to art galleries such as Art Jericho. The festival was established in 1981.
