= Jericho, Oxford =

Suburb of Oxford, England

Coordinates: 51.759°N 1.268°W

Jericho
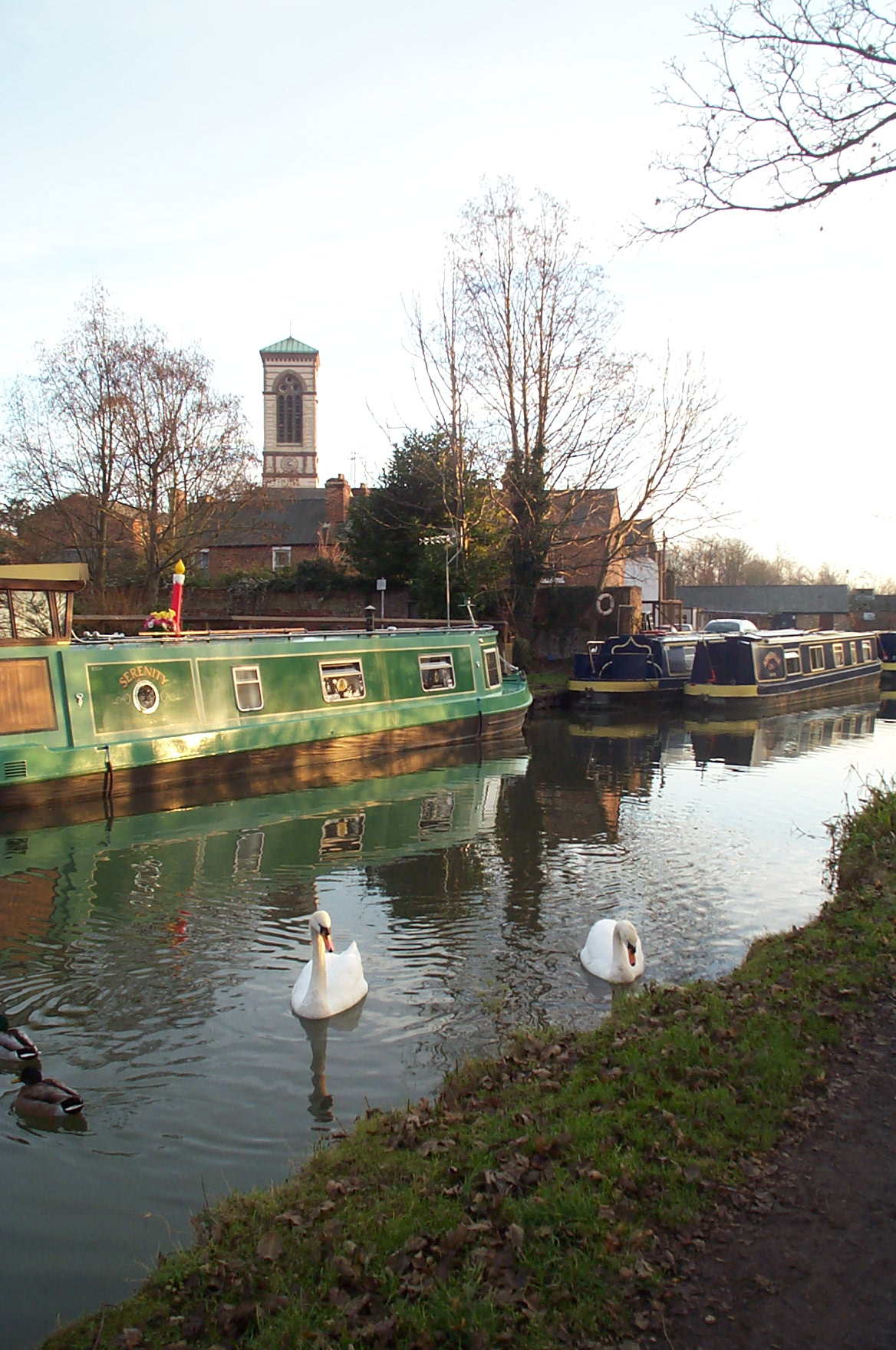
- Jericho and the tower of St Barnabas Church seen from the Oxford Canal

- Jericho shown within Oxford Location within Oxfordshire
- OS grid reference: SP504069
- Civil parish: unparished
- District: Oxford
- Shire county: Oxfordshire
- Region: South East
- Country: England
- Sovereign state: United Kingdom
- Post town: Oxford
- Postcode district: OX2
- Dialling code: 01865
- Police: Thames Valley
- Fire: Oxfordshire
- Ambulance: South Central
- UK Parliament: Oxford West and Abingdon
- Website: Oxford City Council

Jericho is a historic suburb of the English city of Oxford. It consists of the streets bounded by the Oxford Canal, Worcester College, Walton Street and Walton Well Road. Located outside the old city wall, it was originally a place for travellers to rest if they had reached the city after the gates had closed. The name Jericho may have been adopted to signify this 'remote place' outside the wall. As of February 2021, the population of the Jericho and Osney wards was 6,995.

== History ==
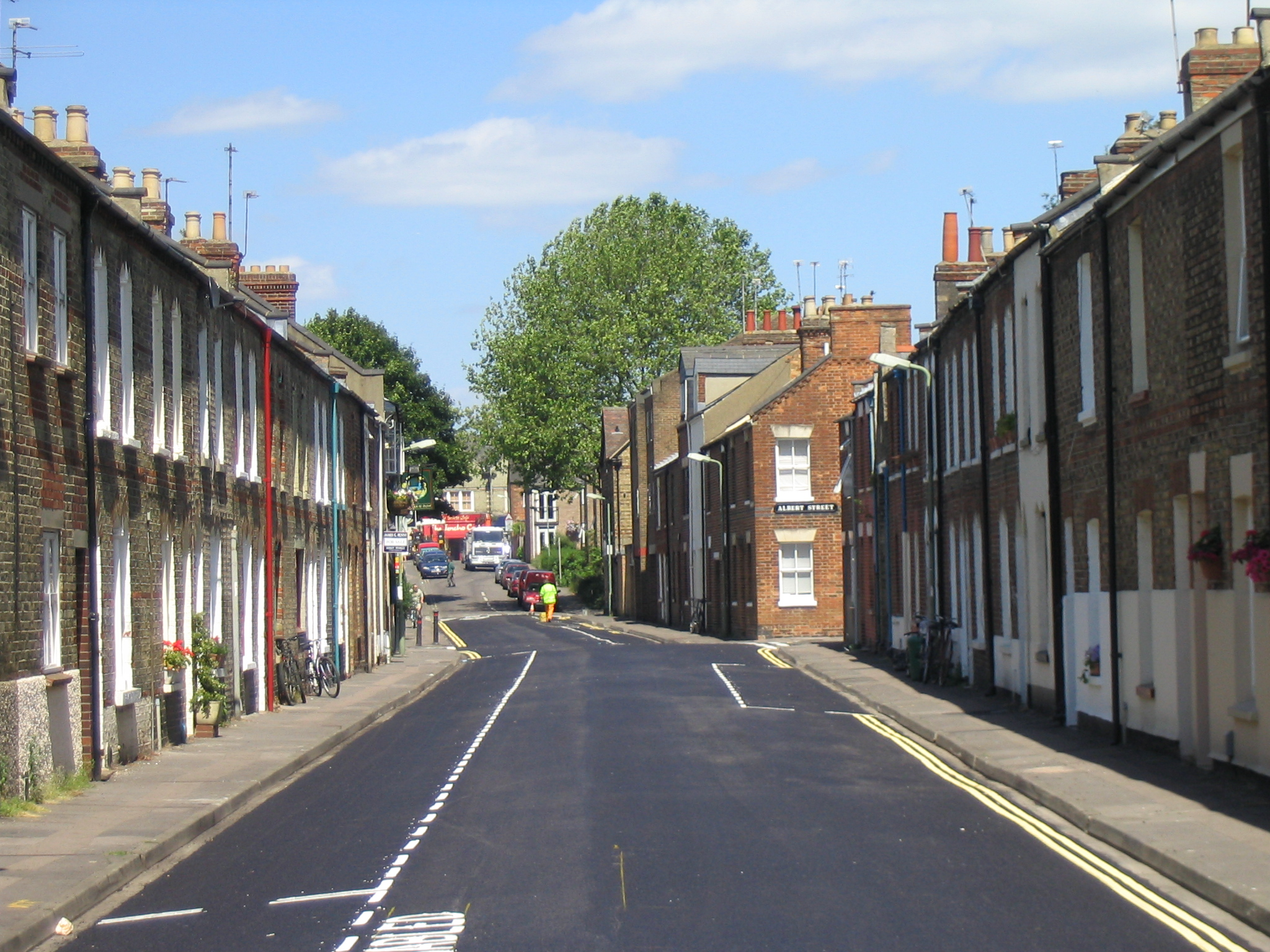
Cranham Street, looking east

Originally an industrial area, Jericho grew because of its proximity to the Oxford Canal, which arrived in 1790. The Eagle Ironworks (now redeveloped into apartments), wharves, and the Oxford University Press were based there and its residential streets are mostly 'two-up, two-down' Victorian workers' houses. With back streets of 19th-century terraced housing and many restaurants, it has become a popular area for student and London commuter accommodation.

In the latter half of the 19th Century flooding, caused by low-lying land and poor drainage, combined with open sewers and overcrowding resulted in deaths from diseases such as typhoid and dysentery, with five out of eleven typhoid deaths in 1873 originating from Jericho. Jericho residents also accounted for twenty two cases of cholera during the 1832 epidemic.

In the 1950s, Jericho was briefly a red light area, and in the early 1960s, there were plans to demolish it and replace it with light industrial units and new housing. However, many people objected and campaigned to save this historic area, rallied by local city councillor Olive Gibbs and the Jericho Residents Association. As a result, the plans were changed. Houses beyond repair were demolished, but many others were upgraded in the late 1960s and early 1970s with the help of council grants. This encouraged many young professionals and families to move in; subsequently, Jericho became one of Oxford's most sought-after areas. Large council and social housing developments were built in the 1970s and 1980s.

== Community ==
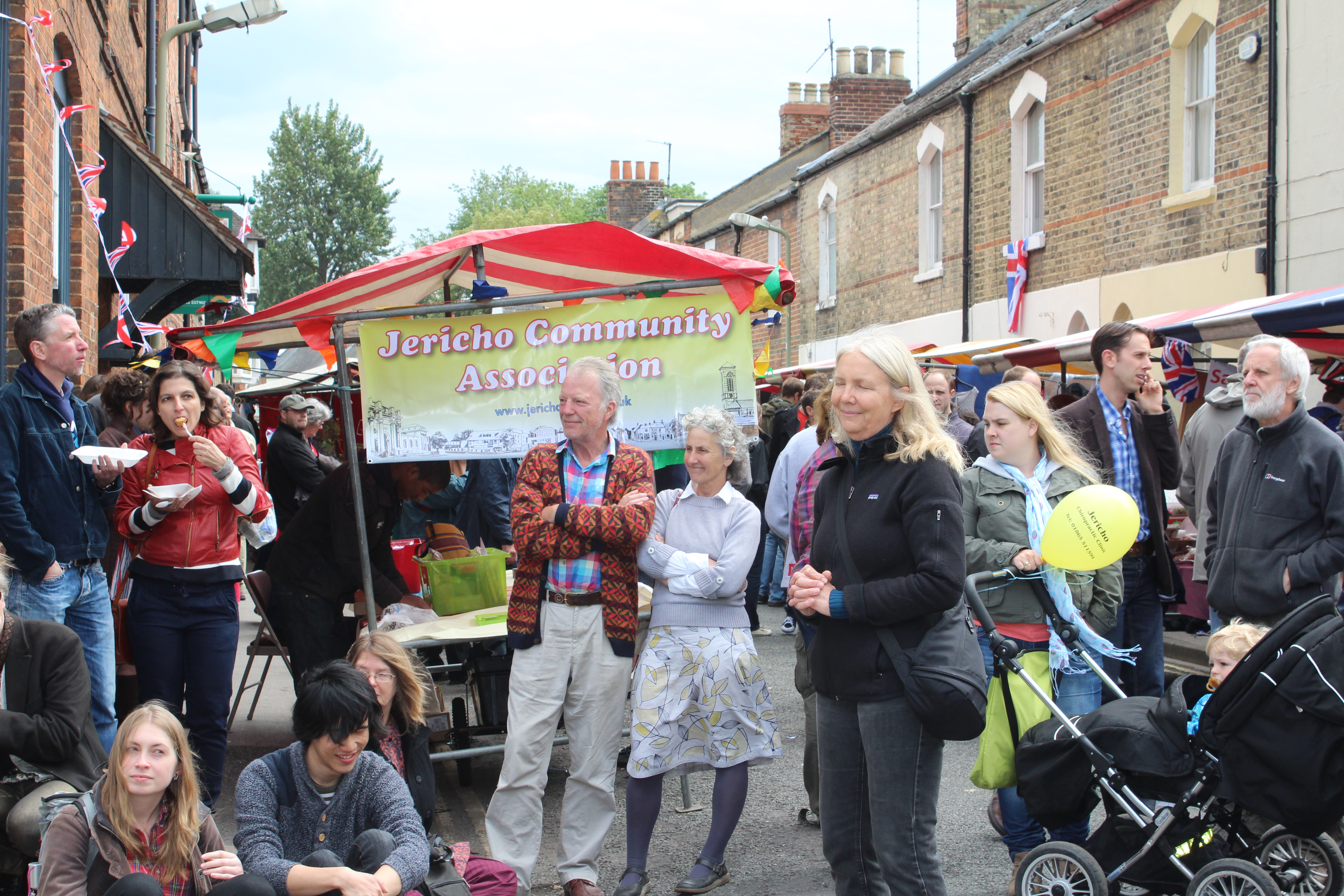
Jericho Street Fair

Jericho retains a strong community spirit. The Jericho Community Association runs the Jericho Community Centre in Canal Street, maintains the community website, Jericho Online, and organises the annual Jericho Street Fair which is held in mid-June each year, around the feast day of the patron saint Barnabas (11 June). It is also the focus for other community activities and has been very active in campaigning for responsible development of the canal-side land, which is the site of the former Jericho Wharf. Successive owners or developers have failed to provide any viable plans, and therefore the site remains derelict to this day

Jericho is served by a Church of England primary school, St Barnabas Primary School, a large primary school where over 50% speak English as a second language. Since 2011, parents and teaching staff from the parent-teacher association (PTA) at the school have organised a multi-terrain run called Run Jericho, which takes place in June every year. Run Jericho features a 1-mile children's fun run, 5-km and 10-km runs through Worcester College, the streets of Jericho, Port Meadow, Wolvercote, and along the Thames River path. This is the largest fundraising event for St Barnabas Primary School, with a message of inclusivity, encouraging healthy living, and strengthening community ties. Since 2023, St Barnabas Primary School, St Barnabas Church, and the Jericho Community Association have joined efforts to create Jericho Fest with the Jericho Street Fair, Run Jericho, and St Barnabas Day Mass all occurring in the same weekend in June.

Appropriately for its biblical name, Jericho is also known for its places of worship. The Church of England parish church is the Anglo-Catholic St Barnabas Church, next to the Oxford Canal. St Sepulchre's Cemetery lies off Walton Street, which has no associated church and has lost its chapel. The Albert Street Chapel (Reformed Baptist) is also in the neighbourhood. The Oxford Synagogue (one of the few in England with more than one denomination of Judaism worshipping in the same house) and the Oxford Jewish Centre are in Jericho.

Castlemill Boatyard was established as a coal wharf by the 1840s on the canal in Jericho. It was previously owned by British Waterways and ceased trading in 1992. After its closure, boaters continued to use the site, the remainder of which were evicted in 2006. British Waterways sold the site to a company that subsequently went into administration in 2009. The Jericho Wharf Trust was formed in 2012 to attempt to purchase the land. However, they were outbid by a private company in 2013, which subsequently failed to develop the site. In 2024, the Trust petitioned Oxford City Council to forcibly purchase the land from the current landowner after 25 years of dereliction.

Next to the Castlemill Boatyard was the old ferry house and chain ferry, which allowed access to the South Oxford Canal towpath and then on to Port Meadow and the banks of the River Thames by foot. The ferry has now been replaced by a footbridge and the site is now the College Cruisers Wharf accessed via Combe Road off Canal Street. It is a boat hire base and working boatyard providing for the needs of local and visiting narrow boats. The last and first service stop for essential services for boats before they cruise the River Thames or leave it.

The local cinema has seen a number of incarnations. It started in 1913 as the North Oxford Kinema. In 1925, it was renamed The Scala. In 1970, it was split into two and became Studios 1 and 2, one of which was well-known for showing softcore pornography. In 1977, the cinema revived again after being taken over by the London company Contemporary Entertainments and acquired its current name, the Phoenix, showing first-run and art house films.

In 2017, Jericho was ranked number 11 in a list of the UK’s "most hip" destinations. The ranking was compiled by TravelSupermarket, and took into account vegan cafés, independent bike shops, vinyl record stores, and independent coffee shops. In 2018, the suburb dropped to number 20 on the list, although it scored full marks, for the second year running, in the "creative capital" category, which concerned co-working and creative spaces.

== In popular culture ==
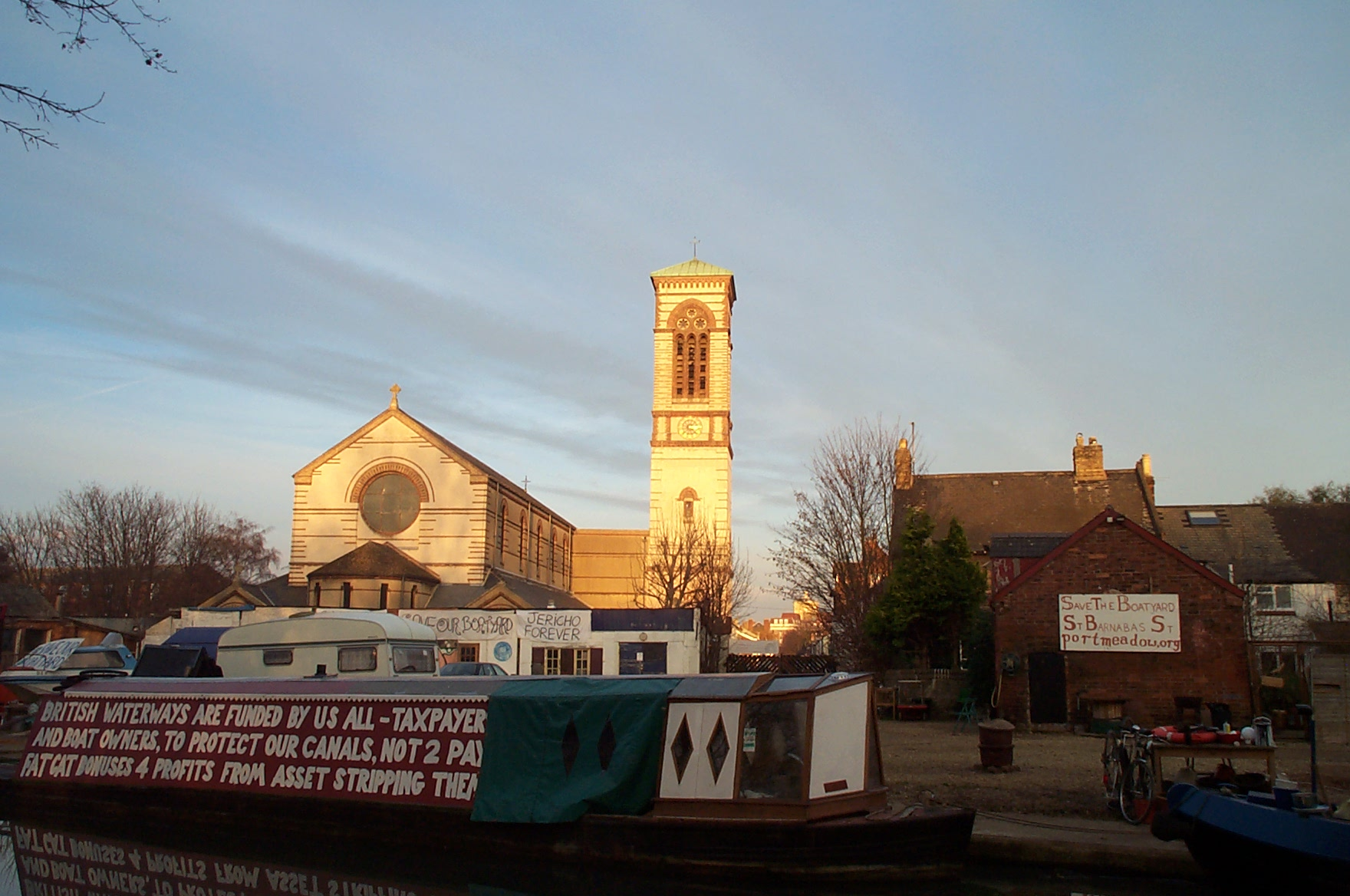
Boaters protest against the proposed sale of the Castle Mill Boatyard on the Oxford Canal, 2005, with St Barnabas Church in the background

Thomas Hardy's novel Jude the Obscure has a scene set in St Barnabas Church, and it is likely that the suburb named "Beersheba" in the novel is based on Jericho. As an homage to Hardy, in 1996, one of Jericho's pubs was renamed Jude the Obscure.

The first episode of the long-running ITV drama series Inspector Morse, starring British actor John Thaw, called "The Dead of Jericho", was partially filmed in the streets of Jericho, notably Combe Road ("Canal Reach" in the drama). It also featured the exterior of the Bookbinders Arms public house on the corner of Victor Street. The spin-off show Lewis also has stories based around the same area.

Philip Pullman set parts of his novels Northern Lights and Lyra's Oxford in Jericho. In the books, Jericho is home to the water-dwelling "Gyptians". He has been a vocal advocate of the residential boaters' fight to save the Castlemill Boatyard.

London-born Australian author Pip Williams' second book, The Bookbinder of Jericho (2023), is set in the then working-class suburb of Jericho. The two main characters – twin sisters Peggy and Maude Jones – work in the bindery at Oxford University Press and live in a narrowboat on Oxford Canal during the period when WWI was breaking out, and the Oxford English Dictionary was being collated and printed.

== Gallery ==
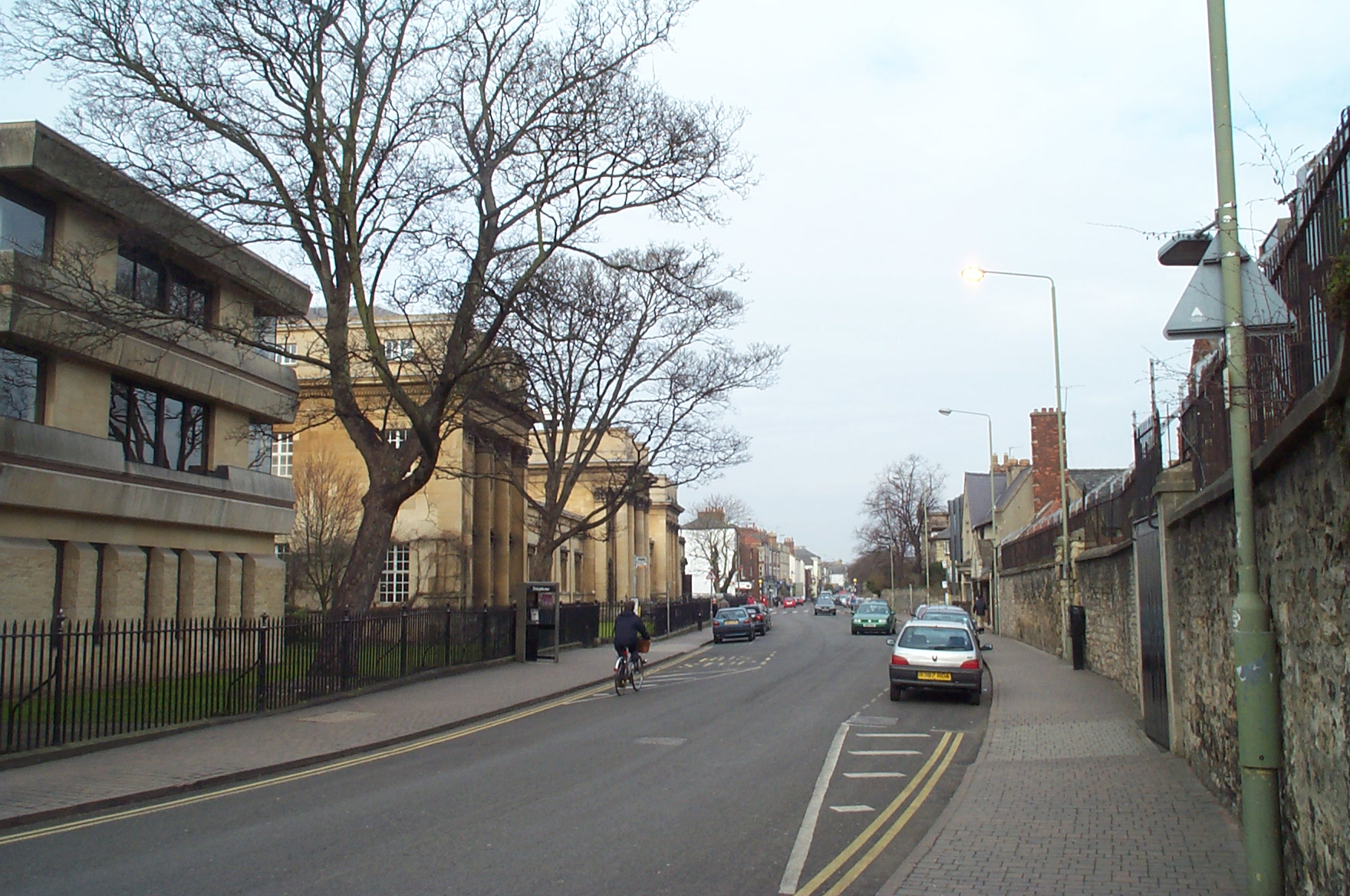
Looking north down Walton Street from the southeast corner of Jericho; Oxford University Press is on the left and Somerville College on the right

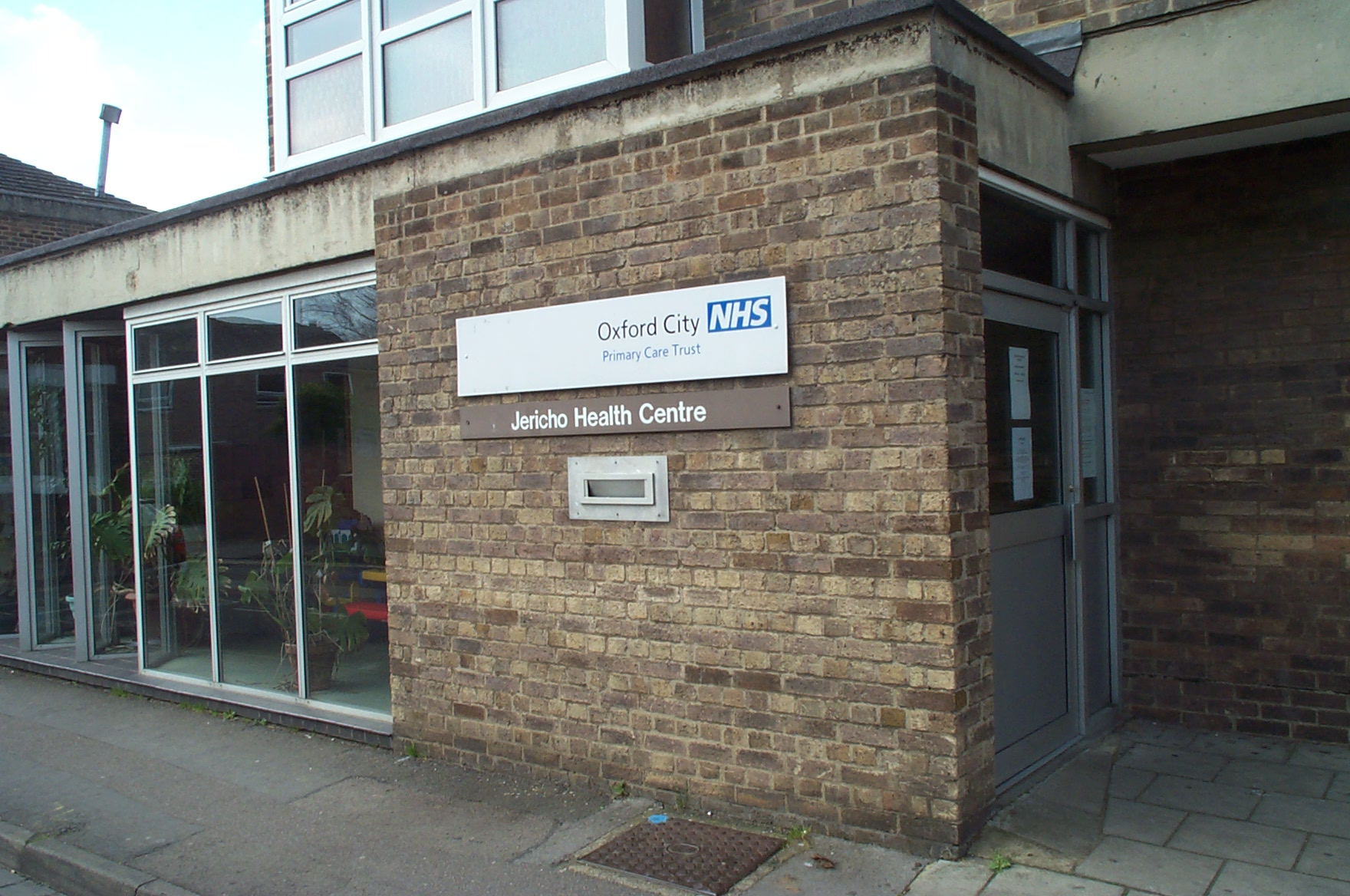
The former Jericho Health Centre on Walton Street, seen in 2005

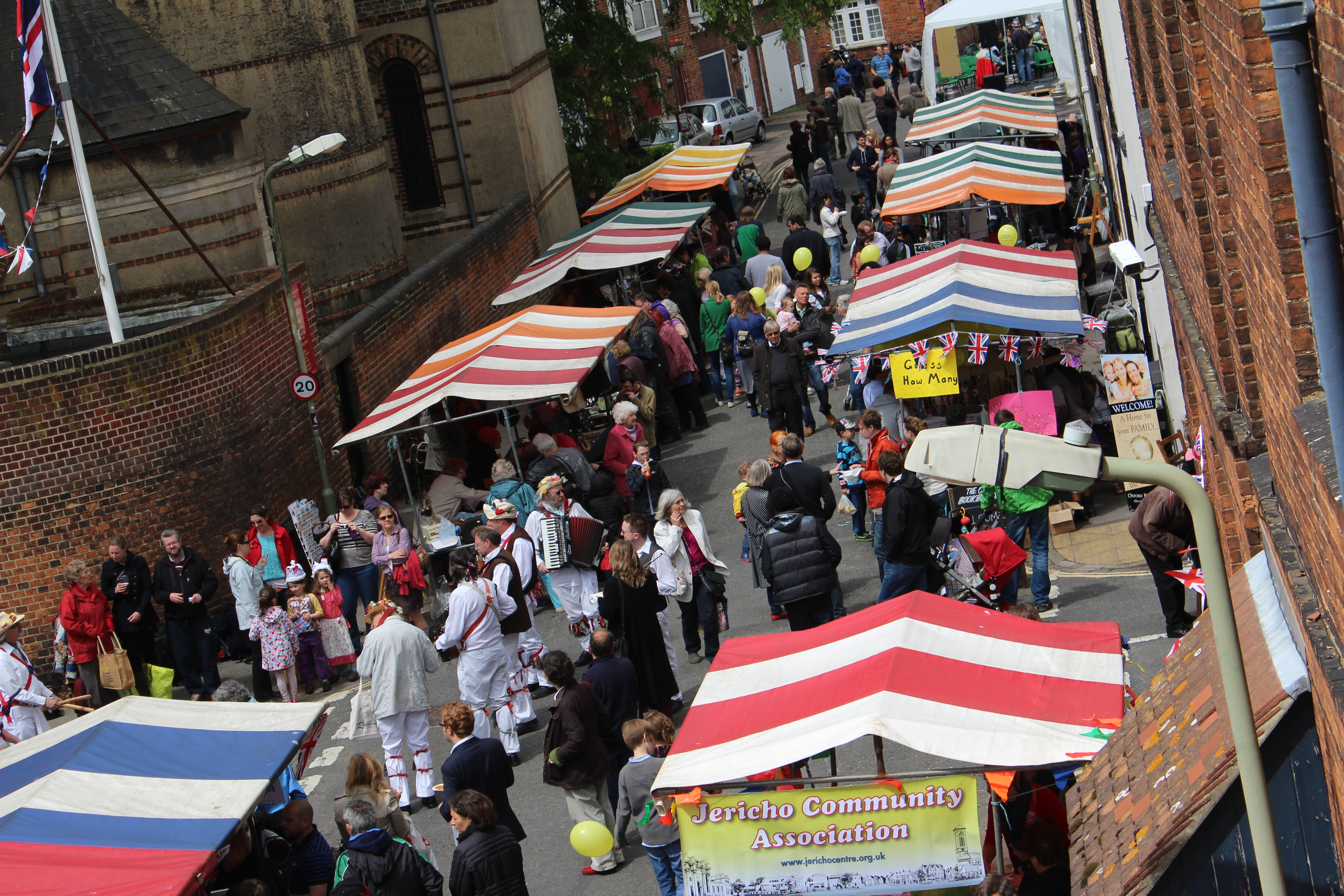
Jericho Street Fair Stalls

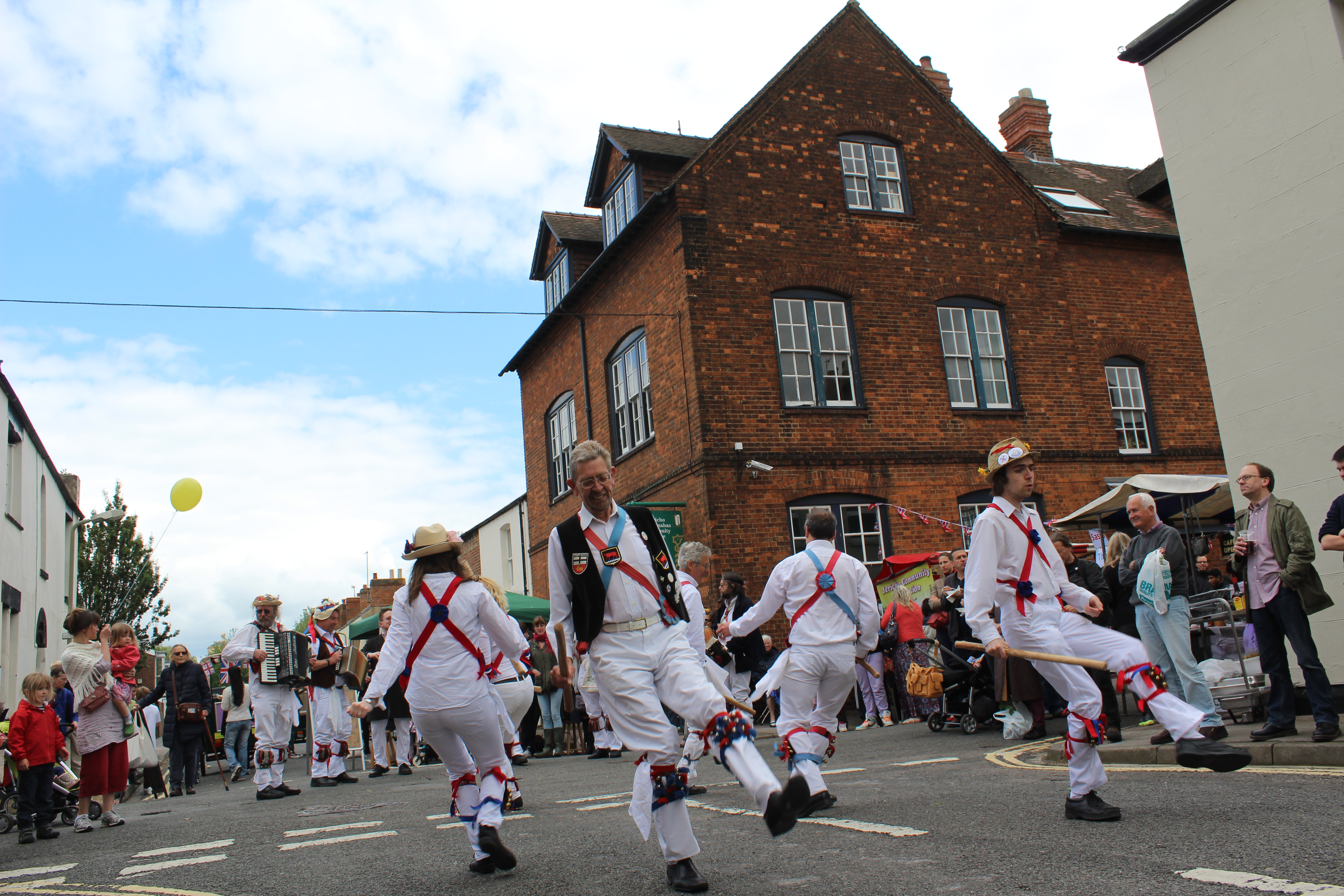
Morris dancers in Cardigan Street

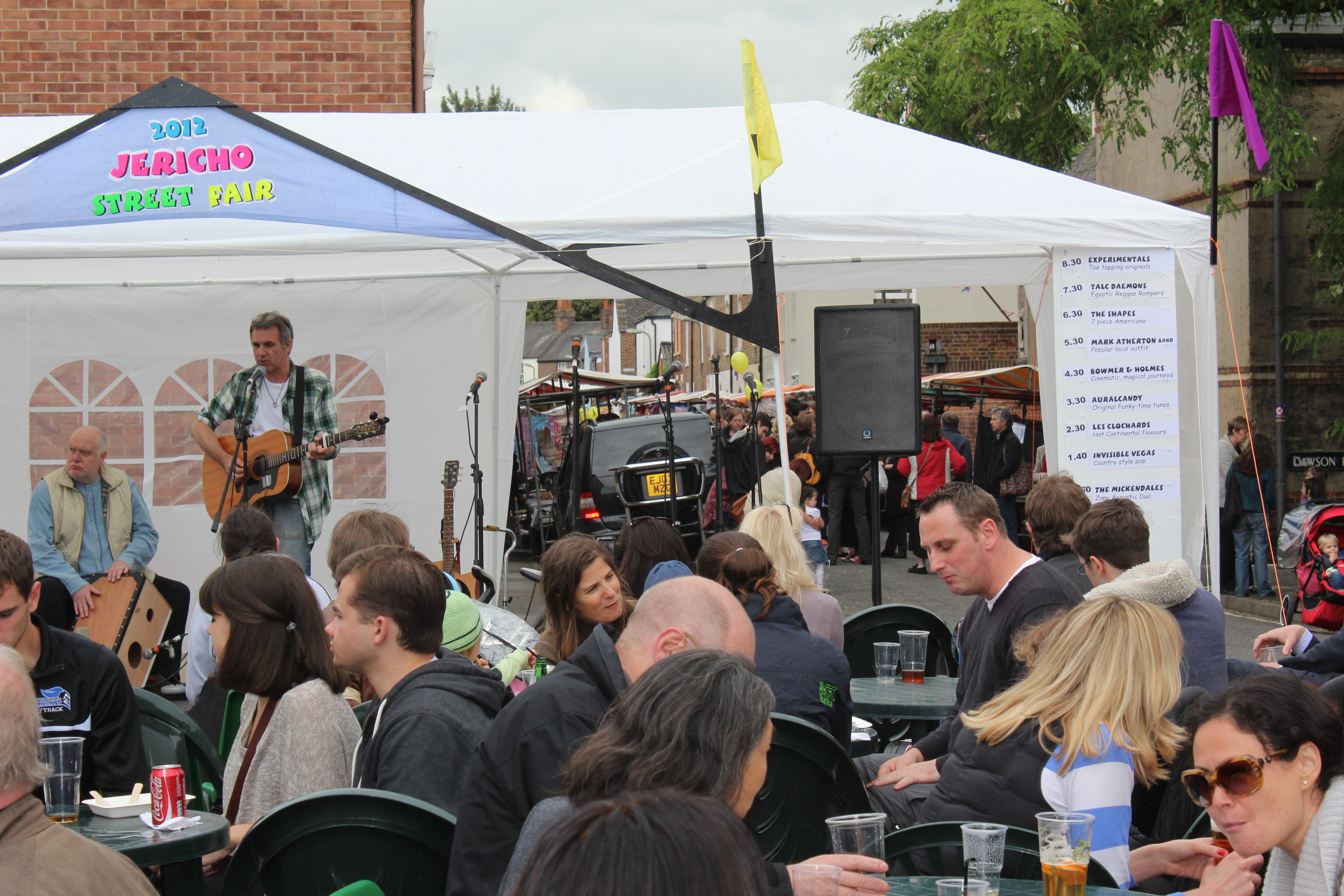
Music outside the Bookbinders pub in Canal Street

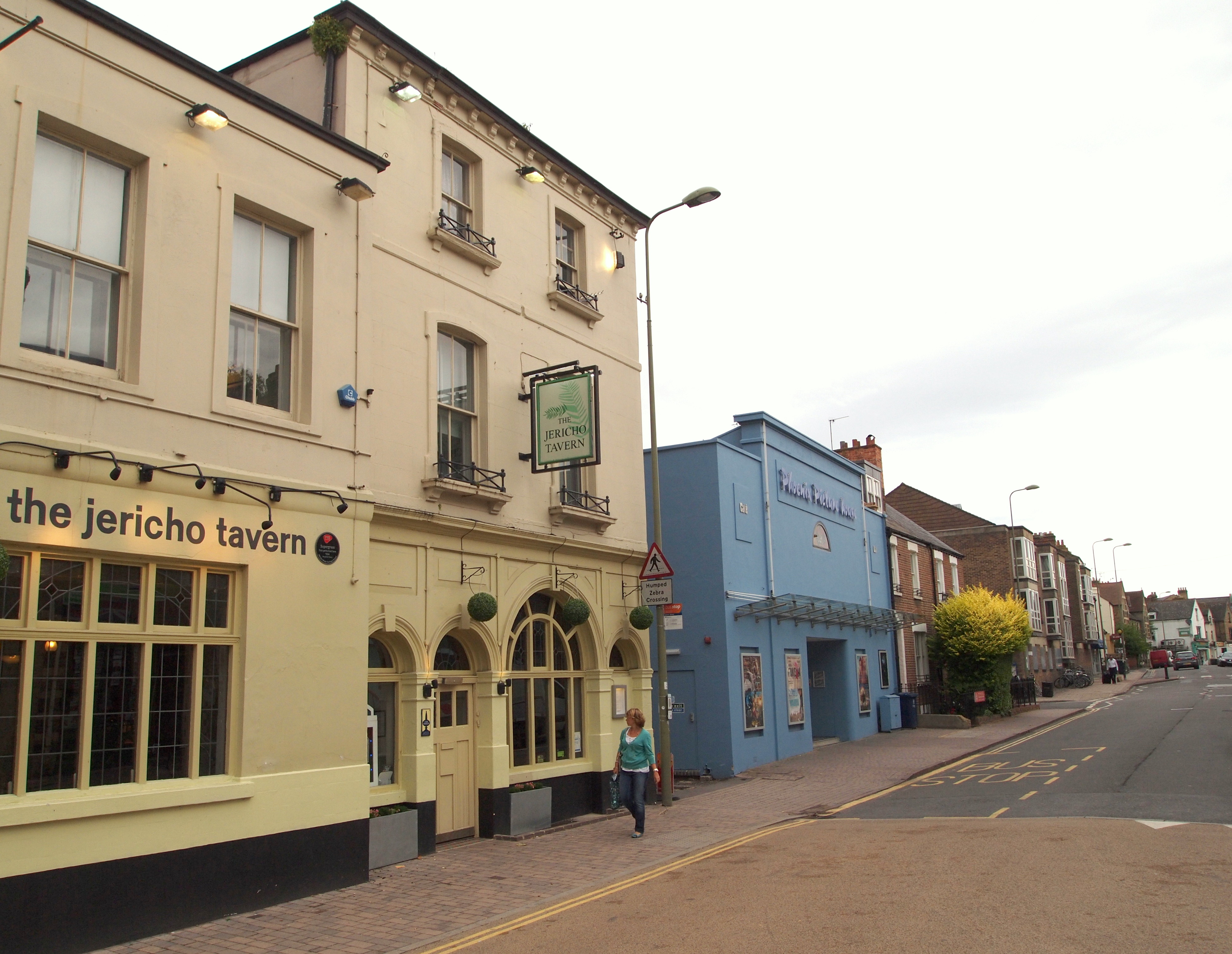
The Jericho Tavern and the Phoenix Picture House

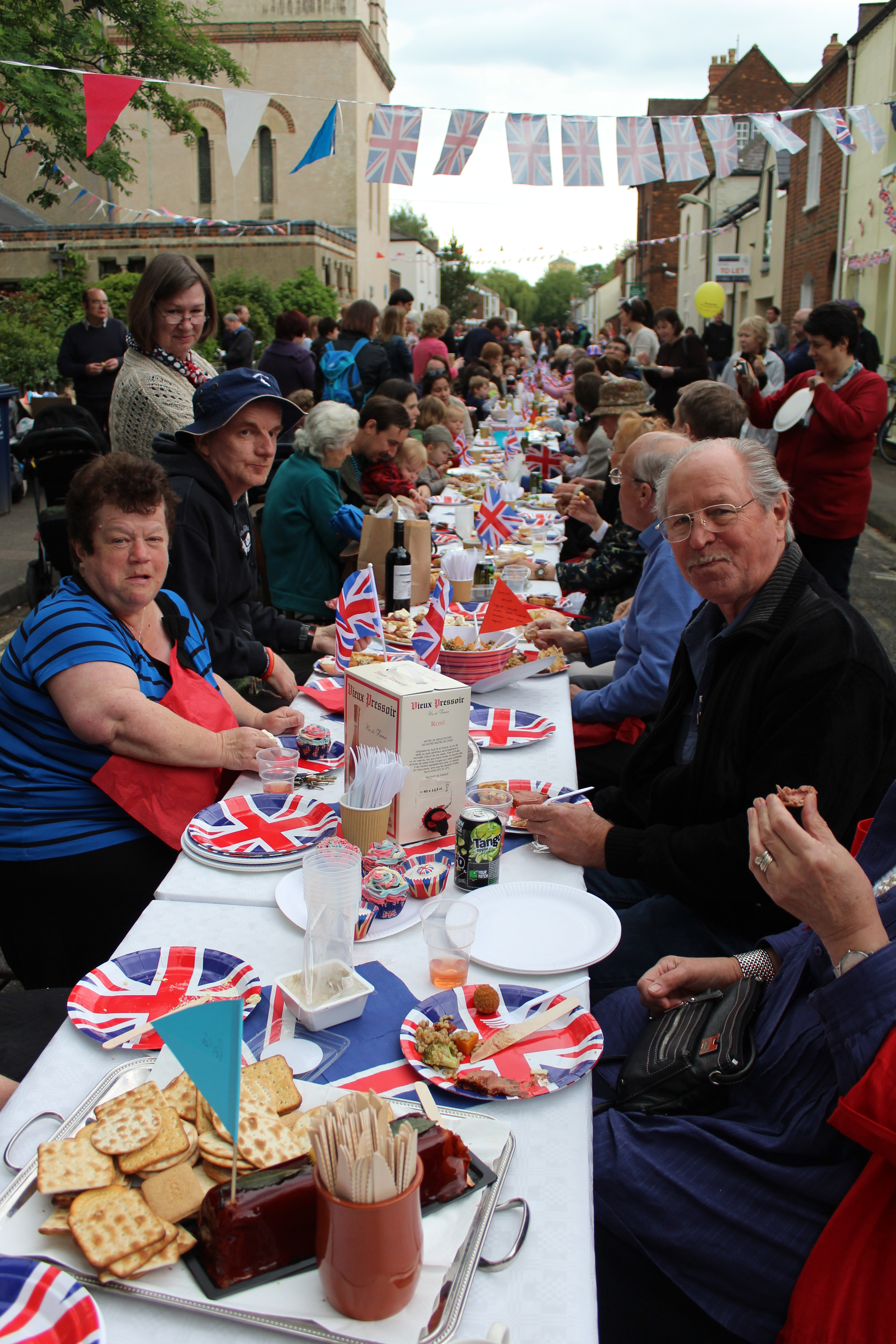
Jubilee Street Party, 2012, in Cardigan Street

== See also ==
- Art Jericho, a contemporary art gallery
- Great Clarendon Street
- Juxon Street

== Sources and further reading ==
- Chance, Eleanor; Colvin, Christina; Cooper, Janet; Day, C.J.; Hassall, T.G.; Selwyn, Nesta (1979). Crossley, Alan; Elrington, C. R. (eds.). Victoria County History: A History of the County of Oxford, Volume 4. London: Institute of Historical Research.
- Curl, James Stevens (1977). The Erosion of Oxford. Oxford Illustrated Press Ltd. pp. 149–162. ISBN 0-902280-40-6.
- Davies, Mark; Muir, John (2022). Andrews, Chris; Muir, John (eds.). Jericho: A Celebration. Oxford: Jericho Co-operative. ISBN 978-1-912584-74-1.
- Davies, Mark; Petts, Valerie (2025). Jericho – A Celebration. Oxford: Jericho Living Heritage Trust. ISBN 978-1-9192019-1-7.
- Kennedy, Julie (1997). The Changing Faces of Jericho, Book One. Witney: Robert Boyd. ISBN 1-899536-14-0.
- Sherwood, Jennifer; Pevsner, Nikolaus (1974). The Buildings of England: Oxfordshire. Harmondsworth: Penguin Books. pp. 289–291. ISBN 0-14-071045-0.
