= St Sepulchre's Cemetery =

Cemetery located in Jericho, Oxford, England

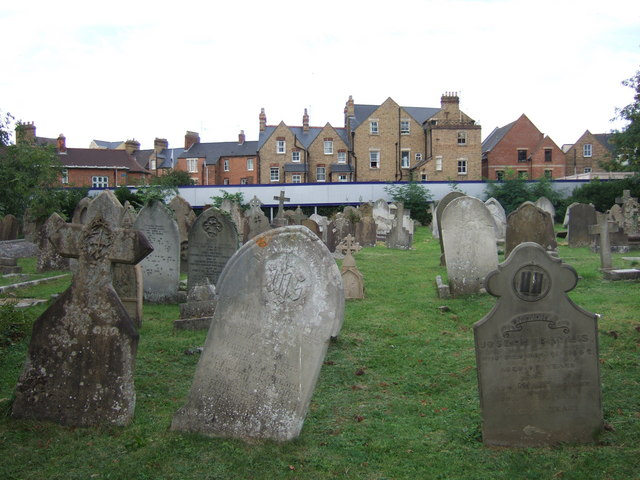
- View of St Sepulchre's Cemetery (facing south)
- Interactive map of St Sepulchre's Cemetery

Details
- Established: 1848
- Location: Jericho, Oxford
- Country: United Kingdom
- Coordinates: 51°45′40″N 1°16′10″W
- Type: Public (closed)
- Website: stsepulchres.org.uk
- Find a Grave: St Sepulchre's Cemetery

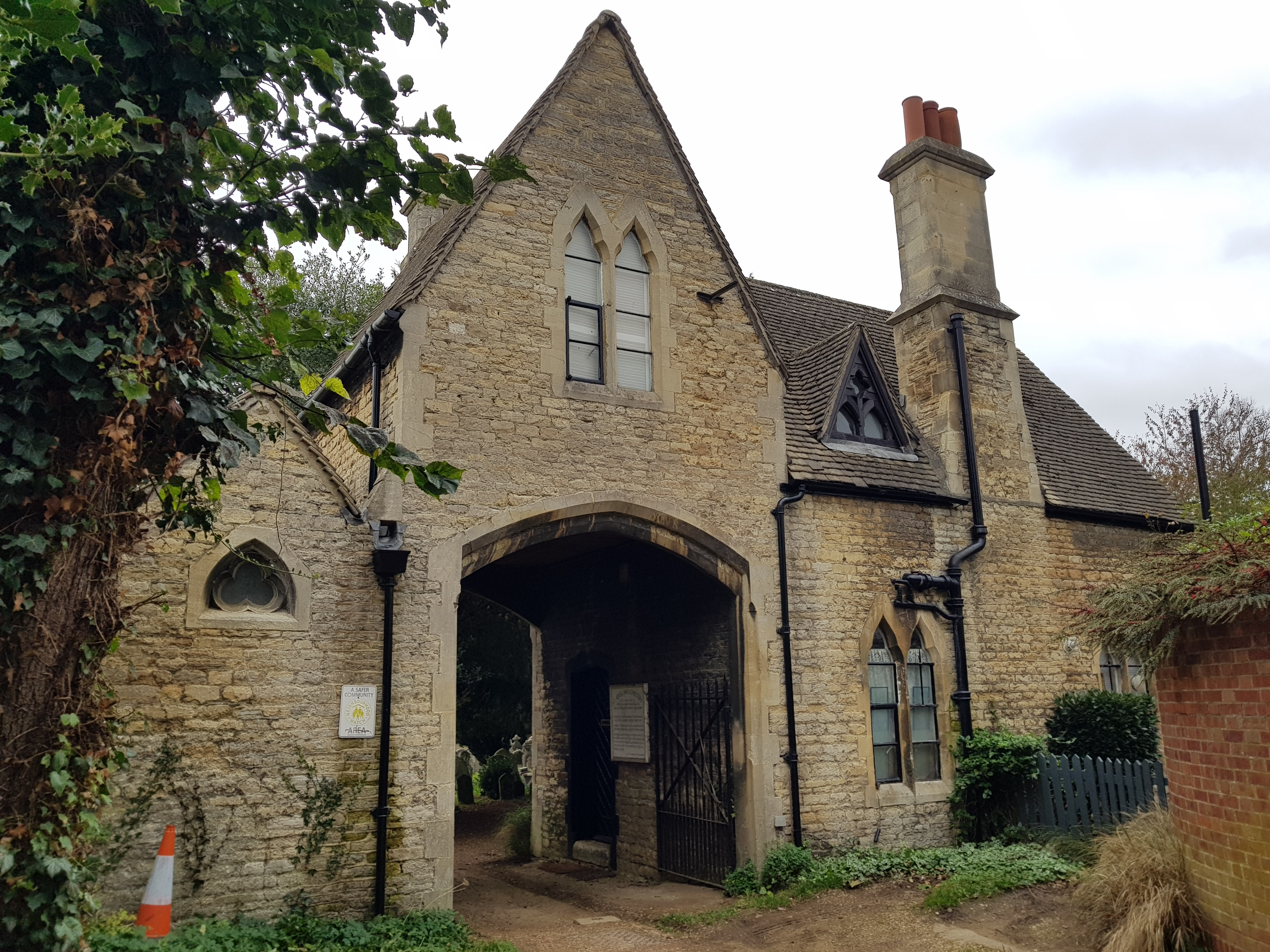
The entrance to St Sepulchre's Cemetery

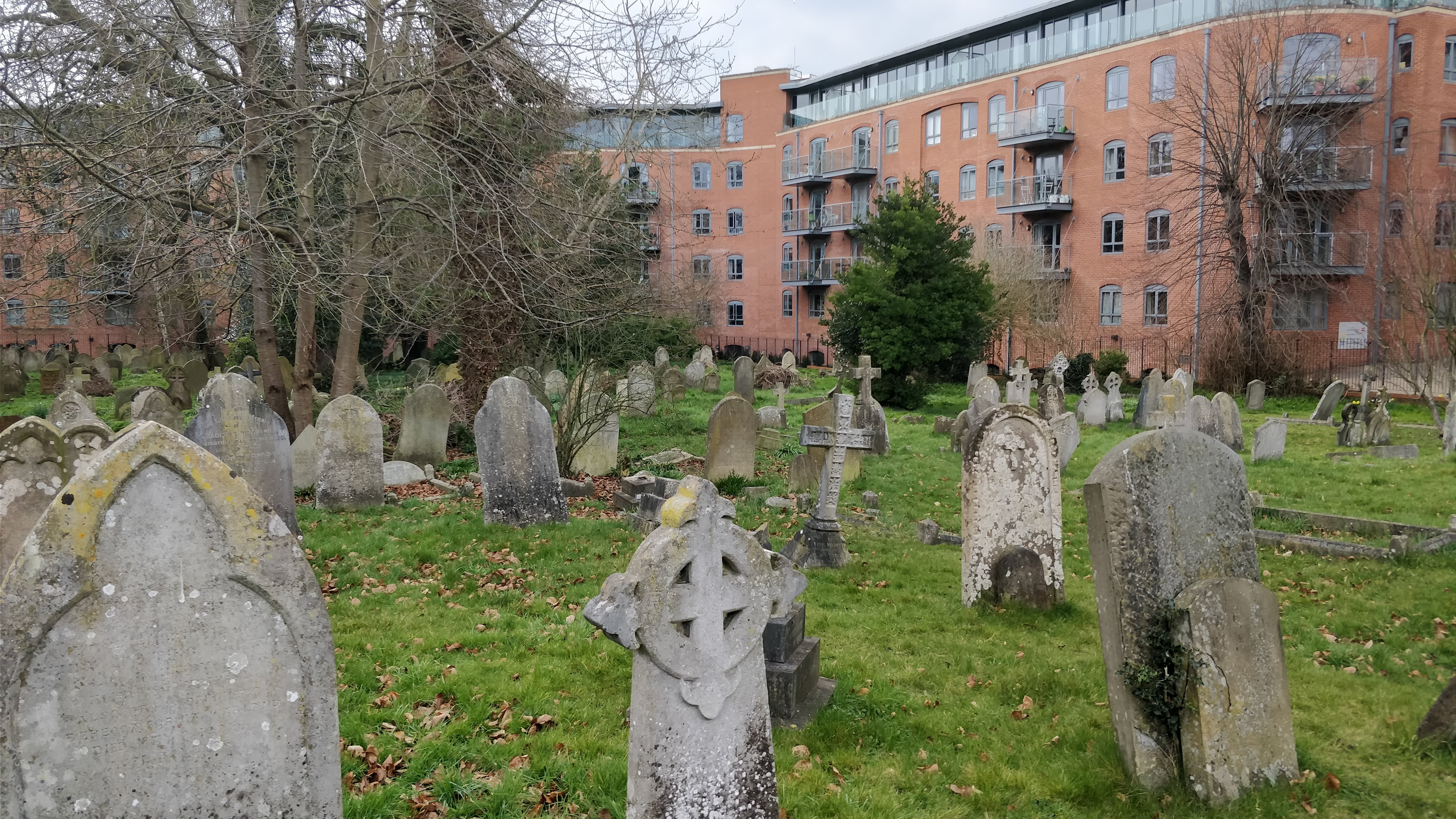
View with new apartment buildings in the background

St Sepulchre's Cemetery is a historic cemetery located on Walton Street, Jericho, central Oxford, England.

The cemetery was opened in 1848 as a cemetery for the Oxford parishes of St Giles, St Michael, and St Mary Magdalen, and the district chapelry of St Paul's Church (which included outlying parts of St Thomas's parish before St Barnabas Church was built). The cemetery was created because all the other existing Oxford cemeteries were overcrowded after many hundreds of years of burials; two other cemeteries, Osney Cemetery and Holywell Cemetery, were also opened at the same time, to cater to the other eight Oxford parishes. In 1855, new burials were forbidden in all Oxford churchyards, with burials only to take place in existing vaults. However, this order seems to have been ignored; by 1887 the cemetery was supposedly so full that bones were littered between graves.

The last new grave was dug in 1944, as St Sepulchre's finally stopped accepting new burials in 1945. The gatehouse lodge, which is owned by Oxford City Council, was let out to tenants, and the chapel was demolished in 1970.

In 2004, St Sepulchre's was added to the Register of Historic Parks and Gardens.

The cemetery was formerly surrounded on two sides by the Eagle Ironworks, which shut down in 2005 and has since been replaced by apartments.

The cemetery is listed Grade II on the Register of Historic Parks and Gardens.

== Notable interments ==
A number of well-known people who have their own Wikipedia pages are buried in the cemetery, including:

- Meta Brevoort, American-British mountain climber
- Bulkeley Bandinel, scholar, ecclesiastic, and librarian
- Frank Arthur Bellamy, astronomer
- Charles William Boase, academic, antiquarian, and librarian
- Edward Caird, Master of Balliol College, Oxford
- John Cavell, proprietor of what was once Oxford's leading department store, Elliston & Cavell, and Mayor of Oxford
- Alfred Christopher, clergyman
- Martha Combe, art collector and patron
- Thomas Combe, an early Superintendent of the Oxford University Press and benefactor of St Barnabas Church, both nearby
- William Alfred Delamotte, painter and printmaker
- Albert Venn Dicey, jurist and constitutional theorist
- Robinson Ellis, classical scholar
- John Farmer, composer, music teacher, and organist
- Thomas Hill Green, philosopher, political radical, and temperance reformer
- John Griffiths, Warden of Wadham College and Keeper of the Oxford University Archives
- Alfred Hackman, sub-librarian at the Bodleian Library, Oxford
- Marian Rebecca Hughes, first woman to take religious vows in the Anglican church since the Reformation
- Herbert Jackson, crammer at the University of Oxford
- Manuel John Johnson, astronomer
- Benjamin Jowett, a Victorian Vice-Chancellor of Oxford University and Master of Balliol College
- Robert Main, astronomer
- William Morfill, first Professor of Russian in Great Britain
- James Bowling Mozley, theologian
- James Adey Ogle, physician
- John Henry Parker, archaeologist, writer on architecture, and publisher
- Henry Francis Pelham, scholar and historian, and Camden Professor of Ancient History at the University of Oxford
- George Uglow Pope, popularly known as Rev. G.U. Pope or just G.U. Pope, a Christian missionary who spent many years in Tamil Nadu and translated many Tamil texts into English
- Stephen Reay, academic and clergyman, Laudian Professor of Arabic at the University of Oxford
- William Riviere, painter and art educator
- Thorold Rogers, economist, historian, and Liberal politician
- Henry John Stephen Smith, mathematician
- Edward James Stone, astronomer
- Guðbrandur Vigfússon, Icelandic scholar
- John O. Westwood, entomologist and archaeologist

== See also ==
- Holywell Cemetery
- Osney Cemetery
- Wolvercote Cemetery
