= Thomas Combe (Millais painting) =

Painting by John Everett Millais

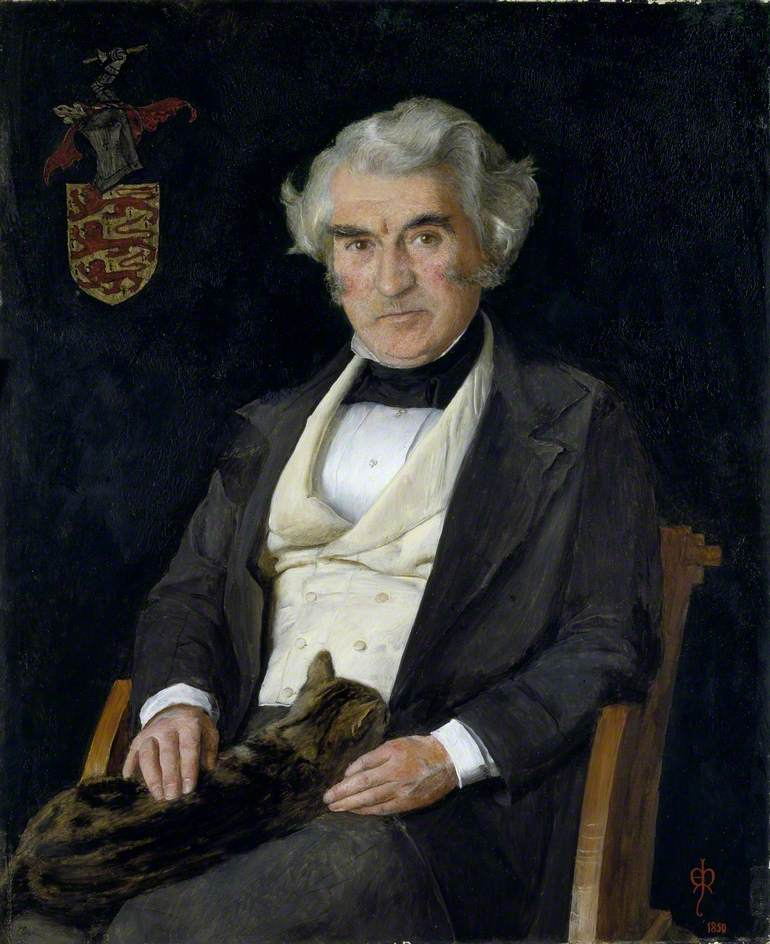
- Artist: John Everett Millais
- Year: 1850
- Type: Oil on panel
- Dimensions: 33 cm × 27 cm (13 in × 11 in)
- Location: Ashmolean Museum, Oxford

Thomas Combe is a portrait painting by the English artist John Everett Millais of the Oxford publisher, Thomas Combe, painted in 1850. Combe is seated on a wooden chair, with a tabby cat in his lap.

== The painting ==
Thomas Combe (1796–1872) was 'Printer to the University' at Oxford University Press, Oxford. He met Millais and fellow painter Charles Allston Collins by chance in 1850 when they were painting at Botley Woods. He was interested in their work and invited them back to his home for lunch, but Millais and Collins declined the offer as they were too busy painting. Once Combe arrived home he sent over a hamper of food for them instead, thus beginning their relationship. Combe and his wife Martha (1806–1893) were patrons of the arts and held regular salons at their home in Printer's House on Walton Street, Oxford, and by the end of September 1850 both Millais and Collins had moved into the Combes' home. It was here that Millais painted the portrait of Thomas Combe, while Collins finished working on the garden background of his painting Convent Thoughts.

Millais painted the portrait in eight hours, split into four two-hour sittings. The coat-of-arms is nothing to do with Thomas Combe; rather it is that of Shakespeare's friend, John Combe, granted to him in 1584. Thomas Combe died in 1872, and his widow Martha died in 1893. She bequeathed the painting, together with many other works in their collection of Pre-Raphaelite art, to the Ashmolean Museum in Oxford.

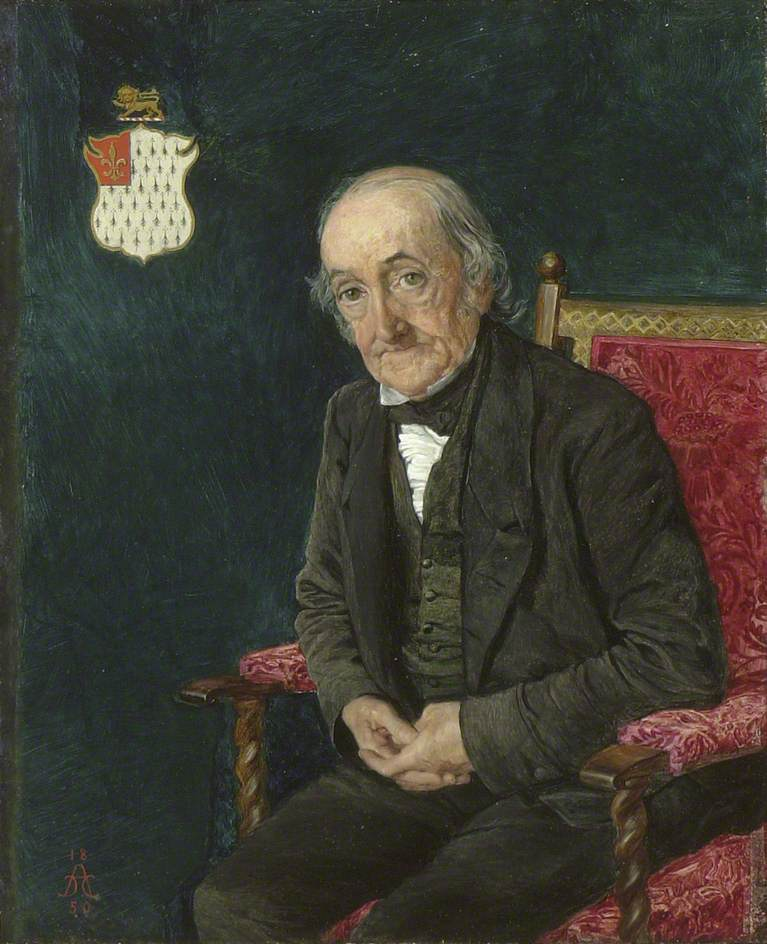
Portrait of William Bennett, 1850, by Charles Allston Collins, painted as a pendant piece to the portrait of Thomas Combe by Millais. Ashmolean Museum, Oxford.

During their 1850 stay with the Combe family, Collins painted a pendant (companion) portrait to Millais' one of Thomas Combe, a portrait of William Bennett, Martha Combe's maternal uncle. The portrait of Bennett is also in the Ashmolean.

== See also ==
- List of paintings by John Everett Millais
