= The Light of the World (Hunt) =

Painting by William Holman Hunt

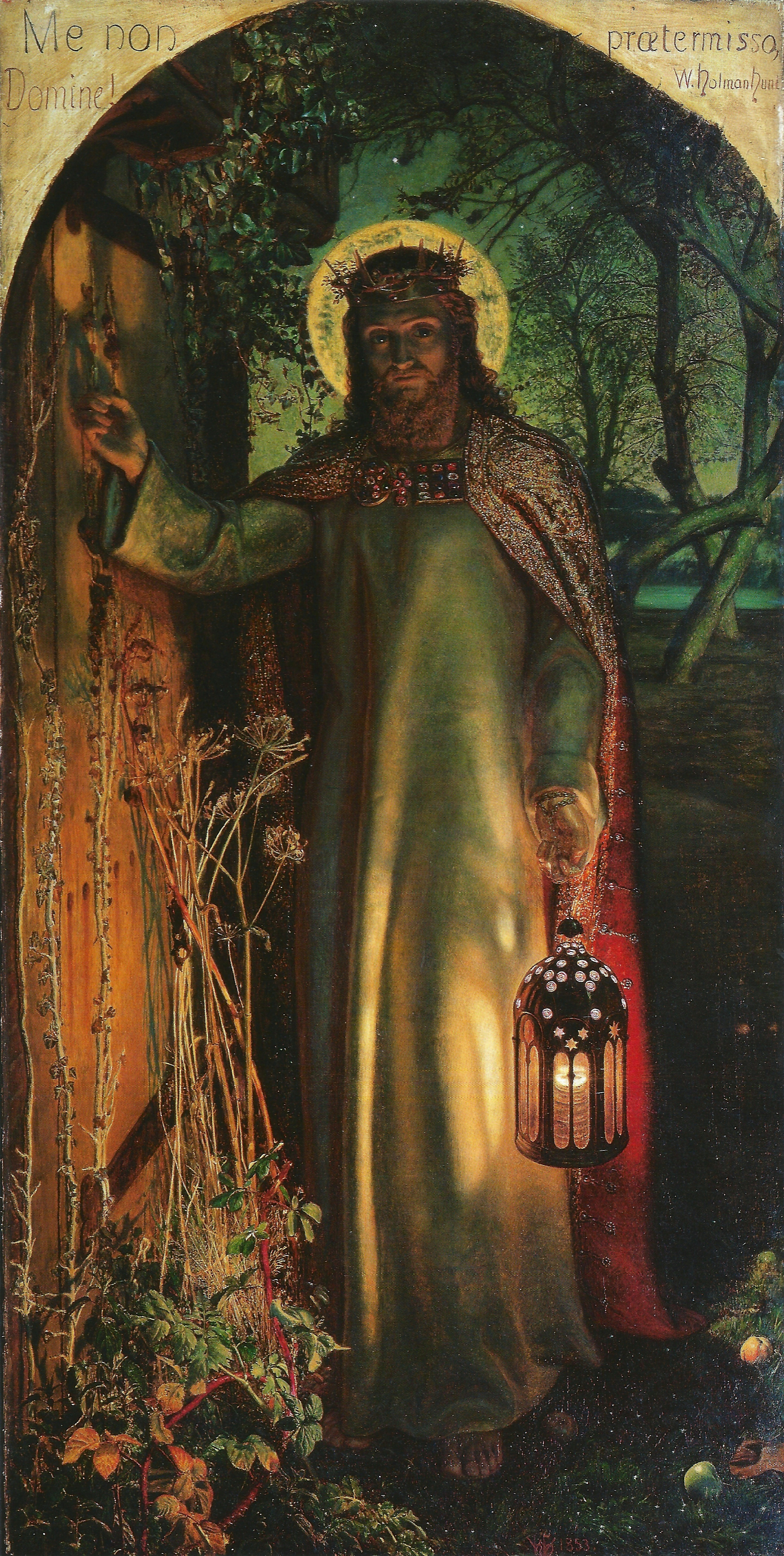
- Keble College version
- Artist: William Holman Hunt
- Year: 1853
- Medium: oil on canvas
- Dimensions: 125 cm × 60 cm (49 in × 24 in)
- Location: Keble College, Oxford

The Light of the World (1851–1854) is an allegorical painting by the English Pre-Raphaelite artist William Holman Hunt (1827–1910) representing the figure of Jesus preparing to knock on an overgrown and long-unopened door, illustrating Revelation 3:20: "Behold, I stand at the door and knock; if any man hear My voice, and open the door, I will come in to him, and will sup with him, and he with Me". According to Hunt: "I painted the picture with what I thought, unworthy though I was, to be divine command, and not simply a good subject." The door in the painting has no handle, and can therefore be opened only from the inside, representing "the obstinately shut mind". The painting was considered by many to be the most important and culturally influential rendering of Christ of its time.

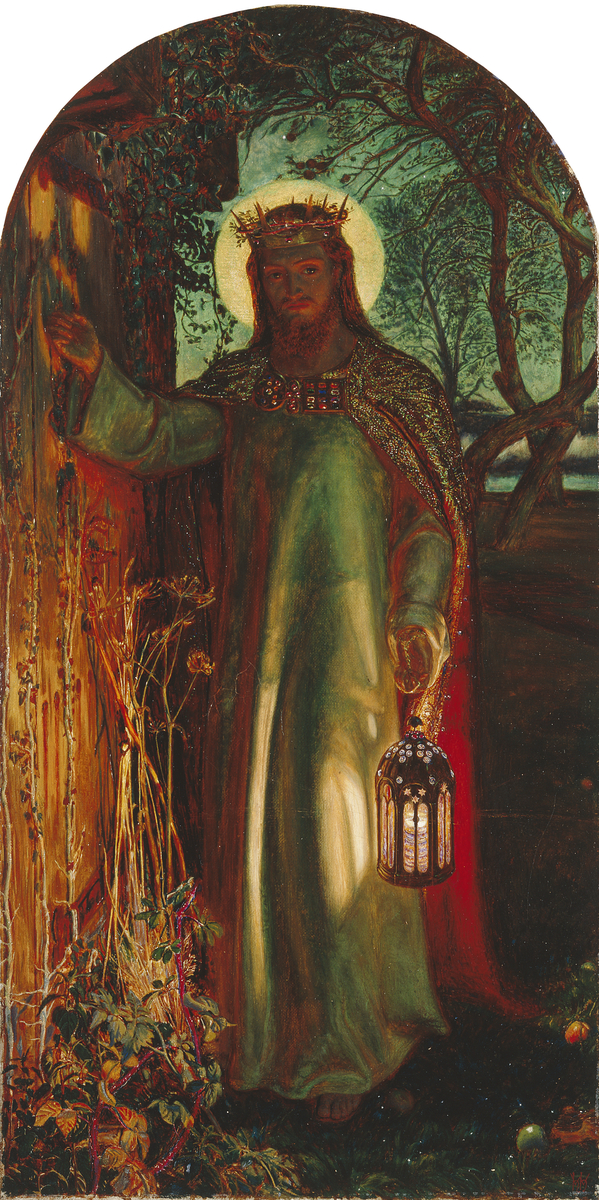
The Light of the World (Manchester version)

== Composition ==
Many speculated about the identity of the model. In January 1898, Edward Clodd sent Hunt a copy of a newspaper article on the subject, asking for Hunt's verification. Hunt had earlier told Clodd

… of my having used a cast from a clay model made by me, with a variety of male sitters, my father, Millais, John Capper and, in person, furtively from Carlyle, also from many departed heroes in effigy – the best I could get serving as my model for different parts of the head …

Hunt replied that "What [the author of the article] says about Miss Christina Rossetti sitting for the head . . . is true," which Rossetti did after Hunt felt he had "secured the male character in the head."

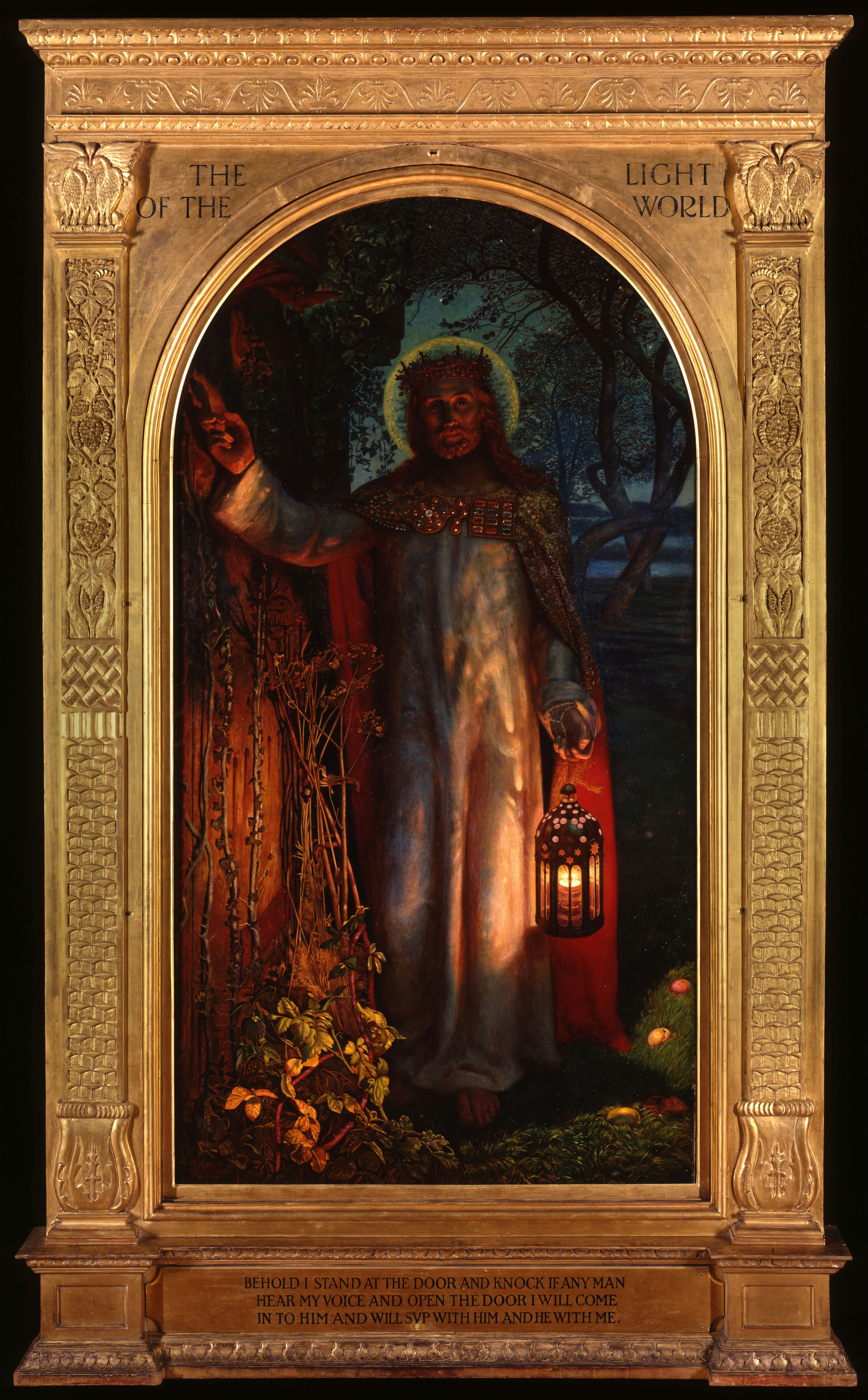
The Light of the World (St Paul's Cathedral version)

== Versions ==
The original is variously said to have been painted at night in a makeshift hut at Worcester Park Farm in Surrey, and in the garden of the Oxford University Press, while it is suggested that Hunt found the dawn light he needed outside Bethlehem on one of his visits to the Holy Land. In oil on canvas, it was begun around 1849 or 1850 and completed in 1854. It was exhibited at the Royal Academy in 1854 and is now in the side chapel at Keble College, Oxford. The painting was donated to the college by Martha Combe, the widow of Thomas Combe, Printer to the University of Oxford, Tractarian, and a patron of the Pre-Raphaelites, in the year following his death in 1872, on the understanding that it would hang in the chapel (constructed 1873–1876), but the building's architect William Butterfield was opposed to that and made no provision in his design. When the college library opened in 1878 it was placed there, and was moved to its present position only after the construction of the side chapel to accommodate it, in 1892–1895, by another architect, J. T. Micklethwaite.

A second, smaller version of the work, painted by Hunt between 1851 and 1856, is on display at Manchester City Art Gallery, England, which purchased it in 1912. There are small differences between that and the first version, such as the angle of the gaze, and the drape of the corner of the red cloak.

The fact that, at the time, Keble College charged a fee to view the picture, persuaded Hunt to paint a larger, life-sized, version toward the end of his life. He began it in about 1900 and finished in 1904. Shipowner and social reformer, Charles Booth, purchased the work and it was hung in St Paul's Cathedral, London. It was dedicated there in 1908, following a 1905–1907 world tour, during which the picture drew large crowds. It was claimed that four-fifths of Australia's population viewed it. Due to Hunt's increasing infirmity and glaucoma, he was assisted in the completion of this version by English painter Edward Robert Hughes (who also assisted with Hunt's version of The Lady of Shalott). The third version diverges more from the original than the second one.

== Reception ==
The painting gave rise to much popular devotion in the late Victorian period and inspired several musical works, including Arthur Sullivan's 1873 oratorio The Light of the World. Engraved reproductions were widely hung in nurseries, schools and church buildings.
