= Manuel Johnson (disambiguation) =

Manuel Johnson (born 1986) is an American football player.

Manuel Johnson may also refer to:

- Manuel H. Johnson (born 1949), American economist
- Manuel John Johnson (1805–1859), British astronomer
