= Martha Combe =

British philanthropist

- Born: Martha Edwards; 1806; Oxford, England
- Died: 27 December 1893 (aged 86–87)
- Spouse(s): Thomas Combe, m.1840-1872, his death.

Martha Howell Bennett Combe (née Edwards; 1806 - 27 December 1893) was a British art collector who was influential in supporting and promoting the work of the Pre-Raphaelite Brotherhood.

== Biography ==
Combe was born in Oxford, one of the five daughters of a local ironmonger. In 1840 she married Thomas Combe, then a superintendent at the Oxford University Press but who became a senior partner at the Press and also very rich in the process. This allowed the couple to support several local charities and also to build their art collection. In particular they met and befriended Charles Allston Collins and John Everett Millais. Although the work of the Pre-Raphaelites' was being denounced by art critics, the Combes bought several substantial examples of their work. These included A Converted British Family Sheltering a Christian Missionary from the Persecution of the Druids by William Holman Hunt in 1850, The Return of the Dove to the Ark by Millais in 1851 and Collins' Convent Thoughts the same year. Two years later they acquired Hunt's The Light of the World for 400 guineas. Dante Drewing an Angel by Dante Gabriel Rossetti was purchased in 1855 and The School-Girls Hymn and a version of The Afterglow in Egypt, both by Hunt, in 1860 and 1861. After Thomas Combe died in October 1872, Martha bequeathed most of the paintings to Oxford University who placed them with the Ashmolean Museum. She continued to collect, for example buying Hunt's London Bridge by Night, and made further donations, most notably giving The Light of the World to Keble College. Martha Combe died in 1893 and is buried in St Sepulchre's Cemetery in Oxford beside her husband. A blue plaque on the wall of St Barnabas Church in Oxford commemorates the couple.
