= James Adey Ogle =

English physician (1792-1857)

James Adey Ogle (1792–1857) was an English medical doctor.

== Life ==
He was born on 22 October 1792 in Great Russell Street, London, where his father Richard Ogle had a good practice as a general practitioner. In 1808 he was sent to Eton College, under Joseph Goodall, staying two years. In Lent term 1810 he entered as a commoner of Trinity College, Oxford, obtaining a scholarship in the following year. In Easter term 1813 he obtained a first class in mathematics.

Ogle became a medical student at the Windmill Street school. From 1814 he visited medical schools in France, Italy, and Germany. He also spent some winter sessions in Edinburgh, studying under Professors Gregory, Duncan, Hamilton, Gordon, Home, and Jamieson. Returning to London, he was a student at the Middlesex Hospital, and then at St. Bartholomew's Hospital, and proceeded to the degrees of M.A. and M.B. at Oxford in 1816 and 1817 respectively. Settling in Oxford, he graduated M.D. in 1820, and was appointed mathematical tutor of his college, Trinity, the same year. One of his pupils was John Henry Newman, who became a friend.

Ogle was elected F.R.C.P. in 1822, physician to the Radcliffe Infirmary and to the Warneford Lunatic Asylum at Oxford in 1824, Aldrich professor of medicine in the university in 1824, public examiner in 1825, Fellow of the Royal Society in 1826, and clinical professor of medicine in 1830. In 1836 he was associated with John Kidd and Charles Daubeny in a revision of the university statutes regulating medical degrees, and set up a public examination for the degree of M.B.

Ogle delivered the Harveian oration in 1844, and was appointed regius professor of medicine at Oxford by Lord John Russell in 1851, in succession to Kidd. He was president of the Provincial Medical Association at its meeting at Oxford in 1852, and was examiner in the new school of natural science in 1854-5. He died of apoplexy, after an illness of thirty hours, at the vicarage, Old Shoreham, the residence of his son-in-law James Bowling Mozley, on 25 September 1857; he was buried in St Sepulchre's Cemetery in Oxford.

== Works ==
In 1841 appeared Ogle's only publication, A Letter to the Reverend the Warden of Wadham College, on the System of Education pursued at Oxford; with Suggestions for remodelling the Examination Statute. This pamphlet made the first suggestion of a natural science school at Oxford, established by a statute brought forward in 1851. He anticipated also a change, by his proposal for an admission examination.

== Family ==
In 1810 Ogle married Sarah, younger daughter of Jeston Homfray, esq., of Broadwaters, near Kidderminster. She died in 1835, leaving four sons and five daughters.

Three of the four sons were clerics:

- James Ambrose Ogle (1824/1825–?).
- Richard Jeston Ogle (c.1826 –?).
- The third son, Dr. William Ogle (1827/1828–?), became superintendent of statistics in the registrar-general's office.
- Octavius Ogle (1828/1829–?).

Of the daughters (including one pair of twins):

- Janet (1821–1890) never married
- Amelia (1822–1872) married in 1856 James Bowling Mozley.
- Caroline (1822–1881) married in 1850 Manuel John Johnson.
- Mary (1823/4–?) married the Rev. Charles Walter Payne Crawfurd, and was mother of Raymond Crawfurd.
- Isabella Henrietta (1832–), the youngest, married in 1855 the Rev. Charles Terry, who was heir to the Pettiward Estate.

After the death of Amelia, Caroline (by then herself a widow) lived with Mozley and assisted in his parish work at Shoreham, until his death.

== Notes ==
Attribution

This article incorporates text from a publication now in the public domain: Lee, Sidney, ed. (1895). "Ogle, James Adey". Dictionary of National Biography. Vol. 42. London: Smith, Elder & Co.
