= Alfred Hackman =

British librarian (1811–1874)

Alfred Hickman
- Born: Fulham, London, England
- Died: 18 September 1874 (aged 63); Long Ditton, Surrey, England
- Occupation: Sub-librarian at the Bodleian Library

Alfred Hackman (1811–1874) was sub-librarian at the Bodleian Library.

== Early life ==
Hackman was born in Fulham, southwest of London, on 8 April 1811. His father, Thomas Hackman, was the parochial vestry clerk in Fulham, giving him access to the powerful Bishop of London, William Howley. Through Howley's influence, Alfred Hackman matriculated as a servitor of Christ Church, Oxford on 25 October 1832. Hackman was educated in France, and then spent several years as an usher in a boarding-school run by his father. Hackman graduated from university with a Bachelor of Arts degree in 1837 and then received a Master of Arts degree in 1840.

== Career ==
Through the influence of Thomas Gaisford, curator of the Bodleian library, Hackman obtained a temporary post in 1837, and was connected with the library for more than thirty-five years afterwards. In 1837, Hackman also became the chaplain of Christ Church College in Oxford, and curate to the Reverend Henry Gary at St. Paul's Church in Oxford (now a student coffehouse). Hackman was appointed by his college vicar of Cowley, near Oxford, in 1839, and was from 1841 to 1873 a precentor at Christ Church.

From 1844 to 1871 Hackman was vicar of St. Paul's, where he exercised a considerable influence as a preacher, not only on his own parishioners, but also on the undergraduates of the university, who were attracted by his earnestness and quaint vivacity. Hackman attended to his parish, with his free time largely occupied by his duties in the Bodleian Library, where in 1862 he was appointed sub-librarian. Hackman published A Catalogue of the Collection of the Tanner MSS in the Bodleian, Oxford 1860.

== Death ==
In 1873, Hackman retired from the library and Christ Church due to poor health. He died, unmarried, in his brother's house in the village of Long Ditton, Surrey, on 18 Sep 1874. He was buried at St. Sepulchre's Cemetery in Oxford.
