= The Return of the Dove to the Ark =

Painting by John Everett Millais

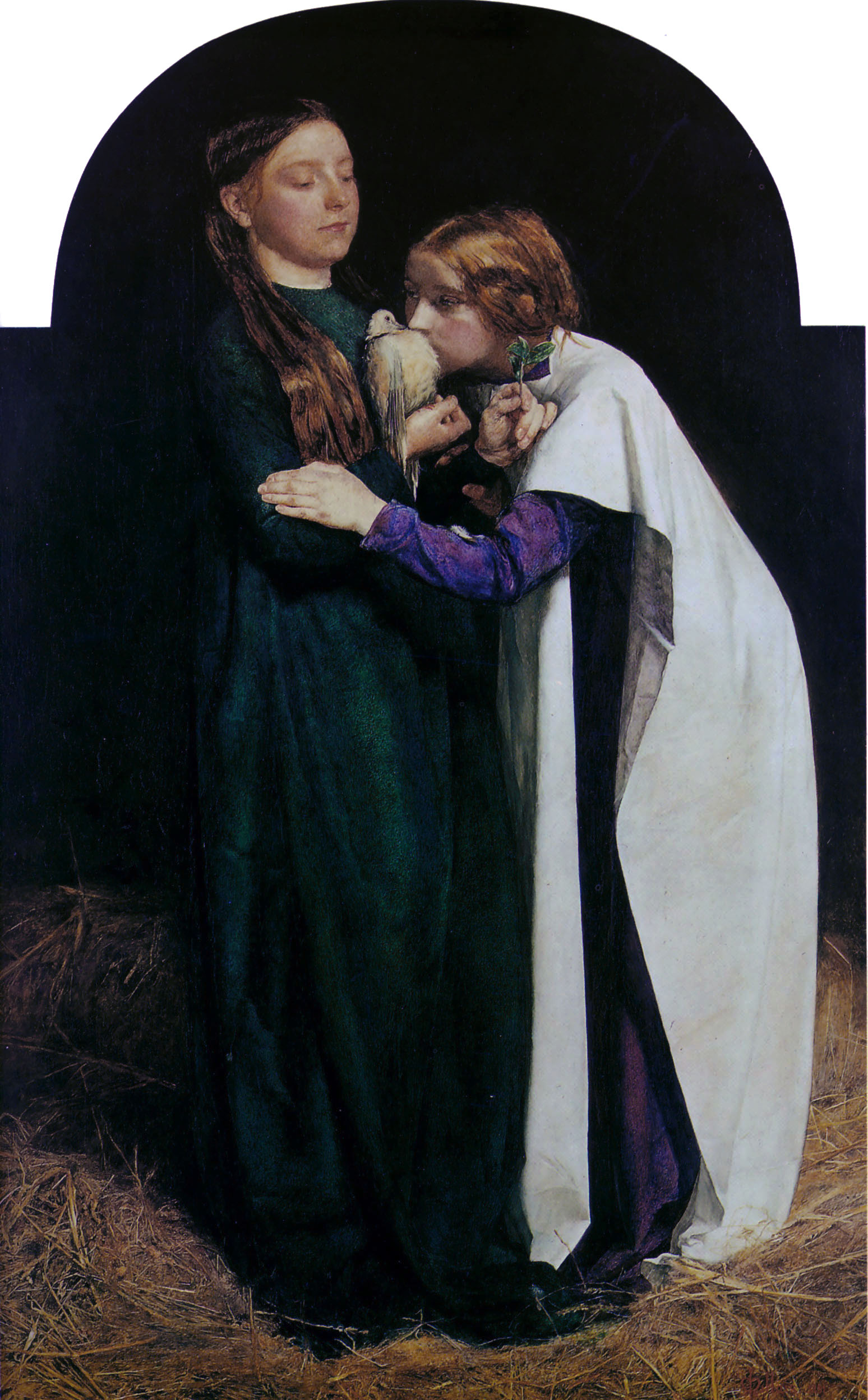
- Artist: John Everett Millais
- Year: 1851
- Type: Oil on canvas, history painting
- Dimensions: 88.2 cm × 54.9 cm (34.7 in × 21.6 in)
- Location: Ashmolean Museum, Oxford

The Return of the Dove to the Ark is a painting by Sir John Everett Millais, completed in 1851. It is in the Thomas Combe collection at the Ashmolean Museum, Oxford.

The painting portrays a scene from the Bible. Two of Noah's daughters-in-law nurture the dove that has returned to the Ark bearing an olive branch. Millais had some intention of producing a "pendant" painting titled The Dove's First Flight, but never did so.

Millais's original plan for the painting was to include the figure of Noah, as well as including several animals in the background. The final omission of these other figures is thought to have been due to his desire to have the painting ready for the Royal Academy exhibition of 1851.

The Return of the Dove to the Ark was first put on public display at the Royal Academy in April 1851. Millais was surprised to learn that some Roman Catholics who viewed it believed it to be an allegory for the return of the country to the "true faith".

It was praised by John Ruskin and Théophile Gautier, among others. Ruskin was so taken with it that he wished to buy it when he first saw it, but it had already been sold to the collector Thomas Combe, superintendent of the Clarendon Press, who owned many other Pre-Raphaelite works of art. It passed to the Ashmolean as part of the Combe Bequest in 1893.

In 1855, a French satirical magazine, Journal pour rire, printed a cartoon by Bertall parodying Millais's painting.

The painting was used for the cover of electronic dance music album ULTRACLUB4K (2020) by døves and Wicca Phase Springs Eternal, presumably on account of the connection between the image of the dove and døves' stage name. (The album is also tagged "devotional", implying a religious connection).

== See also ==
- List of paintings by John Everett Millais
