= William Ince (theologian) =

British theologian

William Ince (1825–1910) was a British theologian. He was Regius Professor of Divinity at Oxford, from 1878.

== Life ==
Ince was educated at King's College School and Lincoln College, Oxford, where he took first-class honours in Literae Humaniores (BA 1846, MA 1849, DD 1878).

He was a fellow of Exeter College, Oxford, from 1847 to 1878 (Sub Rector 1857-78) and Regius Professor of Divinity in the University of Oxford and Canon Residentiary of Christ Church, Oxford from 1878 until his death (Sub Dean 1901 to death). He was also Junior Proctor 1856/7, Preacher at the Chapel Royal 1860-62 and Examining Chaplain to the Bishop of Oxford 1871-89.

The Chapel of Exeter College, Oxford, designed by George Gilbert Scott, was consecrated by the Bishop of Oxford on St Luke's Day 1859. A few weeks later Ince, preaching in the chapel, warned the congregation, 'Better to worship in the plainest barn with the full outpouring of the heart to God, than in the most gorgeous cathedral ever raised…, if only the sense of beauty finds its satisfaction there, and the heart and the life are estranged from God in Christ'.

In 1892 he spoke at the funeral of Noel Freeling, Vicar of Holywell Church, remarking, 'By the strange and wholly unexpected change of circumstance which has befallen collegiate life in this University, he was at his college at the moment of his death the only clerical Fellow of the whole body.'

== Publications ==
- The three creeds, specially the so-called Athanasian creed, a sermon (Oxford, 1904)
- Sunday observance, a sermon (Oxford, 1901)
- The doctrine of the real presence, a letter about the recent declaration of the English Church union (London, 1900)
- A retrospect of progress in the Church of England during the nineteenth century, a sermon (Oxford, 1900)
- The Church of England Catholic and Protestant, a sermon (London, 1899)
- The future life — the intermediate state — Heaven, 2 sermons (Oxford, 1895)
- The scriptural and Anglican view of the functions of the Christian ministry, a sermon (Oxford, 1895)
- The permanent educational value of the Old Testament in the Christian Church, a paper (Derby, 1892)
- The remembrance of a faithful pastor, a sermon preached on the Sunday after the funeral of G.N. Freeling (Oxford, 1892)
- The real presence and adoration in the eucharist as taught by the Church of England, a sermon (Oxford, 1891)
- A memory of bishop Mackarness: a sermon (Oxford, 1889)
- A sermon preached in commemoration of founder's day at the grammar school at Berkhamsted (London, 1886)
- Disestablishment of the Church injurious to unity and true freedom of teaching, a sermon (Oxford, 1885)
- Strengthen thy brethren, a sermon (Oxford, 1885)
- The Luther commemoration and the Church of England, a sermon (London, 1883)
- The education of the clergy at the universities, a sermon (Oxford, 1882)
- The patristic and liturgical interpretation of τούτο ποιείτε, a second letter to H.R. Bramley (Oxford, 1879)
- The primitive interpretation of τούτο ποιείτε, a letter in reply to H.R. Bramley (Oxford, 1879)
- The religious aspects of nature, a sermon (London, 1879)
- The internal duties of the university, in prospect of external changes: a sermon (Oxford, 1878)
- Parting counsels, a sermon (Oxford, 1878)
- The past history and present duties of the faculty of theology in Oxford, two inaugural lectures (Oxford, 1878)
- Religion in the University of Oxford: a paper (Oxford, 1875)
- A plea for definite Christian doctrine, a sermon (Oxford, 1865)
- Aspects of Christian truth suited to the religious thought of the age, 3 Advent sermons (Oxford, 1862)
- Faithful stewardship, a sermon on occasion of the death of T. Hewlett (Oxford, 1862)
- Palm Sunday thoughts, a sermon on occasion of the death of J. Nutt (2nd edn. Oxford, 1859)

Academic offices
Preceded by James Bowling Mozley	Regius Professor of Divinity at Oxford; 1878—1911	Succeeded by Henry Scott Holland
