= Herbert Jackson (crammer) =

English university tutor (1851–1921)

A sketch of Jackson

Herbert Jackson (1 March 1851 – 3 February 1921) was an English crammer associated with the University of Oxford. The son of a Devon doctor, Jackson attended the University of Oxford from 1868 as one of its first unattached students (not associated with any university college). After graduation in 1874, he refused to take the university's Master of Arts degree and worked briefly as an usher. He returned to Oxford to work as a crammer, a tutor who coached students to pass exams and gained a reputation as the last hope of men on the verge of failing their degrees.

Jackson was eccentric in personality. His reputation for taking long walks in the nearby countryside gave him the nickname "The British Workman", shortened to "Britters" in the Oxford style. Jackson wore old clothes and trousers with a low crotch, which led to rumours among students that they concealed a coiled-up tail.

== Early life ==
Jackson was born on 1 March 1851 at Bere Ferrers near Plymouth. His father, Richard Smart Jackson, was a medical doctor and claimed to be a cousin of the Confederate general Stonewall Jackson. Jackson's mother was Ann Tapson Channon and he had two older brothers, George and Barnard, and a sister, Ann. Barnard died in early 1868 and Jackson's mother later that year.

The University of Oxford passed an act in 1868 that permitted men to matriculate as unattached students (Scholares nulli Collegio vel Aulae ascripti; "Scholars enrolled in no college or hall"), without being associated with any university college. Jackson matriculated as an unattached student on 22 October 1869. Jackson's father and sister moved to join him in Oxford in 1871, while George remained in Plymouth where he practised as a surgeon. Jackson received third class honours in his first year Moderations exams in 1871. His father died in Oxford in 1874 and Jackson received an ordinary Bachelor of Arts degree (ie. without honours) in Literae Humaniores on 6 June 1874, having elected not to sit the honours exam. He maintained a lifelong admiration for George Kitchin who was censor for the unattached students at Oxford during his period studying there.

Jackson was raised in the Congregational church and in Oxford worshipped at the Congregational Chapel on George Street, until the death of his father upon which he ceased attending. Jackson claimed to see no value in the Oxford Master of Arts degree and refused to take it. He was briefly employed as an usher in a school.

== Crammer ==
Jackson returned to Oxford to work as a crammer, or pass coach, providing tuition to students with the sole purpose of enabling them to pass exams. As a crammer his role was "not to teach, nor to test teaching; but to enable students to pass the tests". The military historian and Oxford professor Charles Oman described Jackson as "the last refuge of the much-ploughed man who was on the eve of dismissal from his College" (for poor academic performance). The Oxford Chronicle noted that Jackson had "a considerable reputation for success with backward men" and he had particular expertise with Hebrew.

Jackson worked as a crammer for almost the next 40 years, focusing on wealthy undergraduates seeking only to achieve an ordinary degree. He is recorded in the 1881 census as residing at a lodging house on Museum Terrace; by 1891 he had moved to St John Street where he rented rooms in the home of a clerk of the Bodleian Library. By 1911 he was living at a different house in St John Street, the home of a baker.

== Personality ==
In his younger years Jackson was a keen sportsman with an interest in boxing and hunting. In the last 40 years of his life, Jackson did not spend a single night outside of Oxford. He suffered from a chronic medical condition connected with uric acid. As well as maintaining a strict diet Jackson took long walks in the countryside on Sundays, sometimes reaching as far as Stanton Harcourt or Long Wittenham. The walks led him to become a popular local figure and he became known by the Oxford "-er" nickname of "Britters" after a depiction of him, entitled "The British Workman", appeared in the window of a local shop.

Jackson was a frequent visitor to the Oxford Union. An eyewitness during Jackson's later years, medical student H.E. Counsell noted that Jackson would arrive at the Union as soon as it opened. He said Jackson would collect all of the newspapers, pile them on an armchair and sit on top of them, often sleeping there. When one of his friends entered Jackson would offer them use of a newspaper but return it to the pile immediately after they had finished. Jackson also held parties for academics and students in his rooms on Friday evenings. Counsell arrived at one event and was chastised for ringing the doorbell and disturbing the flow of conversation within. Attendees were given a glass of water, filled almost to the brim, and told to add whisky to taste, though the glass permitted not much to be added. Jackson would quote at length from old political or judicial speeches to attendees and often spoke of his hatred for some of his family.

Jackson's failing eyesight in later years led to him being unable to read newspapers or continue his long walks. He also gave up alcohol and smoking. Although he continued to attend the Oxford Union he became notedly less communicative whilst there.

Jackson's attire was considered eccentric. Oman described him as wearing "an old grey jacket, a very baggy pair of flannel trousers, and a woollen scarf or comforter twisted round his neck instead of a collar. His headgear varied between a straw hat and a shapeless felt". In later years Jackson often wore an old bowler hat. Counsell recalled Jackson's shirt being worn open at the throat, exposing a hairy chest, and that he wore large white socks loosely over oversized shoes.

Jackson's trousers reached only two-thirds of the way down his legs but had a very low crotch, almost at his knees. A contemporary described the attire as an economic choice, being unwilling to spend money on tailored clothes. When his trousers wore out Jackson added a new tier of material at the waistband, causing the crotch to become lower and lower. The unusual trousers led to a rumour among undergraduates that Jackson had them that way to accommodate a coiled-up tail.

In later years Jackson grew fat, weighing 20 stone (280 lb; 130 kg) by Counsell's time, and his short coat could no longer button up and bulged at the seams. Counsell recalled that Jackson's unusual clothing led him to become a "stupendous oddity" known among generations of undergraduates.

== Retirement and death ==
Jackson's funeral

Shortly after 1911, Jackson was forced to retire due to failing eyesight. He died at his residence on St John Street on 3 February 1921. At the time of his death he was one of the oldest surviving non-collegiate students of the university and his estate was valued at £2,801. Jackson was buried in St Sepulchre's Cemetery on 7 February 1921, and the funeral was attended by a nephew and representatives of the university. His gravestone is rendered in Latin and notes his status as an unattached student and claims him as "a man of unbending integrity". It also states "he was equally robust in mind and body (but both alas were for a long time equally tormented)".
