= Convent Thoughts =

1850–51 painting by Charles Allston Collins

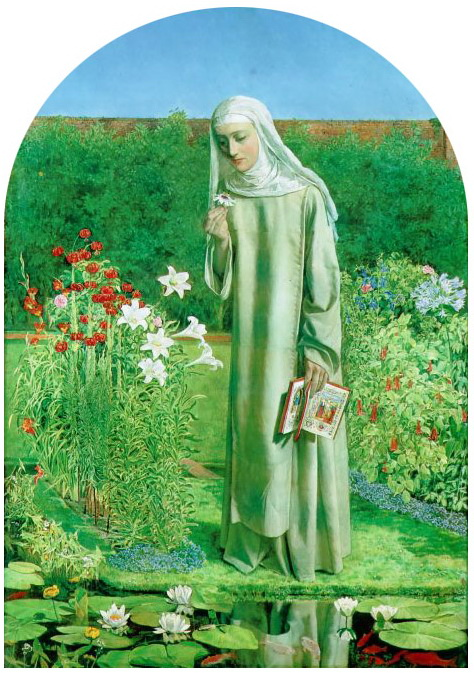
- Artist: Charles Allston Collins
- Year: 1850–51
- Medium: Oil on canvas
- Dimensions: 84 cm × 59 cm (33 in × 23 in)
- Location: Ashmolean Museum, Oxford

Convent Thoughts is a painting by the Pre-Raphaelite painter Charles Allston Collins which was created between 1850 and 1851. Collins sent it to the Royal Academy of Arts in 1851 where it was exhibited.

The painting shows a nun contemplating a passion flower symbolising the crucifixion of Christ. She is standing in a walled garden full of minutely detailed flowers. In her left hand she holds an illuminated Breviary or Book of Hours, held not as though she had been reading it but so as to show us the Annunciation and the Crucifixion. Her costume shows that she is a novice, presumably meditating on her final vows.

The flowers were painted in the Oxford garden of Thomas Combe, an early collector of Pre-Raphaelite paintings, and the model is often said to have been his housemaid, Frances Sarah Ludlow, later Mrs Brucker. Probably she modelled for preliminary sketches for the painting, but recent research has shown that the face is almost certainly that of Sarah Eliza Hackett. Combe bought the painting and it was bequeathed by his widow, Martha Combe, to the Ashmolean Museum, Oxford and Convent Thoughts remains in the Museum's collection.

Although Collins was never formally a member of the Pre-Raphaelite Brotherhood, he was in sympathy with their aims and painted in their immensely detailed style. Convent Thoughts has a place in the history of Pre-Raphaelitism, because the tide of opinion, initially hostile, was to some extent turned by a letter to The Times on 13 May 1851 from the influential critic John Ruskin praising the Pre-Raphaelite paintings at the Academy exhibition, in particular Convent Thoughts, about which he wrote:

"I happen to have a special acquaintance with the water plant Alisma Plantago ... and as I never saw it so thoroughly or so well drawn, I must take leave to remonstrate with you, when you say sweepingly that these men 'sacrifice truth as well as feeling to eccentricity.' For as a mere botanical study of the Water Lily and Alisma, as well as of the common lily and several other garden flowers, this picture would be invaluable to me, and I heartily wish it were mine."

In a curious footnote to this story, it has recently been pointed out that there is in fact no Alisma Plantago in the picture.

== References and sources ==
Sources

- Prettejohn, Elizabeth (2000). The Art of the Pre-Raphaelites. London: Tate Publishing. ISBN 1-85437-313-7.
- Barringer, Tim (1998). The Pre-Raphaelites. London: Weidenfeld and Nicolson. ISBN 0-297-82408-2
