= James Bowling Mozley =

English theologian (1813–1878)

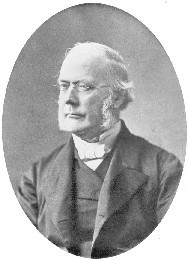

James Bowling Mozley (15 September 1813 – 4 January 1878) was an English theologian.

== Biography ==
He was born on 15 September 1813, at Gainsborough, Lincolnshire, the younger brother of Thomas Mozley, and was educated at Queen Elizabeth's Grammar School (now Queen Elizabeth's High School, Gainsborough) and later at Oriel College, Oxford.

Mozley was elected to a fellowship at Magdalen in 1840. He took an active part in the Oxford Movement. He said he could no more follow John Henry Newman, his brother-in-law, into the Roman communion "than fly". He was joint editor of the Christian Remembrancer. He withdrew from the position because of his substantial agreement with the famous Gorham decision.

Mozley was one of the earliest supporters of The Guardian, the High Church weekly. In 1856, he became vicar of Shoreham, in 1869 canon of Worcester, and in 1871 regius professor of divinity at Oxford.

He married Amelia Ogle (born 1822), daughter of James Adey Ogle, regius professor of medicine at Oxford, and his wife Sarah, in 1856. After her death in 1872, his wife's twin sister Caroline, herself the widow of astronomer Manuel John Johnson (died 1859), lived with him and assisted in his parish work at Shoreham.

He died at Shoreham on 4 January 1878,, survived by Caroline, who died in 1881.

== Works ==
- A Treatise on the Augustinian Doctrine of Predestination (1855)
- The Primitive Doctrine of Baptismal Regeneration (1856)
- A Review of the Baptismal Controversy (1862)
- Subscription to the Articles: a Letter (1863)
- Lectures on Miracles, being the Bampton Lectures for 1865
- Ruling Ideas in Early Ages and their relation to the Old Testament Faith (1877)
- Essays, Historical and Theological, appeared in 1878 (2 vols), with a biographical preface by his sister Anne, who also edited some of his Letters (1884).

Academic offices
Preceded by Robert Payne Smith	Regius Professor of Divinity at Oxford; 1871–1878	Succeeded by William Ince
