= St Barnabas Church, Oxford =

Church in Oxford, United Kingdom

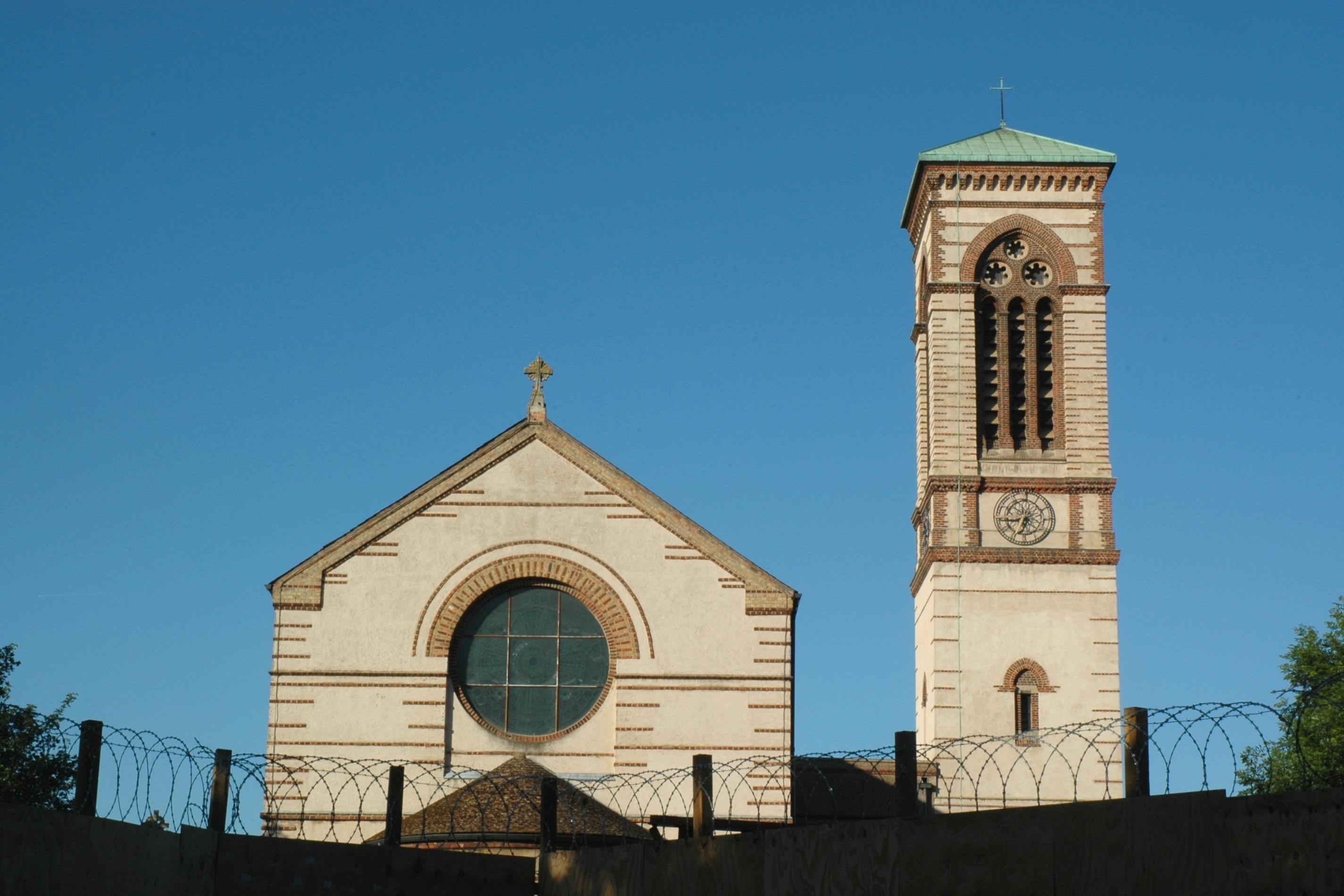
- View of St Barnabas Church and its campanile

- Location within Oxfordshire
- 51.7578°N 1.2697°W
- OS grid reference: TQ 34865 80368
- Location: St Barnabas Street, Jericho, Oxford, Oxfordshire, OX2 6BG
- Country: England
- Denomination: Church of England
- Churchmanship: Traditionalist Anglo-Catholic
- Website: Parish website

History
- Status: Active
- Founder(s): Thomas Combe and Martha Combe
- Dedication: St Barnabas
- Consecrated: 19 October 1869

Architecture
- Functional status: Parish church
- Heritage designation: Grade I listed
- Architect: Sir Arthur Blomfield
- Architectural type: Victorian, Romanesque, Italianate, Basilica

Administration
- Diocese: Diocese of Oxford
- Archdeaconry: Archdeaconry of Oxford
- Deanery: Oxford Deanery
- Parish: Oxford St. Barnabas and St. Paul with St Thomas the Martyr

Clergy
- Bishop(s): The Rt Revd Steven Croft, Bishop of Oxford
- Vicar: Fr Christopher Woods

St Barnabas Church Jericho is a Church of England parish church in Jericho, central Oxford, England, located close to the Oxford Canal. It is also informally known as 'Oxford Basilica'.

== History ==
St Barnabas, like many similar churches in the expanding towns and cities of Victorian England, was built to minister to the spiritual and practical needs of the poor and labouring classes. The parish was formed from that of St Paul, Oxford, in 1869; St Paul's was in turn formed from parts of the parishes of St Thomas and St Giles. The church was founded by Thomas Combe (1796–1872), Superintendent of the Oxford University Press close to the church, and his wife Martha (1806–1893), now commemorated by a blue plaque installed by the Oxfordshire Blue Plaques Board. They were supporters of the Oxford Movement (or Tractarian movement). The first Parish Priest was Fr Montague Noel, SSC.

The architect was Sir Arthur Blomfield, a son of the Bishop of London, who had previously designed the chapel for the Radcliffe Infirmary. The architectural style is that of a Romanesque basilica, modelled on San Clemente in Rome, San Francesco and Sant'Apollinare Nuovo in Ravenna, and Santa Maria Assunta in Torcello. St Barnabas has a distinctive square tower, in the form of an Italianate campanile, that is visible from the surrounding area. The church was built on land donated by George Ward, a local landowner and member of the influential Ward family (named as the donor in the land conveyance, etc., in the Oxford Diocesan Archives). George's brother William Ward was Mayor of Oxford on two occasions, 1851/2 and 1861/2. It was consecrated in 1869 by Bishop Wilberforce of Oxford, and the campanile was completed in 1872. The pulpit was added in 1887 by Heaton, Butler, and Bayne with the panels painted by Charles Floyce. This replaced a cylindrical timber pulpit with columns and a moulded cornice which is now at St Peter's, London Docks.

It has a ring of ten, distinctive, tubular bells, and the hours and quarters are sounded on them.

An associated girls' and infant school for St. Barnabas's was built on a site in Cardigan Street in 1857. The current St Barnabas Church of England Primary School is located at the end of Cardigan Street, on Hart Street.

== St Barnabas in literature ==
St Barnabas features in a wide range of literature, from Thomas Hardy in Jude the Obscure to P. D. James. The poet John Betjeman wrote a poem about the church, 'St Barnabas, Oxford'. Other passing mentions of the church include books by Colin Dexter. Robert Bernard Martin, Evelyn Waugh, and A. N. Wilson.

Dr Amanda Vernon has written a short essay surveying the appearance of St Barnabas in literature.

== Present day ==
The church maintains the Anglo-Catholic tradition of its foundation. A parish magazine, Jericho Matters, was, until 2020, produced quarterly and distributed to all of the households and businesses in Jericho. The church hosts many events throughout the year, such as concerts, lectures, and exhibitions.

In September 2015 the parish was united with the neighbouring parish of St Thomas the Martyr, to form the new parish of St Barnabas and St Paul, with St Thomas the Martyr, Oxford. St Barnabas is the parish church and St Thomas is the chapel of ease. The first vicar of the new parish was Fr Jonathan Beswick, SSC. The current Vicar is Fr Christopher Woods, who until February 2019 was Vicar of St Anne's Hoxton in the Diocese of London.

Historically, resolutions A and B (preventing a woman from presiding at holy communion, and from being appointed as incumbent, respectively) had been in place at St Barnabas and all three resolutions at St Thomas. Between 2018 and 2023, the parish received joint episcopal oversight from the Bishop of Oxford and the Bishop of Ebbsfleet, and after The Bishop of Ebbsfleet’s conversion to Roman Catholicism in 2022, the Bishop of Oswestry (Ebbsfleet and subsequently Oswestry being the traditionalist catholic provincial episcopal visitor for those who cannot in conscience accept the priestly and episcopal ministry of women).

In November 2022, the parish began a consultation as to whether or not to accept the priestly and episcopal ministry of women, and in January 2023, the PCC voted by a majority to welcome the ministry of women priests and bishops. The Revd Dr Melanie Marshall was the first woman to preside at the Parish Mass and did so on 14 May 2023.

== Access ==
The church is open daily from 9 am to 6 pm.

A short guide to the building and its story is available from the church. Until 2025, there was an Emma Bridgewater 'Jericho' mug, commissioned specially for St Barnabas.

== Gallery ==
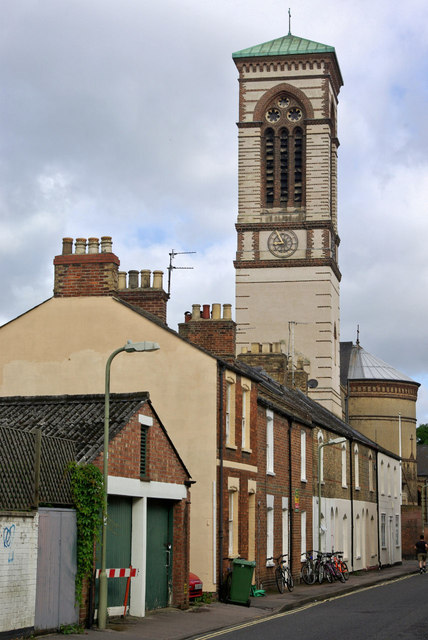
View of the campanile from Canal Street in Jericho, Oxford.

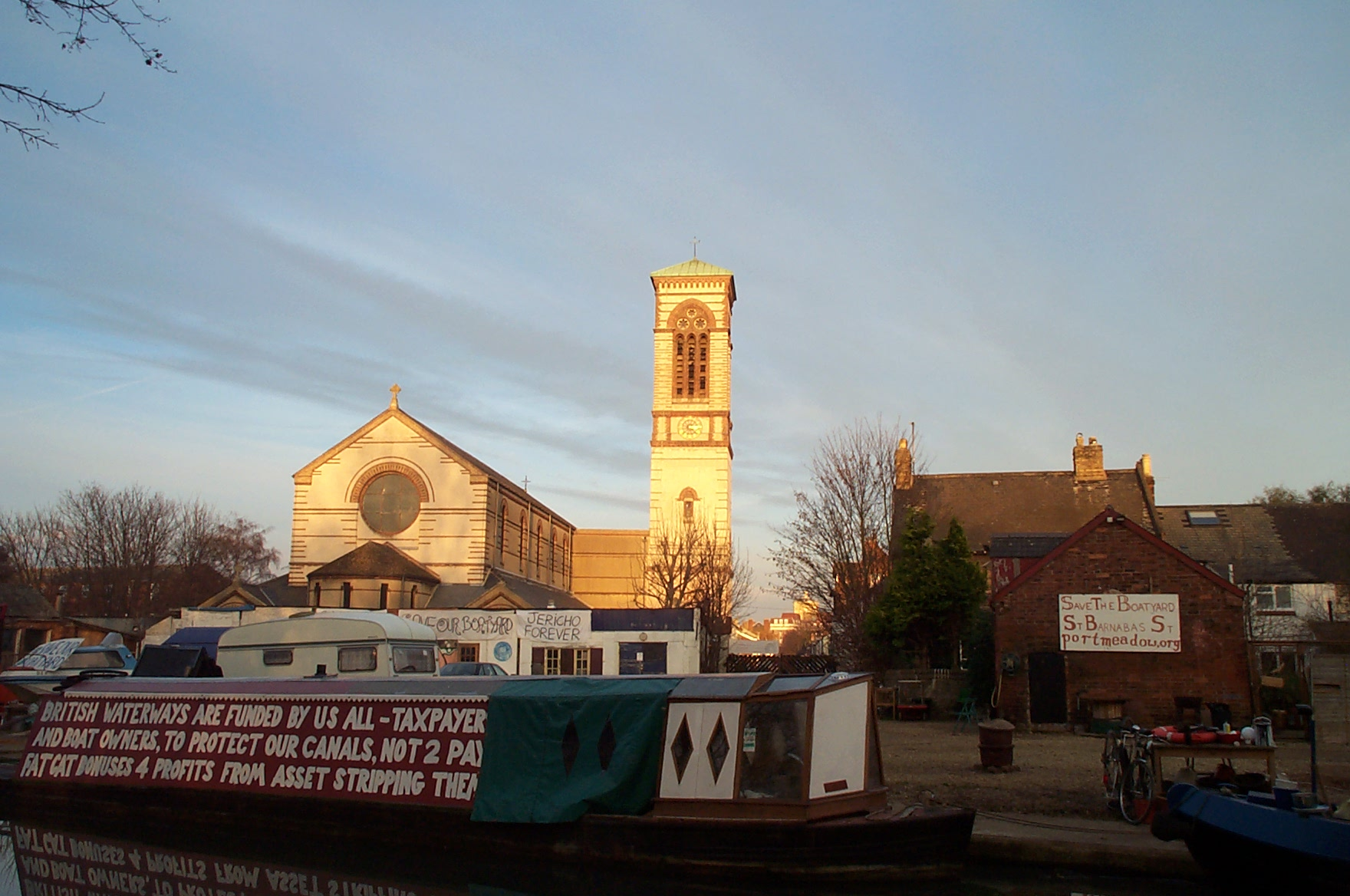
St Barnabas Church from the Oxford Canal in Jericho.

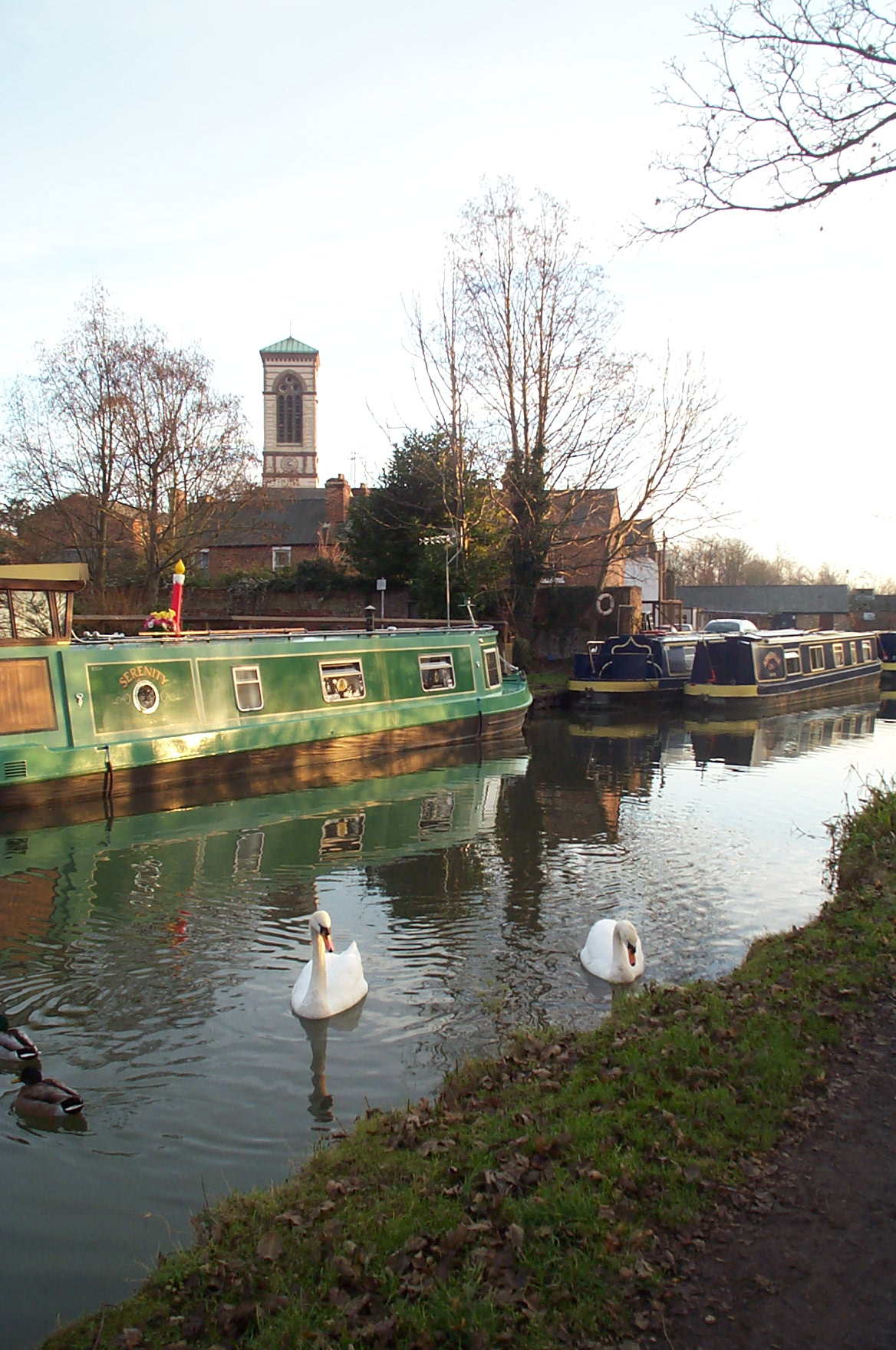
View of the campanile from the northwest across the Oxford Canal.
