= Charles Allston Collins =

English painter

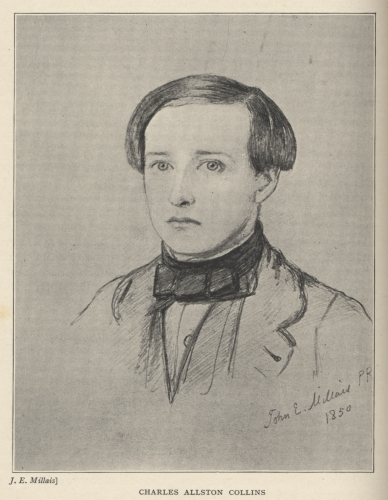
Charles Allston Collins by John Everett Millais in 1850

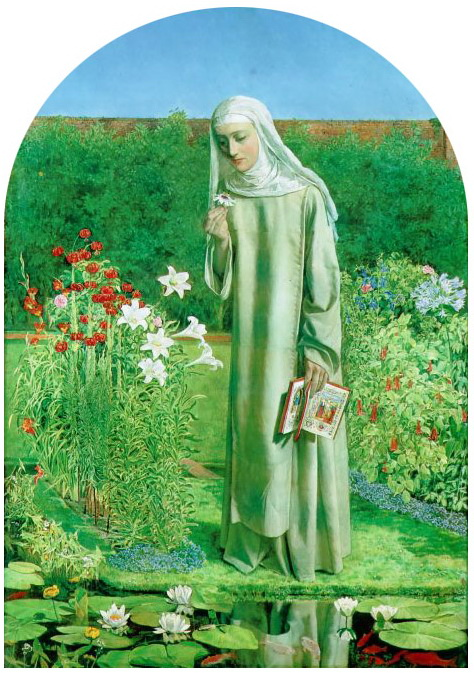
Convent Thoughts (1850–51); Ashmolean Museum, Oxford

Charles Allston Collins (London 25 January 1828 – 9 April 1873) was a British painter, writer, and illustrator associated with the Pre-Raphaelite Brotherhood.

== Life and work ==
=== Early years ===
Collins was born in Hampstead, north London, the son of landscape and genre painter William Collins. His older brother was the novelist Wilkie Collins. He was educated at Stonyhurst College in Lancashire.

=== Painting career ===
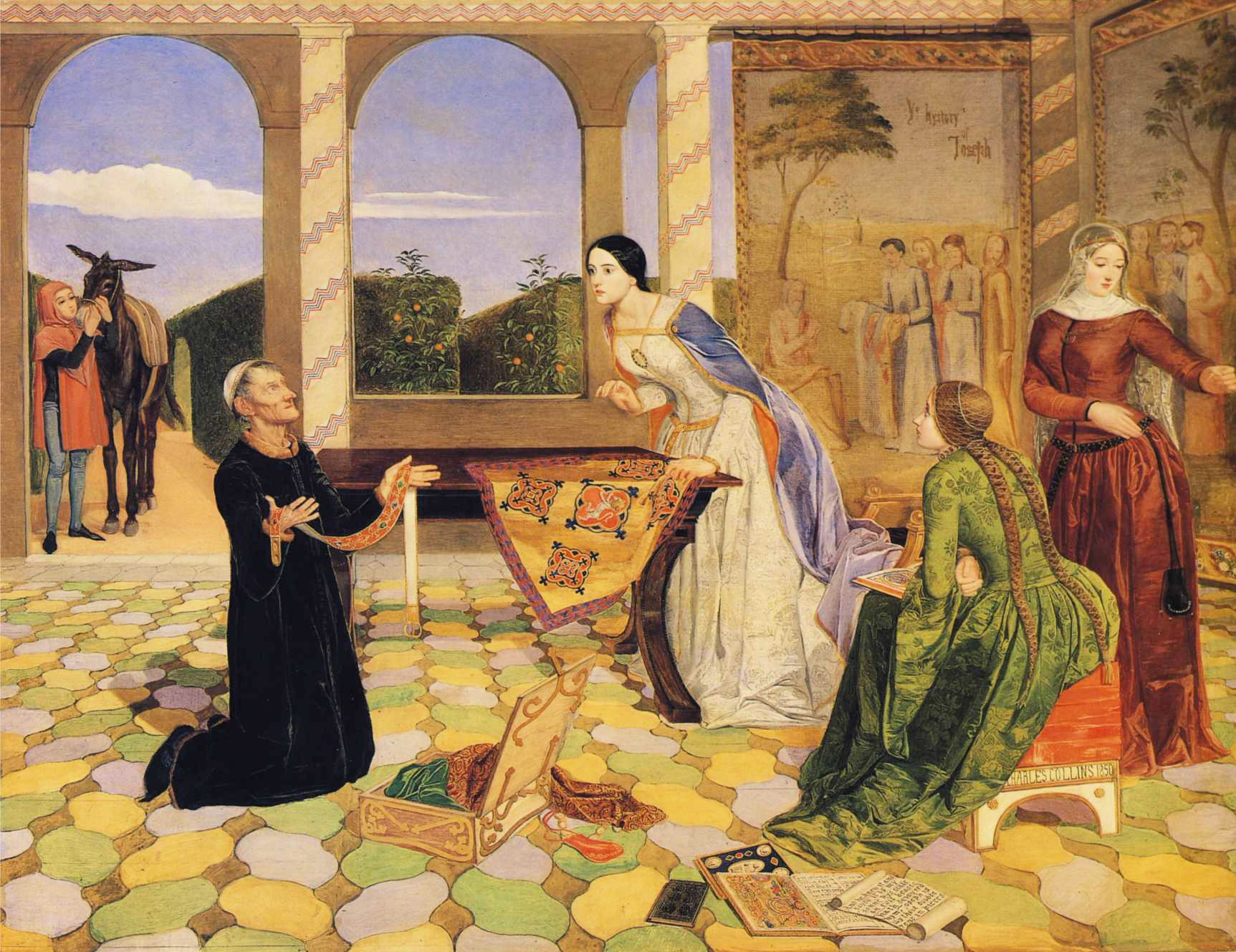
Berengaria's Alarm, 1850

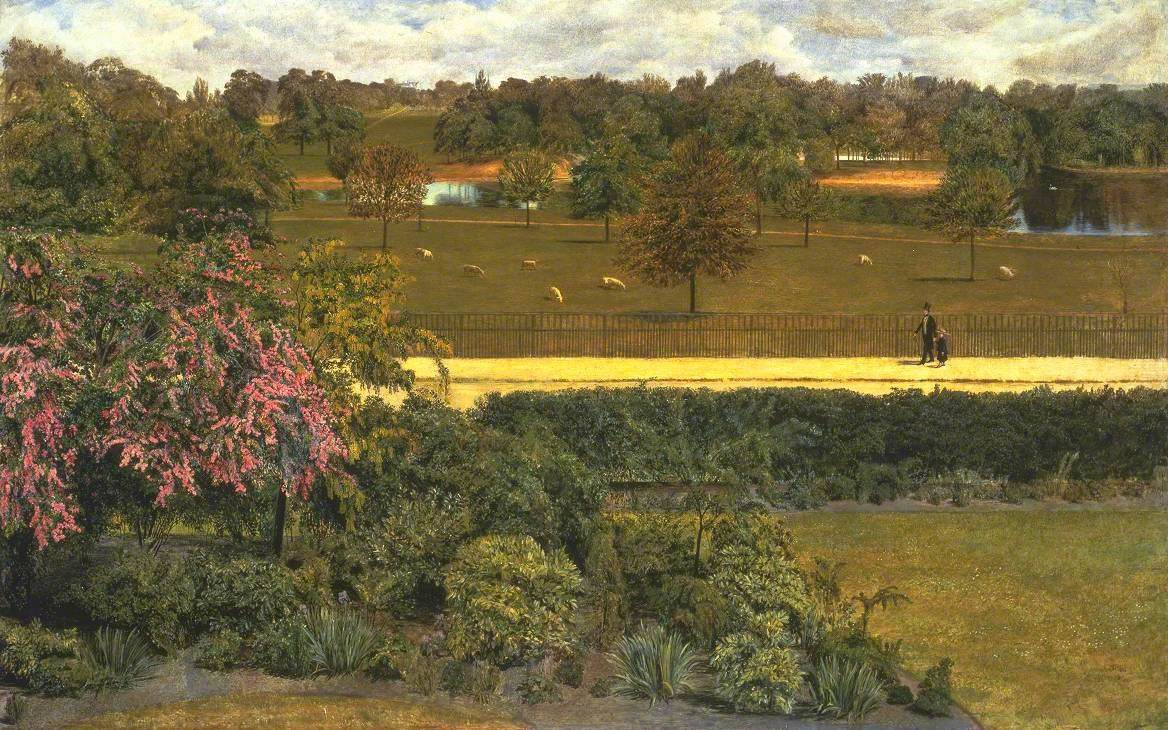
May, in the Regent's Park, 1851

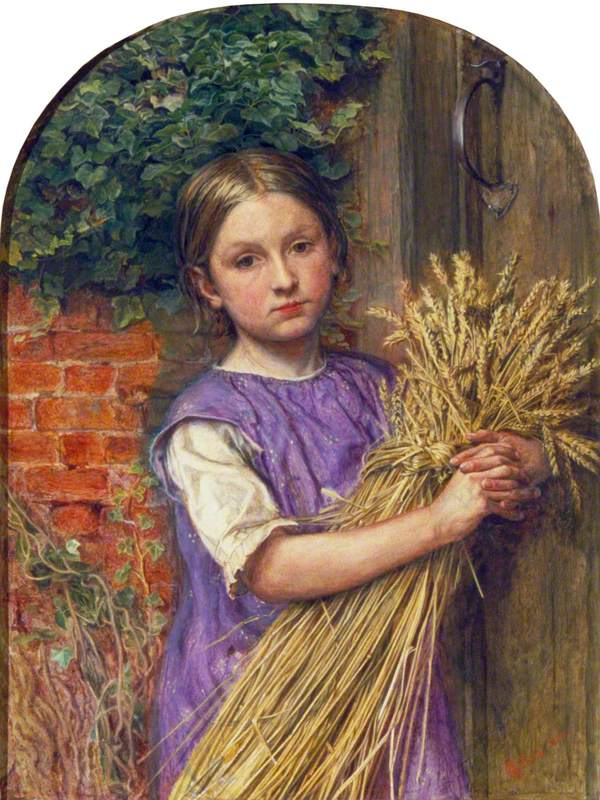
The Good Harvest of 1854, 1854

Collins met John Everett Millais and became influenced by the ideas of the Pre-Raphaelites, completing his painting Berengaria's Alarm in 1850. This depicted the wife of King Richard the Lionheart noticing her missing husband's girdle offered for sale by a peddlar. The flattened modelling, emphasis on pattern making, and imagery of embroidery were all characteristic features of Pre-Raphaelitism. Millais proposed that Collins should become a member of the Brotherhood, but Thomas Woolner and William Michael Rossetti objected, so he never became an official member.

Collins fell in love with Maria Francesca Rossetti, but she rejected him. He became increasingly ascetic and introspective. These attitudes were expressed in Collins's best-known work, Convent Thoughts, which depicted a nun in a convent garden. Collins went on to exhibit many highly devotional images.

=== Literary career ===
In the late 1850s, however, he abandoned art to follow his brother into a writing career. His most successful literary works were humorous essays collected together under the title The Eye Witness (1860).

=== Later life ===
Collins married Charles Dickens's daughter Kate in 1860, and later was engaged to illustrate Dickens's unfinished novel The Mystery of Edwin Drood. He completed the cover but was too ill to do the rest, which were taken over by Luke Fildes. He died from cancer in 1873 and is buried in Brompton Cemetery, London. He was 45 years old.

== See also ==
- List of Pre-Raphaelite paintings
