= Manuel John Johnson =

British astronomer

Manuel John Johnson, FRS (23 May 1805 – 28 February 1859) was a British astronomer.

He was born in Macao, China, the son of John William Roberts of the East India Company and was educated at Mr Styles' Classical Academy in Thames Ditton and at the Addiscombe Military Seminary for service in the East India Company (the HEIC).

In 1823 he was sent by the HEIC to St Helena, where from 1826 he supervised the building of the Ladder Hill Observatory. He travelled twice to South Africa to consult with Fearon Fallows on the design of the observatory. In 1828 he was made Superintendent of the Observatory. In 1835 he published A Catalogue of 606 Principal Fixed Stars in the Southern Hemisphere... at St. Helena, for which he won the Gold Medal of the Royal Astronomical Society that same year. While comparing his results with those of Nicolas Louis de Lacaille he noted the high proper motion of Alpha Centauri and communicated these to Thomas Henderson at the Royal Observatory, Cape of Good Hope. This led to the first successful measurement of a stellar parallax, though not to the first publication thereof.

On his return to the UK in 1833 he went up to Magdalen Hall, Oxford, graduating MA in 1839. He then served as director of the Radcliffe Observatory from 1839 until his death in Oxford in 1859. He introduced there self-registering meteorological instruments to continuously record variations in atmospheric pressure, temperature, humidity and atmospheric electricity using the recent invention of photography. The initial instruments were invented and installed by Francis Ronalds, Honorary Director of the Kew Observatory. The Radcliffe Observatory later became part of the network of observing stations established as part of the new Meteorological Office and coordinated from Kew.

Johnson was president of the Royal Astronomical Society in 1855–1857 and was elected Fellow of the Royal Society in 1856.

In 1850 he married Caroline (born 1822), the daughter of James Adey Ogle, regius professor of medicine at Oxford, and his wife Sarah. Caroline's twin sister Amelia married James Bowling Mozley, regius professor of divinity at Oxford. After the death of Johnson and (in 1872) Amelia, Caroline lived with Mozley and assisted in his parish work at Shoreham. She died in 1881.
