= Thomas Combe =

Printer and patron of the arts

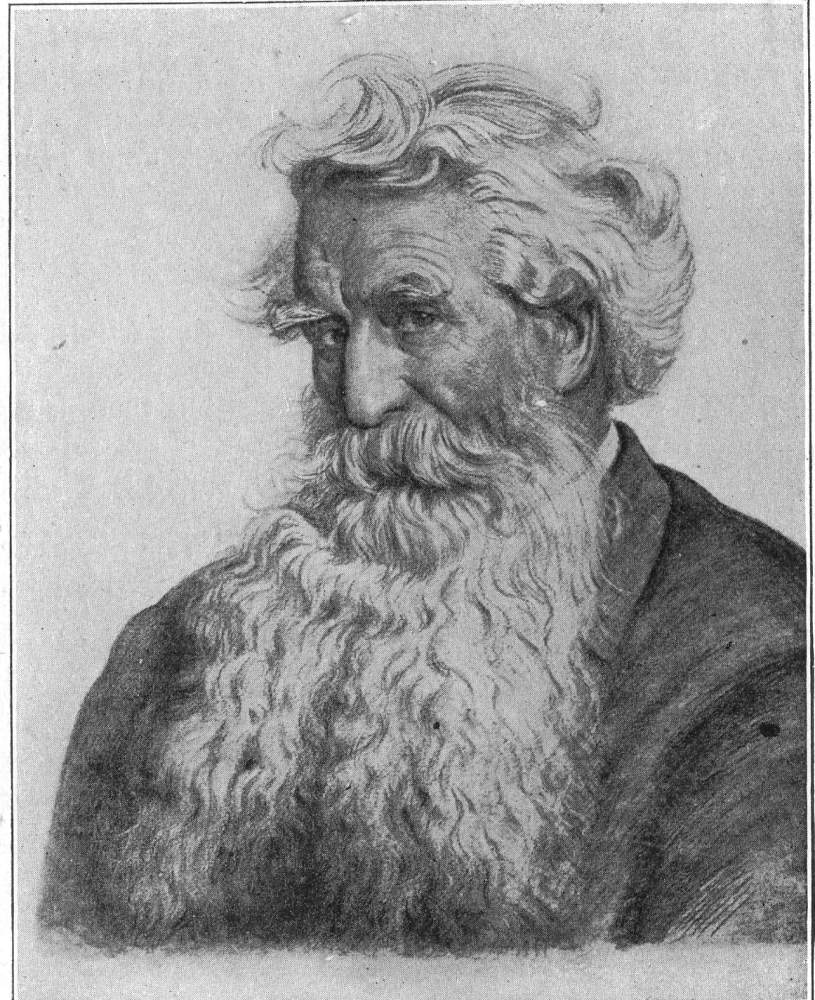
- Thomas Combe, by W Holman Hunt
- Born: 1797
- Died: 30 June 1872
- Occupation: Book publisher
- Known for: Oxford University Press; St Barnabas Church, Oxford
- Spouse(s): Martha Combe, m.1840-1872, his death.

Thomas Combe (1796 – 30 June 1872) was a British printer, publisher and patron of the arts. He was 'Printer to the University' at Oxford University Press, and was also a founder and benefactor of St Barnabas Church, near the Press in Jericho and close to Oxford Canal.

== Life ==
Combe was the son of Thomas Combe senior (died 1836?), a printer, stationer, bookseller and newspaper proprietor in Leicester. After working with his father and, between around 1824 and 1826 with Joseph Parker in Oxford, he was freed by the Stationers' Company and went into business in his own right.

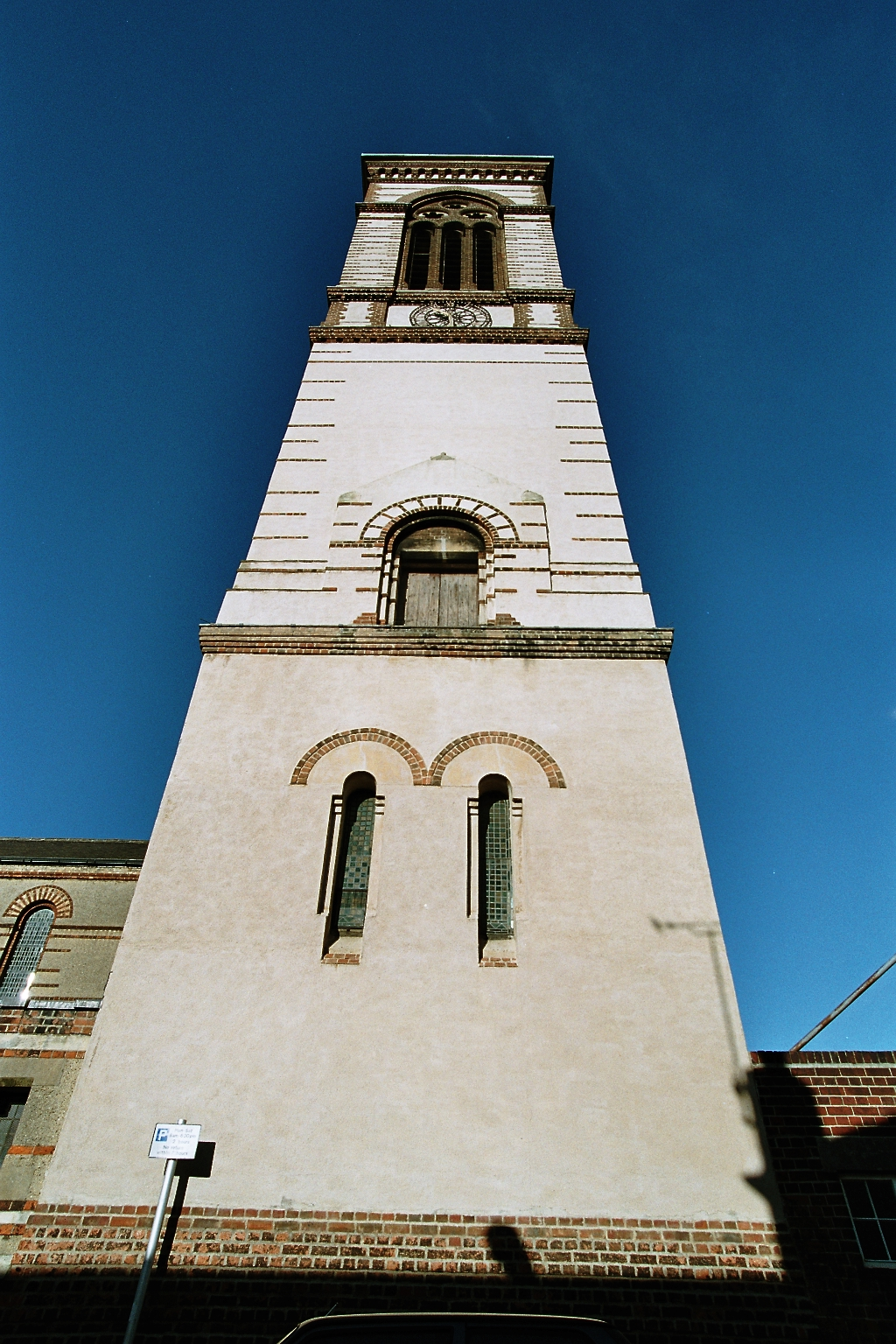
The campanile of St Barnabas Church, Oxford, founded by Thomas Combe and his wife Martha.

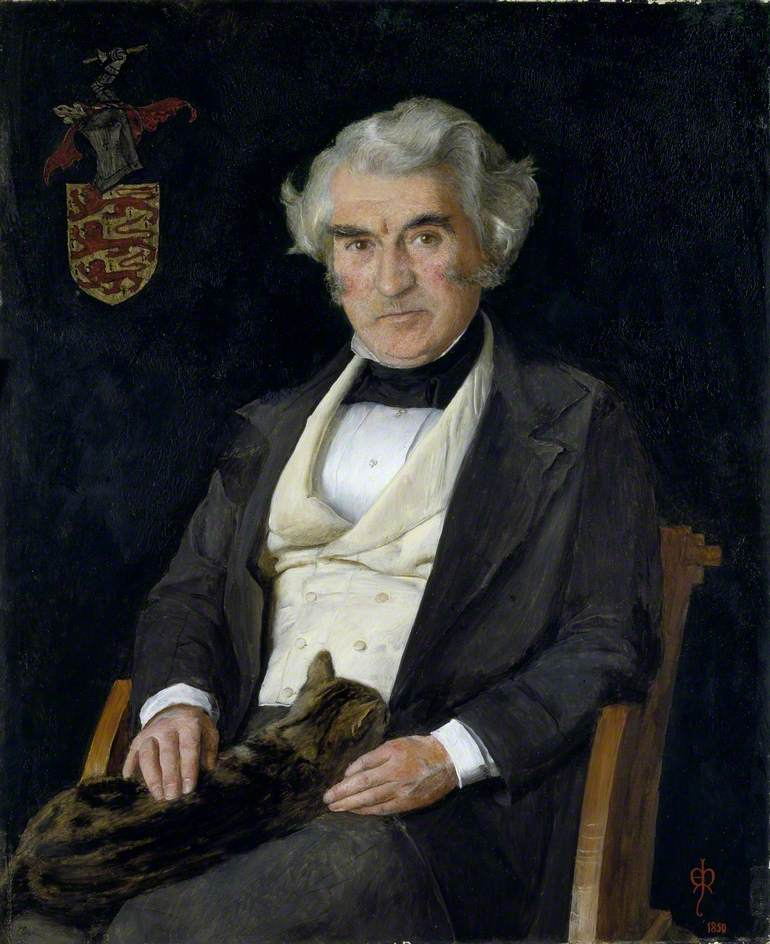
Thomas Combe by John Everett Millais, 1850.

In 1826, he was briefly in partnership with Michael Angelo Nattali in London, but before the end of the year he had returned to Leicester to join the family business (which was styled T. Combe and Son between 1826 and 1835). After his father's death he moved to Oxford, and joined the University Press (or Clarendon Press) in 1837 at its then new (1830) building in Walton Street. By 1838, he was superintendent of the 'learned side' of the press, and soon acquired shares in the business. By 1851, he was senior partner in the Press. As a result, he amassed a considerable fortune.

He and his wife Martha (1806–1893) were keen patrons of the arts and particularly of the Pre-Raphaelites. In 1849, he met John Everett Millais in Oxford, who painted portraits of Combe's family. They were also devotees of the Tractarian or Oxford Movement.

He died on 30 June 1872. Combe is buried in St Sepulchre's Cemetery, off Walton Street, near the University Press. His widow retained and expanded his collection of Pre-Raphaelite art. On her death in 1893, the bulk of the collection was bequeathed to the university and is now in the Ashmolean Museum.

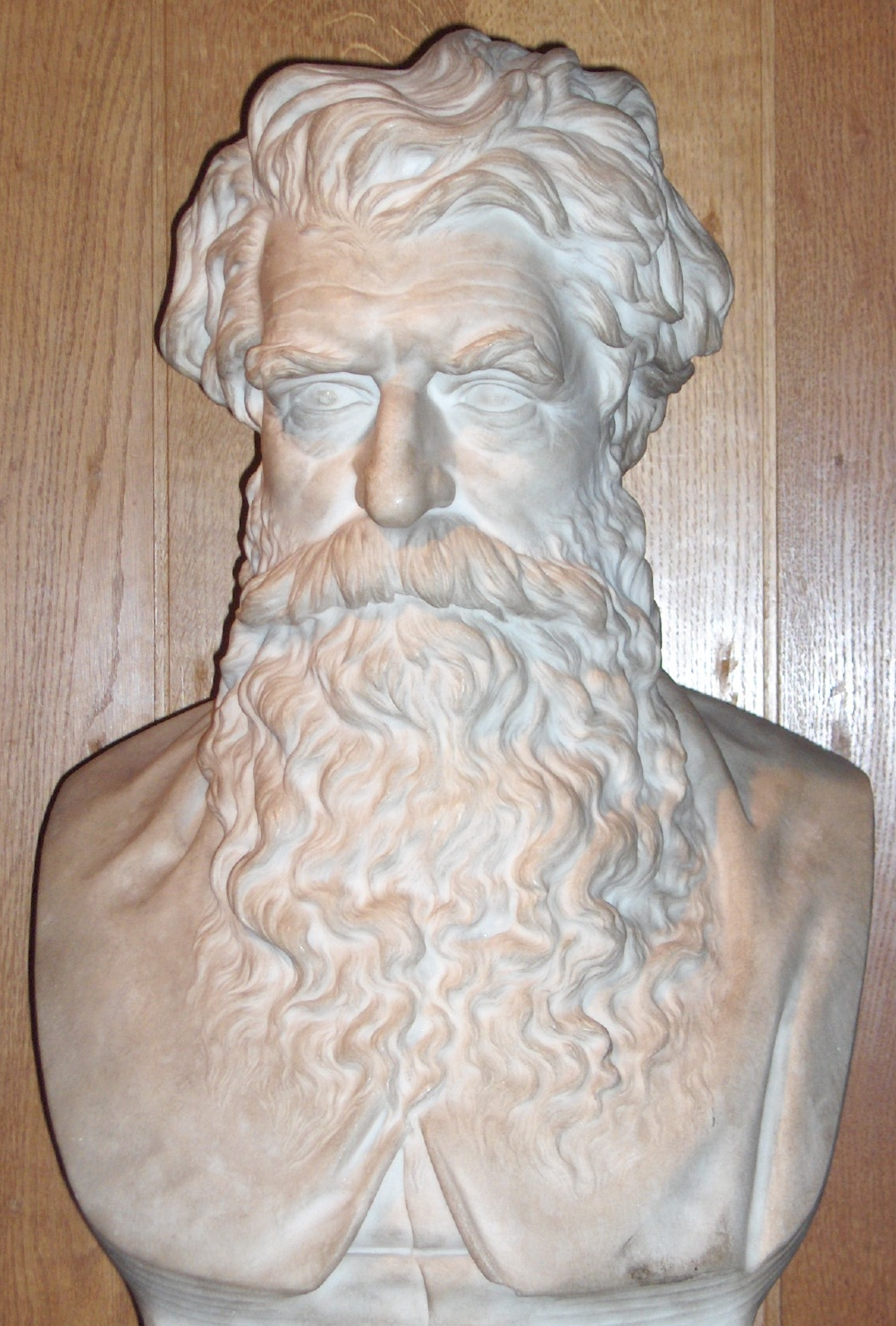
Bust of Thomas Combe by Thomas Woolner, 1863, on display at the Ashmolean Museum in Oxford.

A blue plaque on the outside wall of St Barnabas Church installed by the Oxfordshire Blue Plaques Board now commemorates Thomas Combe and his wife Martha as founders of the church.
