= John Ludlow =

John Ludlow may refer to:

- John de Ludlow, medieval Chancellor of the University of Oxford
- John Malcolm Forbes Ludlow, English lawyer and leader of the Christian socialist movement
- John Ludlow (MP) for Oxford in 1395
- John Ludlow (theologian) (1793–1857), a 19th-century clergyman, theologian, and professor at New Brunswick Theological Seminary and Rutgers College
