= List of mayors of Oxford =

The Mayor of Oxford is an official with oversight of the administration of the city of Oxford, England. The earliest recorded mayor of Oxford was Laurence Kepeharm (1205–1207?).

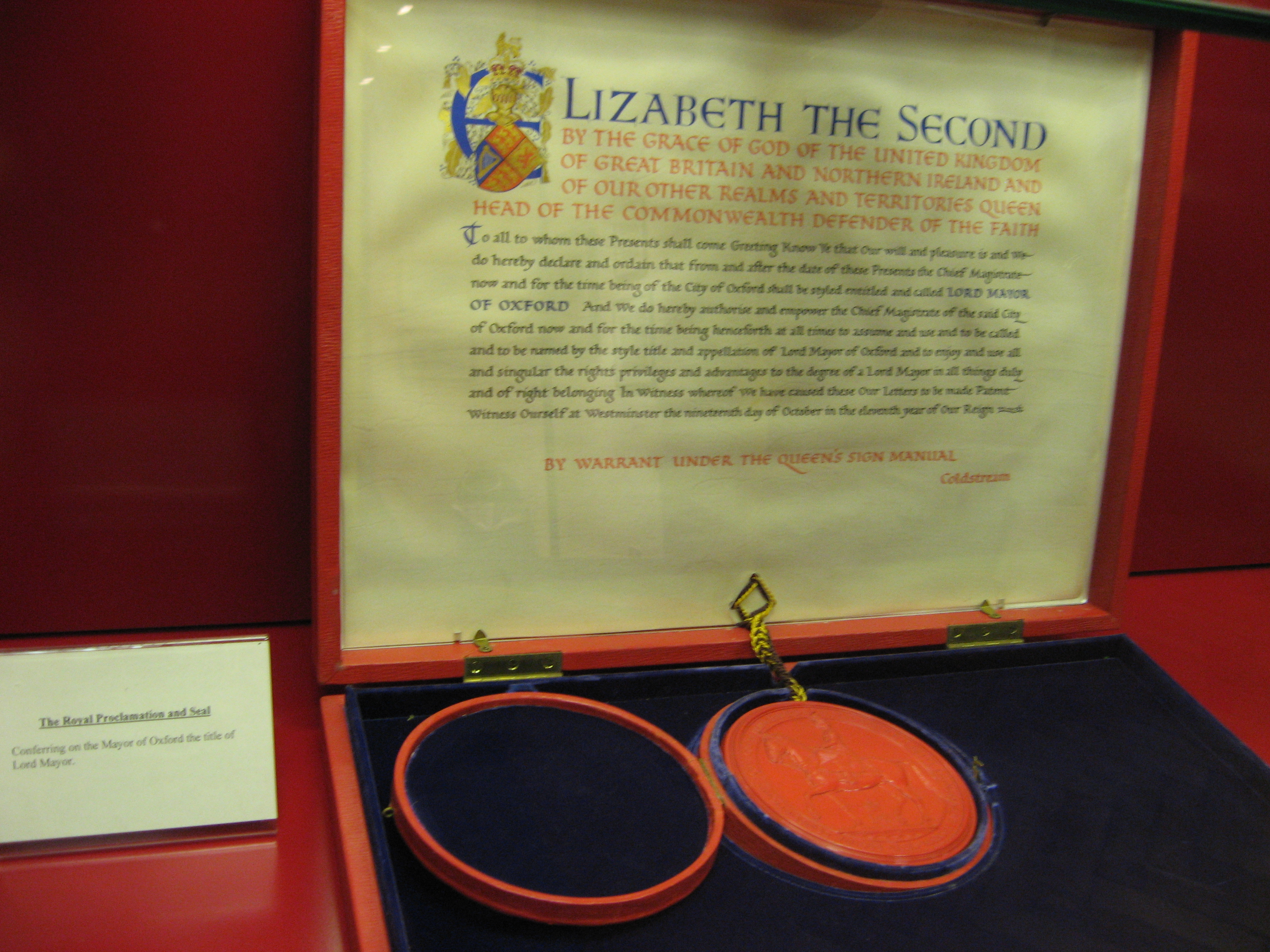
Royal proclamation granting Lord Mayoralty to Oxford

On 23 October 1962, the city was granted the honour of electing a Lord Mayor. Notable figures who have been Lord Mayor of Oxford include J. N. L. Baker (1964–65), Air-Vice-Marshal William Foster MacNeece Foster (1966–67) and Olive Gibbs (1974–75 and 1981–82).

== List of notable mayors ==
Year	Name	Notes
1319/1323	John Hampton	Owner of Hampton Hall, Oxford
1392/1393	Thomas Somerset	MP for Oxford, 1379, 1388
1395/1396	John Shawe	MP for Oxford, 1388
1400/1401	John Merston	MP for Oxford, 1393, 1404 and 1414
1401/1402	Edmund Kenyan	MP for Oxford, 9 times between 1379 and 1394
1403/1404	John Merston	
1412	John Merston	
1420/1423	William Brampton	MP for Oxford, 1416, 1419, 1421 and 1425
1424/1425	William Offord	MP for Oxford, 1420, 1421, 1422 and 1426
1425/1426	William Brampton	
1426/1427	William Offord	
1430/1432	William Brampton	
1436/1437	William Brampton	
1438/1439	William Brampton	
1527/1529	William Fleming	MP for Oxford, 1529 and ?1536
1556/1557	William Tylcock	MP for Oxford, 1554
1557/1558	Thomas Williams	MP for Oxford, 1553
1560/1561	William Tylcock	
1563/1564	Roger Taylor	MP for Oxford, 1559
1565/1566	Thomas Williams	
1568/1569	William Tylcock	
1569/1570	Roger Taylor	
1574/1575	Roger Taylor	
1575/1576	William Tylcock	
1576/1577	Thomas Williams	
1587/1588	Thomas Rowe	Plague mayor, alderman and coroner
1593/1594	Thomas Rowe	Plague mayor, alderman and coroner
1636	John Nixon	MP for Oxford, 1646
1646/1648	John Nixon	
1654	John Nixon	
1698	John Knibb	Clockmaker
1710	John Knibb	
1813	Joseph Lock (1760–1844)	Banker and goldsmith
1829	Joseph Lock, Kt. (1760–1844)	Banker and goldsmith
1836 (Jan–Oct)	William Henry Butler	Wine merchant
1842/1843	James Wyatt	Gilder, printseller, art dealer, art curator
1851/1852	William Ward	Coal merchant
1859/1860	Thomas Randall	Magistrate, Hatter of Randall & Nichols
1861/1862	William Ward	
1865/1866	John Cavell	Draper of Elliston & Cavell Ltd
1874/1875	Joseph Round	Coal merchant
1875/1876	Jason Saunders	
1877/1888	John Cavell	
1879/1880 (part)	John Cavell	
1891/1892	Frederick William Ansell	Music Seller (shop proprietor)
1900/1901	George Claridge Druce	Botanist
1901/1902	Walter Gray	Alderman
1902/1903	John H. Salter	Alderman, Liberal
1907/1908	Frederick William Ansell	Music Seller (shop proprietor) & Alderman
1909	Arthur Salter, 1st Baron Salter	Academic. MP for Oxford University, 1937 and Ormskirk, 1951
1933/1934	Lily Sophia Tawney	First woman
1938/1939	Henry Tregelles Gillett	Doctor and prominent Quaker
1959/1960	Frederick Mason Brewer	Research chemist at the University of Oxford

== List of Lord Mayors ==
By modern convention, Oxford City Council elects the longest-serving councillor (not having served already) as Lord Mayor. The term of the office is for one year and can only be held once.

Year	Name	Notes
1962/1963	Evan Owen Roberts	First Lord Mayor
1963/1964	Alec Percival Parker	
1964/1965	John Leonard Norman Baker	University Councillor
1965/1966	Florence Kathleen Lower	First woman Lord Mayor
1966/1967	William Foster MacNeece Foster	Air Vice-Marshal
1967/1968	Francis (Frank) Vincent Pickstock	
1968/1969	Peter Spencer Spokes	
1969/1970	Percy Dudley Bromley	
1970/1971	Michael Maclagan	University Councillor
1971/1972	Thomas James Meadows	
1972/1973	Arthur Bernard Connors	
1973/1974	Frederick George Ingram	
1974/1975	Olive Frances Gibbs	
1975/1976	William George Robert Fagg	
1976/1977	Ann Hazel Spokes	Later Ann Spokes Symonds
1977/1978	Dora Minnie Carr	
1978/1979	William Eaton Simpson	
1979/1980	John Arundell Hamilton	
1980/1981	Gordon Woodward	
1981/1982	Henry Briskol Nicholson Myers Nimmo died in office December 1981 and replaced by Olive Frances Gibbs	
1982/1983	Anthony William Williamson	
1983/1984	Janet Gillespie Todd	
1984/1985	Frank Arnold Garside	
1985/1986	Roger Alan Dudman	
1986/1987	John George William Parker	
1987/1988	Elizabeth Florence Mary Standingford	In place of her husband Bert who died on 19 May 1987 when Lord Mayor Elect
1988/1989	Nellie Dorothy Whorley	Later Nellie Comfort
1989/1990	Patricia Anne Tempest Yardley	
1990/1991	Queenie Lewingdon Hamilton	
1991/1992	Alan David Pope	
1992/1993	Barbara May Gatehouse	
1993/1994	John Gordon Power	
1994/1995	William Walker Buckingham	
1995/1996	Joseph Charles Blewitt	
1996/1997	Beryl Ivy Keen	
1997/1998	William John Baker	
1998/1999	Carol Roberts	
1999/2000	Valerie Smith	
2000/2001	Maureen Christian	
2001/2002	Peter Moss	
2002/2003	Gillian Ann Sanders	
2003/2004	Patrick Stannard	
2004/2005	Bryan Keen	
2005/2006	Robert John Price	
2006/2007	Jim Campbell	
2007/2008	John Tanner	
2008/2009	Susanna Pressel	
2009/2010	Mary Clarkson	
2010/2011	John Goddard	
2011/2012	Elise Benjamin	
2012/2013	Alan Armitage resigned 4 March 2012 and replaced 13 March 2013 by Mohammed Abbasi	
2013/2014	Dee Sinclair	
2014/2015	Mohammed Abbasi	
2015/2016	Rae Humberstone	
2016/2017	Mohammed Altaf-Khan	
2017/2018	Jean Fooks	
2018/2019	Colin Cook	
2019/2020	Craig Simmons	
2020/2022	Mark Lygo	
2022/2023	James Fry	
2023/2024	Lubna Arshad	
2024/2025	Mike Rowley	First openly gay Lord Mayor.
