= Robert Oakeshott =

English journalist

Robert Noel Waddington Oakeshott (26 July 1933 – 21 June 2011) was an English journalist, economist and social reformer who championed a form of workers' co-operation called Employee Ownership. He also had a deep passion for Africa and worked in Zambia and Botswana in the early years of their independence.

== Early life ==
Robert Oakeshott, together with his twin brother Evelyn, was born in 1933 in Winchester, Hampshire, the son of Walter Oakeshott and Noel Oakeshott. His father was headmaster of Winchester College, his mother an expert on Greek antiquities. Robert attended Tonbridge School and completed his studies at Balliol College, Oxford, where he studied classics and political economy.

His early life was marked by two overseas adventures. After leaving school he was conscripted into the National Service and posted to the British forces fighting an anticolonial rebellion in Malaya. Oakeshott became, very briefly, a cavalry officer in charge of armoured cars.

During his Oxford years, in 1956, an anti-Soviet uprising broke out in Hungary. Oakeshott and a fellow student made a goodwill visit to Budapest, taking a consignment of medical supplies. Afterwards, he and group at Balliol raised substantial funds for refugee relief. Fifty years later the Hungarian government made him a Hero of the Revolution.

After completing Oxford in 1957, Oakeshott signed on with the Sunderland Echo and found a lifelong vocation for journalism. He soon moved up to the Financial Times, where he discovered the true workings of market capitalism. Once, he recounted later, he was sent on assignment to South Africa and was granted a secret meeting with Nelson Mandela. In 1963 he became the FT's Paris correspondent. A year later, he abandoned his familiar world and sought out newly independent Africa.

== Overseas work ==
Oakeshott moved to Northern Rhodesia just before its independence as Zambia and began work as a government economist in Lusaka. He participated in two landmark events: the publication of the Transitional Development Plan and the takeover of the country's mineral rights from the British South Africa Company, a holdover from the colonial era. In the struggle between African and colonial interests, he always took the African point of view, often tenaciously. Angry white Rhodesians once threw him off a train during a drunken quarrel about race; he was bloodied but mostly uninjured.

At the beginning of 1966, Jo Grimond, an old friend and then leader of the UK Liberal Party, persuaded Oakeshott to fly back to England to stand in the general election for the Liberals in Darlington. His election manifesto called both for the UK's accession to the European Common Market and for effective measures against the [white-supremacist] "rebellion in Southern Rhodesia". It proved to be a valiant but sacrificial campaign, as the Labour Party candidate won handily, and Oakeshott returned to Zambia.

Pursuing an invitation, he visited Swaneng Hill School, a pioneering experiment in self-help education in Serowe, Bechuanaland, an impoverished British protectorate nearing its independence as Botswana. Although he travelled there as a journalist, he was immediately moved by what he saw and asked the school's founder, Patrick van Rensburg, if he could work there. In November 1966 he joined the staff as a teacher, planner, and author of a textbook in Development Studies, an attempt to explain economics from the point of view of aspiring third-world readers.

In mid-1967 he became the first manager of the Serowe Farmer's Brigade, a vocational training project that was part of the broader group of Serowe Brigades. A year later he was appointed the founding principal of a sister secondary school, Shashe River School, to be built in Tonota, Botswana.

Shashe River School and associated brigades opened early in 1969. Although he was popular locally, he was soon in conflict with the Botswana Ministry of Education. He resigned after two years of bureaucratic frustration and returned to Britain at the end of 1971.

== Employee ownership ==
Upon his return to the UK, Oakeshott threw himself into building workers' co-operatives, a cause that remained his mission for the next three decades. In 1973 he was the driving force in launching Sunderlandia, a builders' co-operative in Sunderland that for several years attempted to put egalitarian principles into action. Oakeshott drafted its initial articles of association, which were later compared to the Communist Manifesto.

Although Sunderlandia eventually succumbed to economic downturn and internal divisions, it broke down many old prejudices. Its membership included a high proportion of apprentices, and women were recruited to become bricklayers and joiners. Oakeshott himself regularly contributed unskilled labour on the construction sites, following a custom acquired in Botswana.

Following the dissolution of Sunderlandia, Oakeshott moved to London and began a systematic survey of worker's co-operatives. In particular he studied Mondragón, the large co-operative complex in the Basque region of Spain. During this period he wrote two further books on the subject: The Case for Workers' Cooperatives and Jobs and Fairness: The Logic and Experience of Employee Ownership.

In 1979 Oakeshott founded Job Ownership Limited (JOL), a consultancy to advise on industrial co-ops and conversion to the employee-owned model. During the 1980s he proselytised with great energy and considerable success. In 2006 he and his colleagues renamed JOL as the Employee Ownership Association (EOA). In 2015 the EOA counted over 100 member companies, growing at 10% per year, with a total annual turnover approaching £30 billion.

In the 1990s, as businesses throughout Eastern Europe reorganised along market lines, Oakeshott persuaded the UK Foreign Office to give grants to JOL to promote employee ownership in several ex-communist countries. Its principles had obvious appeal, and Oakeshott enjoyed a number of successes, particularly with a wine co-operative in Bulgaria into which he poured personal funds.

In 1999 Oakeshott retired as director of JOL. Treasured by his associates, he remained committed to the employee ownership movement until his death.

== Charitable initiatives ==
"What is the good society?" Oakeshott often asked in conversation. His involvement with charitable organisations of all kinds provided in part an answer. He took up a wide range of causes, including girls’ education in Africa (Camfed), prisoners' embroidery in Britain (Fine Cell Work), youth unemployment, refugees in Cairo, the facilitation of organ transplants (Give a Kidney), and multiple acts of private charity.

== Personal life ==
Aside from a love of drinking, Oakeshott was renowned for hewing to a spartan regime. Ever supportive of others, he never found a companion for his own inner life. In his forties he briefly married Catherine Shuckburgh, but the marriage was quickly annulled by mutual consent.

Until late in his life Oakeshott remained a regular contributor to The Spectator and The Economist, often writing reviews of books touching on Africa. In mid-2010 he suffered a stroke that forced him into institutional care, and he died a year later. He was survived by his twin brother Evelyn, his two sisters Helena and Rose, and seven nieces and two nephews.

The Sunderland Home Care Associates have announced an annual Robert Oakeshott Award. His family and friends have created scholarships for African students in his name, and together with the Employee Ownership Association, have underwritten an annual Robert Oakeshott Memorial Lecture. In March 2013 the then Deputy Prime Minister Nick Clegg gave the inaugural memorial lecture, in which he emphasised his government's commitment to employee ownership.

== Writings ==
The works cited below are a small selection; Robert Oakeshott's formal and informal writings, together with his correspondence, are voluminous.

- Oakeshott, Robert; Campbell, Alastair; Keen, Charles; Norman, Geraldine (1978). Worker Owners: The Mondragon Achievement. The Caja Laboral Popular and The Mondragon Co-Operatives in the Basque Provinces of Spain. London, UK: The Anglo-German Foundation for the Study of Industrial Society. ISBN 090549203X.
- Oakeshott, Robert (1978). The Case for Workers' Cooperatives. London, UK: Routledge & Kegan Paul Books. ISBN 9780710000415.
- Oakeshott, Robert; Wiener, Hans (1987). Work-owners: Mondragon Revisited. London, UK: The Anglo-German Foundation for the Study of Industrial Society. ISBN 9780905492469.
- Oakeshott, Robert (2000). Jobs and Fairness: The Logic and Experience of Employee Ownership. Norwich, UK: Michael Russell Publishing Ltd. ISBN 9780859552561.
- Oakeshott, Robert (5 March 2005). "Mau Mau and all that" (Book review of three histories of colonial Kenya). The Spectator.
