= Thomas Somerset (disambiguation) =

Thomas Somerset (by 1529–1586) was MP for Monmouthshire, Catholic prisoner under Elizabeth I.

Thomas Somerset may also refer to:

- Thomas Somerset (MP for Oxford), 14th century MP for Oxford and mayor
- Thomas Somerset, 1st Viscount Somerset (1579–1651), English politician
- Thomas Somerset (Northern Ireland politician) (1870–1947), Northern Irish Member of Parliament
