= John Astley (Master of the Revels) =

English courtier and politician (c. 1569–1640)

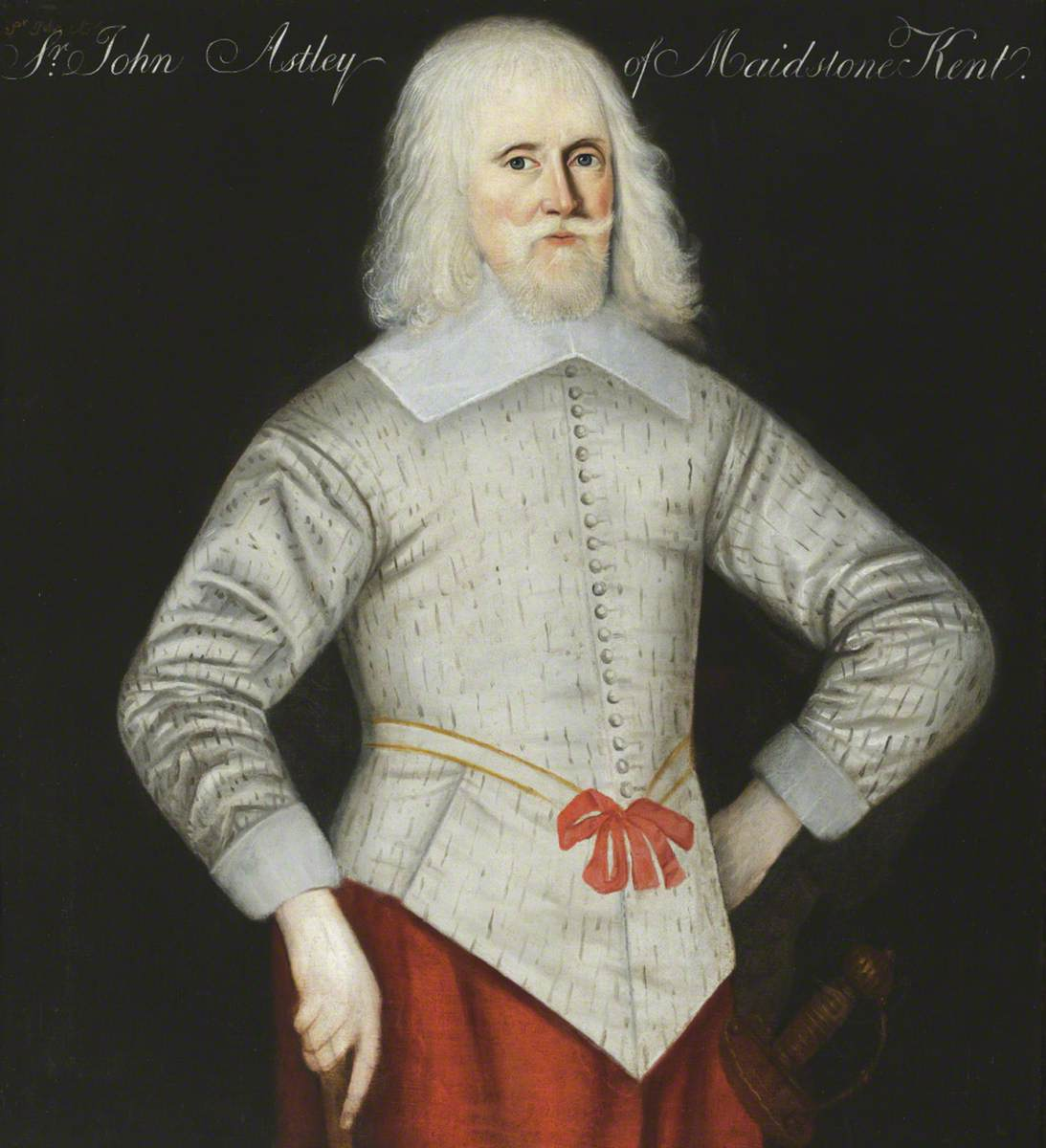
Portrait of John Astley

Sir John Astley (or Ashley) (c.1569 – 26 January 1640) was an English courtier and politician who sat in the House of Commons in 1614 and became Master of the Revels.

Astley was the son of John Astley, Master of the Jewel House and his wife Margaret Grey, illegitimate daughter of Lord Thomas Grey. He was educated at the royal court of Elizabeth I and was a law student at Grays Inn in 1598. He was a gentleman pensioner under Queen Elizabeth and her successor James I until about 1612, while in the meantime he succeeded to his father's estates at Maidstone in 1596.

He was knighted at the Charterhouse on 11 May 1603. In 1612 he was granted the reversion of Mastership of the Revels. In 1614, he was elected Member of Parliament for Oxford to serve in the Addled Parliament. He was deputy Master of the Revels and was commissioned on 6 May 1622 to take up embroiderers, tailors and other artificers for the King's service. On 22 May 1622 he succeeded Sir George Buck, who had gone mad, as Master of the Revels but sold his interest to Henry Herbert by August 1623.

On 18 September 1609 Astley married Katherine Brydges, daughter of Anthony Brydges of Sudeley Castle, Gloucestershire. Their children, three sons and a daughter, all died during the lifetime of their father, who was succeeded in his estates by his kinsman Sir Jacob Astley. Astley died in 1640. His wife survived him, dying in 1648.

Parliament of England
Preceded by Francis Leigh; Thomas Wentworth	Member of Parliament for Oxford; 1614; With: Thomas Wentworth	Succeeded by Sir John Brooke; Thomas Wentworth
