= Richard Lowther =

Richard Lowther may refer to:

- Sir Richard Lowther (1532–1608), twice High Sheriff of Cumberland and Lord Warden of the West March
- Richard Lowther (died 1703) (1638–1703), MP for Appleby 1689–1690
- Richard Lowther, 2nd Viscount Lonsdale (1692–1713), English nobleman
- Richard Lowther (died 1659) (1583–1659), English lawyer
- Richard Lowther (1602-1645), English politician
- Richard Lowther (1692-1721), English noblemen & Captain
