= Christ Church Old Buildings =

Tenement building in West Oxford, England

- Christ Church Old Buildings, with Osney Lane to the left and The Hamel to the right

General information
- Type: Public housing apartment building
- Location: Oxford, United Kingdom
- Coordinates: 51.75112°N 1.26595°W
- Completed: 1866

The Christ Church Old Buildings are an early example of social housing situated in the St Thomas' neighbourhood to the west of the centre of the English city of Oxford. They were built in 1866 and are the only surviving example of this type of early social housing in Oxford. The buildings are bounded by Woodbine Place, Osney Lane and The Hamel.

The buildings are part of an initiative in the mid-19th century to improve working-class housing conditions. This initiative involved the development of model dwellings in The Hamel and brick cottages along Osney Lane, and was intended to address overcrowding and unsanitary conditions in the St Thomas’ area.

The buildings were the birthplace of Olive Gibbs, born Olive Frances Cox in 1918, a local councillor who was twice the Lord Mayor of Oxford and was also chair of the Campaign for Nuclear Disarmament. The buildings are still used for residential purposes, and a blue plaque relates their relationship with Gibbs.
