= Robert Oswald Moon =

Robert Oswald Moon FRCP JP
- Born: 17 March 1865
- Died: 28 July 1953 (aged 88)
- Education: Winchester School; New College, Oxford

Robert Oswald Moon FRCP JP (17 March 1865 – 28 July 1953), was a British physician, writer and Liberal Party politician.

== Background ==
He was born on 17 March 1865 in London, the youngest son of Robert Moon, a barrister and academic, and a nephew of the railway executive Richard Moon. He was educated at Winchester School and New College, Oxford. His medical training was at Guy's Hospital. He married Ethel Waddington. They had one son and three daughters. Ethel died in 1933.

== Medical career ==
In 1897 he became Surgeon to the Phil-Hellenic Legion in the Græco-Turkish War. In 1900 he was a Trooper in the Hampshire Yeomanry in South Africa. In 1901 he was Civil Surgeon for the Field Force in South Africa. In 1909 he was senior physician at the Western General Dispensary. He wrote a number of books on medical subjects. In 1915 he was Chadwick Lecturer on Typhus in Serbia. In 1917 he joined the Royal Army Medical Corps with the temporary rank of Major. He was a consulting physician to the Royal Waterloo Hospital and senior physician to the National Hospital for Diseases of the Heart. He became a Fellow of the Royal College of Physicians in 1909.

== Political career ==
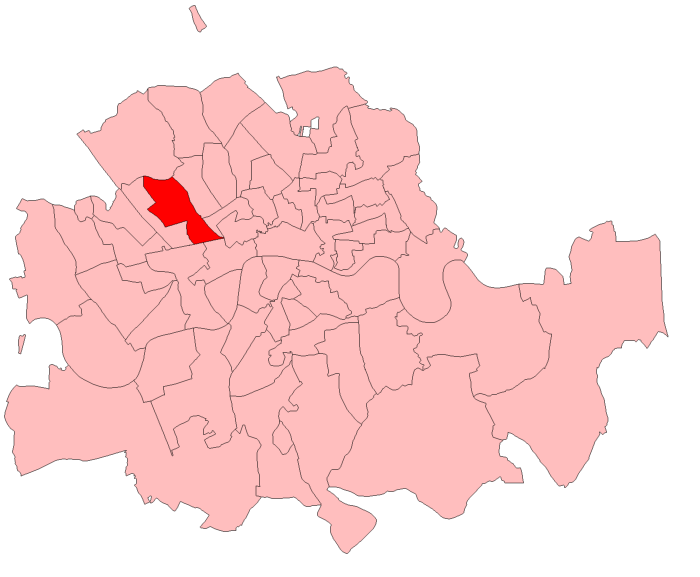
Marylebone East in the London County area, showing boundaries used for 1910

In November 1909 he was adopted Liberal candidate for the Marylebone East Division of London for the January 1910 General Election. This was a seat that had always voted in a Conservative since it was created in 1885. He was Liberal candidate again for Marylebone East at the December 1910 General Election. He did not contest the 1918 General Election. He was Liberal candidate for the Wimbledon Division of Surrey at the 1922 General Election. This was another Unionist seat that they had won at every election since it was created in 1885. He did not contest the 1923 General Election. He was selected at the eleventh hour as Liberal candidate for the Oxford Division of Oxfordshire for the 1924 General Election. This seat was a better prospect for a Liberal as the party had won the seat in 1922 and 1923 before losing it in a by-election early in 1924 back to the Unionists. In a difficulty election campaign for the Liberal party, he was able to do little more than retain second place;

General Election 1924 Electorate 27,139
Party	Candidate	Votes	%	±%
Unionist	Robert Bourne	12,196	57.3	+9.5
Liberal	Robert Moon	6,836	32.1	−7.0
Labour	F Ludlow	2,260	10.6	−2.5
Majority		5,360	25.2	+16.5
Turnout			78.5	−1.8
Unionist hold		Swing	+8.2	

He was Liberal candidate again for Oxford at the 1929 General Election. With the Liberal party experiencing a mini-revival nationally he was unable to make this tell in Oxford and finished second again;

General Election 1929 Electorate 38,668
Party	Candidate	Votes	%	±%
Unionist	Robert Bourne	14,638	52.5	−4.8
Liberal	Robert Moon	8,581	30.7	−1.4
Labour	J L Etty	4,694	16.8	+6.2
Majority			21.8	−3.4
Turnout		6,057	72.2	−6.3
Unionist hold		Swing	-1.7	

He did not stand for parliament again.

== Family ==
Moon married in 1901 Ethel Rose Grant Waddington, daughter of Major-General Thomas Waddington. They had a son, Penderel Moon, and four daughters, including Noël Oakeshott.
