= Olive Gibbs =

British politician (1918–1995)

Olive Frances Gibbs, DL (née Cox; 17 February 1918 – 28 September 1995) was an English Labour politician and anti-nuclear weapons campaigner. She was twice the Lord Mayor of Oxford and was chair of the Campaign for Nuclear Disarmament.

== Early life and education ==
Blue plaque to Olive Gibbs on the Christ Church Old Buildings in Oxford

Gibbs was born as Olive Frances Cox on 17 February 1918 at the Christ Church Old Buildings, a tenement building in the St Thomas parish of West Oxford. Her father was letterpress printer Lazarus Cox and her mother was Mary Ann Cox.

Gibbs was educated at St Thomas’s School on Osney Lane, then won a scholarship to study at Oxford High School for Girls and Milham Ford School. At Milham Ford, Gibbs passed seven subjects and also set a school record for receiving 37 detentions.

After leaving school at 16, Gibbs worked as an au pair in Juan-les-Pins, France. The position had been arranged by her godmother, Mother Anna Verena, the Mother Superior of St Thomas’s Convent. She lived and worked there for 18 months and learnt to speak French fluently.

After returning to England, Gibbs hoped to become a journalist, but was rejected by the chief reporter of the Oxford Mail because she was a woman. She instead found work at the Oxford Central Library.

In 1936, she met Edmund Gibbs, son of a left-wing Oxford councillor. They married in 1940 and had two sons.

== Political career ==
Gibbs entered Oxfordshire politics in 1953 and became the second woman Lord Mayor of Oxford (the first was Florence Kathleen Lower). She served as Lord Mayor twice, in 1974–75 and 1981–82, stepping in the second time to replace a colleague who had died halfway through his term. She was also the first woman to chair Oxfordshire County Council. Her husband, Edmund (accountant and founder of an eponymous Oxfordshire firm) was also a councillor for some time. She was influential in campaigning for the 1950s demolition of the infamous and spiked Cutteslowe Walls, which divided an Oxford council estate from nearby private housing, and played a large role in saving the working class community of Jericho from being knocked down and replaced with offices in the 1960s.

Gibbs was a founding member of the Campaign for Nuclear Disarmament (CND). She chaired the organisation between 1964 and 1967, as the CND's first female chair. For her work with the CND she was awarded the Frank Cousins’ Peace Award in 1986.

Gibbs was made an Honorary Freeman both of the City of Oxford and of the City of London. She was awarded Oxford Brookes University's first-ever honorary degree in 1986 and was a Deputy Lieutenant of Oxfordshire.

Gibbs released an autobiography titled Our Olive: The Autobiography of Olive Gibbs in 1989.

== Death and legacy ==
Gibbs Crescent is named after Olive

Gibbs died on 28 September 1995, aged 77.

Gibbs Crescent, a new street of social housing, was named after her, as was the Humanities building at Oxford Brookes University (then Oxford Polytechnic).

A blue plaque to Olive Gibbs was unveiled on her childhood home at Christ Church Old Buildings, St Thomas's, Oxford on 11 April 2015.

In November 2021, a photography exhibition about Gibbs was held at Weston Library.

In 2023, Oxford Town Hall increased the number of portraits of women on display, as only 5 out of the 45 portraits had previously featured women. Gibbs was among the eight new portraits of female politicians connected to Oxford that were added to the collection, alongside Lubna Arshad, Anneliese Dodds, Sophia Merivale, Layla Moran, Frances O'Grady, Icolyn "Ma" Smith, and Lily Tawney. Another oil portrait of Gibbs by P. G. Rose is held by Oxford Brookes University, and reproduced in the Art UK catalogue.

In November 2024, Christopher Baines and Helen Sheppard produced the documentary Olive Gibbs: A Remarkable Woman about her life.

== See also ==
- List of peace activists

== Sources ==
- Our Olive: The Autobiography of Olive Gibbs, Robert Dugdale, 1989 - ISBN 0-946976-02-3
- Liz Woolley (28 February 2018). "Series 2, Episode 3". Women in Oxford's History (Podcast).

Preceded by Canon John Collins	Chair of CND; 1964–1967	Succeeded by Sheila Oakes
