= Noël Oakeshott =

British art historian and archaeologist

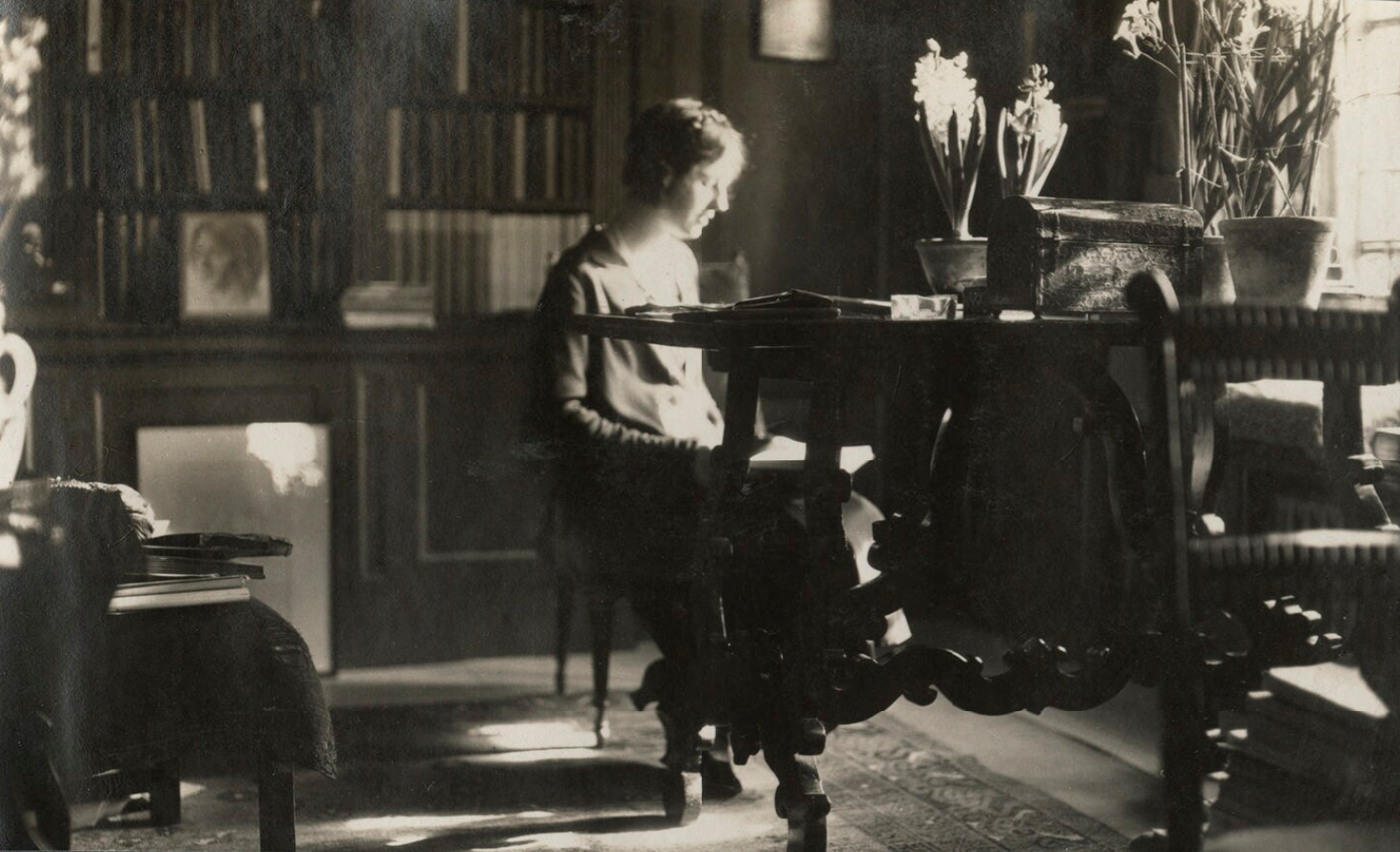
Noël Moon, c.1924

Noël Rose Oakeshott (née Moon; 29 December 1903 – 19 June 1976) was a British classical archaeologist.

== Life ==
Oakeshott was born at 58 Green Street, Mayfair, London, the daughter of the physician Robert Oswald Moon and his wife, Ethel Waddington (died 1933), daughter of Major-General Thomas Waddington of Pangbourne. She was the elder sister of historian Sir Penderel Moon, and had three younger sisters, Constance Mary, Margaret Willoughby, and Emilie De Rontenay. Her mother was a suffragist and artist.

Oakeshott was a pupil at the Farmhouse School, Mayortorne Manor near Wendover, run by Isabel Fry; her mother had known Constance Masefield (née Crommelin), Fry's friend, during the 1890s. There she learned Latin, and was taught Greek individually at her father's request. She acted there in a production of Iphigenia in Tauris, in Gilbert Murray's translation. She entered the University of Oxford as a non-college student, lodging with David George Hogarth. Following the Literae humaniores course from 1922, she completed "Mods". She was then advised to transfer to the Diploma in Classical Archaeology. In this early period at Oxford, Richard Hughes wooed her by letter.

Socially, Oakeshott met at this time classical scholars including Cyril Bailey. She fell in with Balliol College students, through Hugh Keen, father of Maurice Keen. In 1926 she acted the role of Leader of the chorus in a Balliol production of Hippolytus. The title role was played by Walter Oakeshott, who proposed marriage to her at the end of the year.

In 1926, also, Noël was the top student in the Diploma in Classical Archaeology, and was awarded the Gilchrist Scholarship to the British School at Rome. She was there for four months from January 1927. With the support of John Beazley she worked on Greek vases from southern Italy.

== Works and influence ==
Noël Oakeshott's essay Some Early South Italian Vase-Painters from 1929 remains a basic contribution in the field. The pioneering work of Beazley and Oakeshott was followed up by Arthur Dale Trendall. Oakeshott used Beazley's method of separation of individual painters, on examples of Italian vase painting. It was an application of connoisseurship, and some attributions have been reconsidered since.

In the 1930s she did work for Trendall's Paestan Pottery (1936), and visited the British School at Rome again in 1937, spending some time with Trendall and seeing museum collections in southern Italy. In the 1940s and 50s, following Trendall's appointment as Honorary Curator of the Nicholson Museum at the University of Sydney, Oakeshott acted as a buyer for museum, securing significant examples of Greek and Italian ceramics for the growing collection.

== Family ==
Oakeshott married the educational administrator and historian Walter Oakeshott in April 1928 at Aston Tirrold. The engagement from 1926 was prolonged by Walter's need to move from his teaching post at Bec School; an operation for chronic appendicitis he had; and opposition and stalling tactics from her wealthy father, who considered that Walter's social position was inadequate. Much later, Beazley named the so-called Oakeshott Painter of vases after the couple.

They had twin sons born in 1933, Evelyn and Robert, and daughters Helena (born 1931) and Rose (born 1940).

She died in Oxford in 1976, aged 72.
