= Arthur Annesley, 11th Viscount Valentia =

British politician

The Right Honourable The Viscount Valentia KCVO CB JP
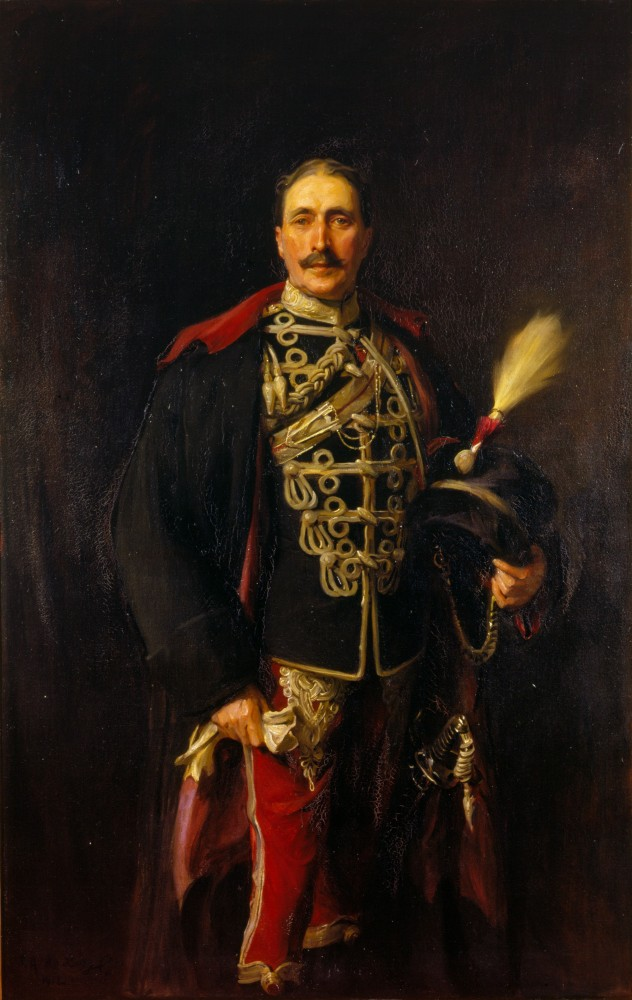
- Portrait by Philip de László, 1912

Comptroller of the Household
- In office 19 October 1898 – 4 December 1905
- Monarchs: Queen Victoria; Edward VII
- Prime Minister: The Marquess of Salisbury; Arthur Balfour
- Preceded by: Lord Arthur Hill
- Succeeded by: The Master of Elibank

Personal details
- Born: 23 August 1843 Scotland
- Died: 20 January 1927 (aged 83)
- Party: Conservative
- Spouse(s): Laura Sarah Webb (died 1933); 8 children
- Education: Royal Military Academy, Woolwich

Arthur Annesley, 11th Viscount Valentia, KCVO, CB, JP (23 August 1843 – 20 January 1927) was a British soldier, courtier and Conservative Party politician. He notably served as Comptroller of the Household between 1898 and 1905.

== Background and education ==
Annesley was the eldest son of the Honourable Arthur Annesley by his wife Flora Mary Macdonald, daughter of Lt. Colonel James Macdonald of Clanranald. His father died when he was one year old and he succeeded his grandfather in the viscountcy in 1863. He was educated at the Royal Military Academy, Woolwich.

== Military career ==
Annesley joined the 10th Hussars in 1864 and was promoted to lieutenant in 1868. He retired from the Army in 1872, but in 1894 was appointed Lieutenant colonel of the Queen's Own Oxfordshire Hussars. In early 1900, Lord Valentia was seconded for service with the Imperial Yeomanry in the Second Boer War, and left for South Africa in the SS Scot in late January. He served as Assistant Adjutant-General for Imperial Yeomanry, with the temporary rank of colonel, and was mentioned in despatches and appointed a Companion of the Order of the Bath (CB) in November 1900 for his services. Upon relinquishing his commission, he was granted, on 1 January 1901, the honorary rank of Colonel in the Army.

== Political career ==
He was appointed High Sheriff of Oxfordshire for 1874–75. The viscountcy of Valentia was an Irish peerage and did not entitle Annesley to an automatic seat in the House of Lords. He was instead elected as the Member of Parliament (MP) for Oxford in 1895, a seat he held until 1917.

He served as Comptroller of the Household under Lord Salisbury from 1898 to 1902 and under Arthur Balfour from 1902 to 1905. He was appointed a Member of the Royal Victorian Order (MVO) in July 1901, and a Companion of the Order of the Bath (CB) in September 1901. When the coalition government was formed in 1915, Lord Valentia was appointed a Lord in Waiting, a post he held until 1924.

In 1917 he was created Baron Annesley of Bletchington, in the County of Oxford, in the Peerage of the United Kingdom, which entitled him to a seat in the House of Lords. He was made a Knight Commander of the Royal Victorian Order (KCVO) in the 1923 Birthday Honours.

== Family ==
Lord Valentia married, on 30 January 1878, Laura Sarah Webb, daughter of Daniel Hale Webb, of Wykeham Park, Oxfordshire, and widow of Sir Algernon William Peyton, 4th Baronet. They had two sons and six daughters:

- Hon. Vere (8 March 1879 – 18 May 1975); married Rev. Guy Ronald Campbell, grandson of John Campbell, 2nd Earl Cawdor.
- Lt. Hon. Arthur (24 August 1880 – 16 November 1914); unmarried. Killed in action in France.
- Hon. Violet Katherine (18 March 1882 – 4 September 1963); married Maj. Charles Henry Gore, son of Sir Francis Charles Gore. They had a son, and two daughters.
- Caryl Arthur, 12th Viscount Valentia (3 July 1883 – 6 October 1949); unmarried.
- Hon. Helen (30 July 1884 – 21 July 1965); married Col. John Pemberton Heywood-Lonsdale. No known issue.
- Hon. Lettice (24 Sep 1885–1988); married Capt. Geoffrey Vaux Salvin Bowlby, maternal grandson of Sir David Hunter-Blair, 3rd Baronet.
- Hon. Hilda Cecil (19 April 1889 – 20 September 1972); unmarried.
- Hon. Dorothy (b. 11 May 1892); married Joseph Francis Vaughan Gibbs, maternal descendant of Sir Charles Mordaunt, 6th Baronet and Sir Philip Musgrave, 6th Baronet. They had two daughters.

== Death ==
Lord Valentia died in January 1927, aged 83, and was succeeded by his younger son, the Hon. Caryl Arthur James Annesley, as Lord Valentia's elder son, the Hon. Arthur Annesley, was killed in action in 1914.

== Polo ==
He was the Chairman of the Hurlingham Club Committee and the National Polo Pony Society.

Parliament of the United Kingdom
Preceded by George Tomkyns Chesney	Member of Parliament for Oxford; 1895–1917	Succeeded by John Marriott
Political offices
Preceded by Lord Arthur Hill	Comptroller of the Household; 1898–1905	Succeeded by The Master of Elibank
Peerage of Ireland
Preceded by Arthur Annesley	Viscount Valentia; 1863–1927	Succeeded by Caryl Annesley
Peerage of the United Kingdom
New creation	Baron Annesley of Bletchington; 1917–1927	Succeeded by Caryl Annesley
