= Edmund Kenyan =

Member of the Parliament of England

Edmund Kenyan (died 1414), of Oxford, was an English politician and innkeeper.

== Family ==
At some point between 137 1380, Kenyan married Elizabeth, the widow of John Norton of Oxford. Kenyan and Elizabeth had one daughter. At some point before 1411, he married a woman named Margaret. Nothing more is recorded of her and they appear not to have had children.

== Career ==
He was a Member (MP) of the Parliament of England for Oxford in 1379, November 1380, 1381, May 1382, 1385, 1386, November 1390, 1391 and 1394. He was Mayor of Oxford in 1401–2, 1404–5, 1410–11 and 1412–13.
