= John Quarame =

English politician (fl. 1419–1435)

John Quarame (fl. 1419–1435) was an English politician. He sat as MP for Oxford in December 1421.

He served as bailiff of Oxford during Michaelmas 1419 until 1420, 1425 until 1426 and 1434 until 1435. He served as surveyor of nuisances from 1426 until 1427.

He attended the borough elections to the Parliaments of 1419, 1420, 1423, 1426, 1429, 1431, 1432, 1433, 1437 and 1442, twice in his capacity as bailiff.

He acted as executor for John Noble in 1419 and John Ledbury in 1432. In 1429, he served briefly as a trustee of property belonging to William Offord, who had served alongside him in the House of Commons.
