= John Shawe (died 1431) =

English politician

John Shawe (born 1401–1431), also referred as John Shawe II, of Oxford, was an English politician. He was a Member of the Parliament of England (MP) for Oxford in April 1414.
