= 1917 Oxford by-election =

UK Parliamentary by-election

The 1917 Oxford by-election was held on 30 March 1917. The by-election was held due to the elevation to a UK peerage of the incumbent Conservative MP, Lord Valentia, who became Baron Annesley of Bletchington. It was won by the Conservative candidate John Marriott who was unopposed due to a War-time electoral pact.
