= John Hickes (politician) =

Member of the Parliament of England

John Hickes (fl. 1380–1388), of Oxford, was an English politician and spicer.

He was a Member (MP) of the Parliament of England for Oxford in January 1380, October 1383, April 1384, November 1384 and February 1388.
