= Thomas Houkyn =

English Member of Parliament and county coroner

Thomas Houkyn or Howkyn (died 1407, of Oxford), was an English Member of Parliament (MP) and county coroner.

He was a Member of the Parliament of England for Oxford in 1386.
