= John Ottworth =

English politician (died 1419)

John Ottworth (died 1419) was an English politician. He sat as MP for Oxford in 1391, September 1397 and 1406.

He also served as bailiff of Oxford from Michaelmas 1394 till 1395, as surveyor of nuisances from 1410 till 1412 and 1414 till 1415, as coroner before 1418 and as tax collector of Oxford in June 1410 and October 1412.

Ottworth was buried in April 1419.
