= 1873 Oxford by-election =

UK Parliamentary by-election

The 1873 Oxford by-election was held on 6 December 1873. The by-election was held due to William Vernon Harcourt, the incumbent Liberal MP, becoming the Solicitor General for England and Wales. It was retained by Harcourt, who was unopposed.
