= Richard Croke (MP) =

English lawyer and politician

Richard Croke (1625 – 14 September 1683) was an English lawyer and politician who sat in the House of Commons in 1654.

Croke was the son of Unton Croke of Marston, Oxfordshire and his wife Anne Hore, daughter of Richard Hore of Marston. He was educated at Winchester College in 1636, aged 11 and entered Inner Temple in 1636. He was called to the Bar in 1646. He was a commissioner for the sale of Woodstock manor in 1649. In 1653 he became deputy recorder of Oxford and became freeman of the city of Oxford.

In 1654, Croke became Member of Parliament for Oxford in the First Protectorate Parliament after the elected member chose to sit for another constituency. He was J.P. for Oxford from 1655 to August 1660, and JP for Abingdon in 1655. He was commissioner for security for Oxfordshire from 1655 to 1656 and was a JP for Woodstock from 1656 to August 1660. In 1656 he was elected MP for Oxford in the Second Protectorate Parliament. He was commissioner for assessment for Oxfordshire in 1657. In 1659, he was re-elected MP for Oxford in the Third Protectorate Parliament. He was commissioner for militia for Oxfordshire in 1659. He was commissioner for assessment for Oxfordshire in January 1660, commissioner for militia for Oxford in March 1660 and JP for Oxfordshire from March 1660 until his death.

Croke stood unsuccessfully for parliament in the general election of 1660. He became Recorder of Oxford in June 1660 and remained until his death. In 1661 he was elected MP for Oxford again in the Cavalier Parliament. He was commissioner for assessment for Oxfordshire from 1661 to 1663 and commissioner for assessment for Oxford from 1661 to 1680. In 1662 he was bencher of his Inn. He was commissioner for assessment for Oxfordshire from 1664 to 1680, and became JP for Oxford again in 1665 until his death. He was reader of his Inn in 1670. In 1671 he succeeded his father in the estates at Marston. He was commissioner for recusants for Oxfordshire in 1675 and also became Serjeant-at-law in 1675 until his death. He was knighted on 16 March 1681 after drafting the address approving of the dissolution of Parliament.

Croke died at the age of 57 and was buried at Marston.

Croke married by 1654, Elizabeth Wright daughter of Martin Wright, goldsmith of Oxford and had five sons.

Parliament of England
Preceded by Bulstrode Whitelocke	Member of Parliament for Oxford; 1654–1659; With: Unton Croke 1659	Succeeded by Not represented in Restored Rump
