= John Marriott (British politician) =

British politician (1859–1945)

Sir John Marriott
- Marriott in 1917

Member of Parliament for York
- In office 6 December 1923 – 10 May 1929
- Preceded by: John Butcher
- Succeeded by: Frederick George Burgess

Personal details
- Born: John Arthur Ransome Marriott; 17 August 1859; Bowdon, Cheshire, England
- Died: 6 June 1945 (aged 85); Llandrindod Wells, Radnorshire, Wales
- Political party: Conservative
- Spouse: Henrietta Robinson (m. 1891)
- Children: 1
- Education: Repton School
- Alma mater: New College, Oxford
- Occupation: Educationist; historian; MP

Sir John Arthur Ransome Marriott (17 August 1859 – 6 June 1945) was a British educationist, historian, and Conservative member of parliament (MP).

Marriott taught modern history at the University of Oxford from 1884 to 1920. He was an Honorary fellow, formerly fellow, lecturer and tutor in modern History, of Worcester College, Oxford. He was the Conservative MP for Oxford from 1917 to 1922, and for York from 1923 to 1929. After defeat in 1929, he retired from active politics.

During the course of his lifetime, Marriott wrote more than forty books on British and European history, as well as current political subjects. He was knighted in 1924.

== Early life ==
He was born in Bowdon, Cheshire, the son of Francis Marriott, a solicitor from a family of small landowners, and his wife Elizabeth Ransome, daughter of the surgeon Joseph Atkinson Ransome. He was educated at Repton School and New College, Oxford, graduating in 1882 with a Second in Modern History. As an undergraduate, he was an active member of the Canning Club, a Conservative society.

== Educationist and historian ==
In 1883, Marriott became a lecturer in Modern History at New College, and soon after at Worcester College, of which he became a Fellow in 1914.

In 1886, he was recruited by M. E. Sadler as an Oxford University extension lecturer, to give lectures in towns across the country. He was a "natural platform orator... notable for characteristic gestures and the full sweep of his gown". In 1895, he became secretary of the Extension delegacy, which he remained until 1920.

Marriott wrote prolifically, on modern English and European history, the British Empire, and on political institutions. His books, aimed at a non-specialist audience, benefitted from his experience as an extension lecturer.

== Politician ==
Marriott had been politically active as an undergraduate, and in 1885 was adopted as the Conservative candidate for East St Pancras, although he later withdrew. In 1886, he was selected for Rochdale but lost in the general election to the defending Liberal, Thomas Bayley Potter. He applied for selection as Conservative candidate for the Oxford University by-election in 1914, but was not successful.

In 1917, he was elected unopposed under the war-time electoral pact to represent Oxford City in the by-election following the elevation to a UK peerage of Lord Valentia. Re-elected in 1918 (in the so-called Coupon Election), he lost his seat in the general election of 1922 to Frank Gray, the Liberal.

Marriott returned to parliament in 1923 for York, defending his seat successfully in the 1924 general election, but lost in 1929 to a Labour candidate, Frederick George Burgess.

== Personal life ==
In 1891, Marriott married Henrietta Robinson, daughter of William Percy Robinson, warden of Trinity College, Glenalmond, and they had one daughter, Cicely, in 1892.

He died in Llandrindod Wells on 6 June 1945.

== Works ==
- George Canning and his Times: A Political Study, John Murray, 1903.
- The Life and Times of Lucius Cary, Viscount Falkland, G. P. Putnam's Sons, 1907.
- The Remaking of Modern Europe from the Outbreak of the French Revolution to the Treaty of Berlin, 1789-1878, Methuen & Co., 1910 [1st Pub. 1909].
- Second Chambers: an Inductive Study in Political Science, Oxford: The Clarendon Press, 1910.
- English Political Institutions; an Introductory Study, Oxford : The Clarendon Press, 1913.
- The French Revolution of 1848 in its Economic Aspect, 2 Vol., Oxford: The Clarendon Press, 1913.
- England Since Waterloo, G. P. Putnam's Sons, 1916 [1st Pub. 1913].
- The Eastern Question: An Historical Study Study in European Diplomacy. Oxford: At the Clarendon Press. 1917 – via Internet Archive.
- English History in Shakspeare, E.P. Dutton Company, 1918.
- Europe and Beyond, E. P. Dutton & Company, 1921; Europe and beyond: a preliminary survey of world-politics 1870-1939 (1951)
- Economics and Ethics: A Treatise on Wealth and Life, Methuen & Co., 1923.
- Makers of Modern Italy: Napoleon-Mussolini, Oxford: The Clarendon Press, 1931.
- The English in India: A Problem of Politics, 1932.
- Queen Victoria and her ministers (1933)
- The life of John Colet (1933)
- Oxford: its place in national history (1933)
- Modern England (1934) 4th ed 1948 published as Modern England: 1885-1945: A history of my own times
- Castlereagh, 1936.
- Commonwealth or Anarchy?: A Survey of Projects of Peace, from the Sixteenth to the Twentieth Century, Oxford University Press, 1939 [1st Pub. 1937].
- English History in English Fiction, Blackie & Son, 1940.
- The Tragedy of Europe, Blackie & Son, 1941.
- Anglo-Russian Relations, 1689-1943, Methuen & Co., 1944.
- Memories of Four Score Years: The Autobiography of the Late Sir John Marriott, Blackie & Son Limited, 1946.
- A history of Europe from 1815 to 1939 (1948)
- The Evolution of Prussia The Making of an Empire Oxford University Press, 1915. Joint authorship with Sir Charles Grant Robertson

=== Articles ===
- "The 'Right to Work'," The Nineteenth Century and After, Vol. LXIII, January/June 1908.
- "Democracy, Diplomacy and War," The Edinburgh Review, Vol. CCXXII, N°. 454, October 1915.
- "The Hellenic Factor in the Problem of the Near East," The Edinburgh Review, Vol. CCXXIII, N°. 445, January, 1916.
- "The Foreign Policy of the United States," The Edinburgh Review, Vol. CCXXIX, N°. 468, April 1919.
- "Swiss Democracy," The Edinburgh Review, Vol. CCXXXII, N°. 474, October 1920.
- "The Party System and Parliamentary Government," The Edinburgh Review, Vol. CCXXXIV, N°. 478, October 1921.
- "Under-Garrisoned Dominions," The Living Age, December 1937.

== See also ==
- Charles Oman

Parliament of the United Kingdom
Preceded by The Viscount Valentia	Member of Parliament for Oxford; 1917–1922	Succeeded by Frank Gray
Preceded by John Butcher	Member of Parliament for the City of York; 1923–1929	Succeeded by Frederick George Burgess
