= Walter Benham =

English politician

Walter Benham (fl. 1380–1415) was an English politician. He sat as MP for Oxford in January 1397, and 1402.

He also served as bailiff of Oxford from Michaelmas 1393 till 1394, and tax collector of Oxford in December 1414, and November 1415.

Before 1380, he married Emma.
