= Hugh Benet =

English politician

Hugh Benet (died 1446) was an English politician. He sat as MP for Oxford in 1407, 1410, May 1413, and 1417.

He also served as chamberlain of Oxford from Michaelmas 1397 till 1398 and tax collector in Oxfordshire in September 1431.

Before 1414, he married a woman called Joan.
