= Ivor Davies (politician) =

British politician (1915–1986)

Davies in 1955

Ivor Roland Morgan Davies CBE (12 August 1915 – November/December 1986) was a British Liberal Party politician, journalist and United Nations Association administrator. Politically, his chief claim to fame was his decision in October 1938 to withdraw as Liberal candidate at the Oxford by-election along with the Labour candidate Patrick Gordon-Walker to allow an independent, Popular Front, anti-Munich candidate, A. D. Lindsay, the Master of Balliol, to challenge the government candidate Quintin Hogg.

== Background ==
He was born at Pontrhydygroes, Cardiganshire, in August 1915, the son of an Edinburgh Congregationalist minister. He was educated at George Watson's College, Edinburgh and graduated with honours in history at Edinburgh University.

== Politics ==
While at Edinburgh University, he was President of the Liberal Club and editor of their magazine. He was Chairman of the University Liberal Club from 1935 to 1938. He was President of the Union of University Liberal Societies from 1937 to 1938. He wrote on political and social questions. In 1938 when Jo Grimond resigned as Liberal prospective parliamentary candidate for Aberdeenshire Central, Davies was selected to replace him for a general election expected to take place in 1939. However, in 1938 when a parliamentary vacancy opened at Oxford, and the incumbent Liberal prospective parliamentary candidate withdrew, Davies was selected by Oxford Liberals to contest the 1938 Oxford by-election. His only real connection with Oxford was that he had presided at a Liberal students' conference there earlier that year. Davies started his campaign but knew that the Conservative candidate would certainly hold the seat if the anti-government vote was split between himself and the Labour candidate. He offered to withdraw if the Labour candidate also withdrew in order for the two parties to support a joint candidate. This duly happened, but the Conservative still retained the seat against the political climate of Neville Chamberlain and his visit to Munich to meet Adolf Hitler. Davies resumed his role as prospective candidate for Aberdeenshire Central and eventually had the chance of contesting the seat at the 1945 General Election, but came third;

General Election 1945: Aberdeenshire Central Electorate 43,772
Party	Candidate	Votes	%	±%
Unionist	Henry Reginald Spence	15,702	52.3	
Labour	D.S. Hay	7,997	26.6	
Liberal	Ivor Roland Morgan Davies	6,348	21.1	
Majority				
Turnout			68.6	
Unionist hold		Swing		

In 1950 he had published Trial By Ballot, a book giving his insights into the British electoral and political scene from 1918 to 1950. Following boundary changes, he was Liberal candidate for the re-drawn Aberdeenshire West at the 1950 General Election. The new seat included part of the old Aberdeenshire Central seat where he stood in 1945. Despite this familiarity, he again came third;

General Election 1950: West Aberdeenshire Electorate 39,077
Party	Candidate	Votes	%	±%
Unionist	Henry Reginald Spence	17,550	55.6	
Labour	Thomas Oswald	7,298	23.1	
Liberal	Ivor Roland Morgan Davies	6,740	21.3	
Majority		10,252	32.5	
Turnout			80.8	
Unionist hold		Swing		

He was a member of the national executive committee of the United Nations Association. He did not contest the 1951 General Election. For the 1955 General Election, he was Liberal candidate for Oxford, where 17 years earlier he had briefly been candidate. He again finished third. At the 1959 General election he was again the Liberal candidate for Oxford, finishing third. In 1962 he was elected a member of Oxford City Council. At the 1964 General Election he fought Oxford for the third and final time, finishing third. He was always on the radical wing of the party and was in particular a supporter of nuclear disarmament being one time chair of Oxford CND. He was appointed a CBE for political and public service in 1984.

== War service and family ==
During the war, Davies enlisted in the Royal Air Force and rose to Acting Flight Lieutenant, serving at home, in India and Burma where he was wounded. In 1940 he married Jean McLeod whom he had known from Edinburgh. They had two sons, Michael and John, who became a Labour Party politician, standing against Margaret Thatcher in Finchley in 1987 and a daughter Mary who like her father was president of the Edinburgh University Liberal Club and was an elected Liberal councillor in Havering.

== Business ==
He worked as a journalist on the News Chronicle. He was a Director of a London publishing firm, and a Director of book distribution companies.
