= 1924 Oxford by-election =

UK parliamentary by-election

The 1924 Oxford by-election was a parliamentary by-election held on 5 June 1924 for the British House of Commons constituency of Oxford.

== Vacancy ==
The seat had become vacant when the Liberal Member of Parliament (MP) Frank Gray was unseated on petition on 14 May, after his agent had falsified the account for his expenses at the 1923 election. Gray had held the seat since the 1922 election.

== Electoral history ==
The result of the last General Election;

Gray

1923 general election: Oxford
Party	Candidate	Votes	%	±%
Liberal	Frank Gray	12,311	56.1	−2.9
Conservative	Robert Bourne	9,618	43.9	+2.9
Majority		2,693	12.2	−5.8
Turnout		21,929	83.5	−0.3
Liberal hold		Swing	-2.9	

== Candidates ==
Fry

- On 16 May, the Oxford Liberal Association immediately invited the 52-year-old C.B. Fry, to defend the seat. He had been an all-round sportsman who was best known as an England cricketer. Fry had contested Brighton in the 1922 election and the neighbouring seat of Banbury in the 1923 election.
- The Conservative Party selected the 35-year-old Robert Bourne, who had been a member of the New College boat which won silver in the men’s eights at the 1912 Olympics.
- The Labour Party who had not fielded a candidate before, selected the 26-year-old Kenneth Lindsay, recently down from Worcester and contesting his first Parliamentary election. He had been President of the Oxford Union in Michaelmas 1922.

== Campaign ==
All three candidates were former Oxford Blues enabling the popular press to dub the campaign 'The Battle of the Blues'.

Former Liberal MP Frank Gray, despite being barred from standing, was still very popular in the constituency and he was active in support of Fry throughout the campaign. During the campaign Fry advocated the introduction of equal opportunities for women, the imposition of responsibilities on the fathers of illegitimate children and the introduction of a tax system that would give privacy and independence to married women.

== Result ==
The result was a gain for the Conservatives.

1924 Oxford by-election
Party	Candidate	Votes	%	±%
Conservative	Robert Bourne	10,079	47.8	+3.9
Liberal	C.B. Fry	8,237	39.1	−17.0
Labour	Kenneth Lindsay	2,769	13.1	New
Majority		1,842	8.7	N/A
Turnout		21,085	80.3	−3.2
Conservative gain from Liberal		Swing	+10.5	

== Aftermath ==
Bourne would hold the seat at the following General Election later in the year.
