= William Foster MacNeece Foster =

Royal Air Force air vice marshal (1889–1978)

- Born: William Foster MacNeece; 21 August 1889; Aldershot, Surrey
- Died: 28 March 1978 (aged 88); Oxford, Oxfordshire
- Military career
- Allegiance: United Kingdom
- Branch: British Army (1909–1918); Royal Air Force (1918–1945)
- Service years: 1909–1937; 1939–1945
- Rank: Air Vice Marshal
- Commands: No. 6 (Bomber) Group (1939–1942); No. 1 Air Defence Group (1929–1934); 2nd Balloon Wing (1916–1919)
- Conflicts: First World War; Second World War
- Awards: Companion of the Order of the Bath; Commander of the Order of the British Empire; Distinguished Service Order; Distinguished Flying Cross; Mentioned in Despatches; Commander of the Legion of Merit (United States); Order of the Cloud and Banner with Special Cravat (China)

Air Vice Marshal William Foster MacNeece Foster, CB, CBE, DSO, DFC (21 August 1889 – 28 March 1978) was a senior Royal Air Force officer who was a member of the Combined Chiefs of Staff from 1942 to 1943. He later became a member of Oxford City Council and Lord Mayor of Oxford.

== Early life ==
Born William Foster MacNeece on 21 August 1889 in Aldershot, Surrey, England, he was the eldest son of Colonel T. F. MacNeece RAMC. He was educated at Cheltenham College, a private school located in Cheltenham, Gloucestershire, England. He later assumed the surname of Foster by way of royal licence in 1927.

== Military career ==
Having attended the Royal Military College, Sandhurst, Foster was commissioned on 6 February 1909 into the Queen's Own Royal West Kent Regiment as a second lieutenant. He was promoted to lieutenant on 2 February 1912. Having trained as a pilot, on 31 October 1913, he was awarded Royal Aero Club (RAeC) Aviator Certificate number 671. On 28 April 1914, he was transferred to the reserve of the Royal Flying Corps.

With the outbreak of the First World War, Foster would go on to serve in Europe. In 1914, he was a pilot in No. 3 Squadron RFC, conducting air reconnaissance over France. He was a captain when, on 9 September 1915, he was appointed a flight commander in the Royal Flying Corps. On 5 December 1916, as a temporary major, he was appointed wing commander and made a temporary lieutenant colonel. Foster was awarded the Distinguished Service Order (DSO) in the 1917 New Year Honours.

On 16 January 1919, he joined the Air Ministry as a Staff Officer, 1st Class. Foster became Air Officer Commanding No. 1 Air Defence Group RAF in 1929 and Air Officer Commanding No. 6 (Bomber) Group RAF in 1939. He served in the Second World War in this role before becoming a member of the Combined Chiefs of Staff in 1942, Head of Inter-Service Liaison Committee in Washington D. C. in 1943 and Head of the RAF Training Mission in China in 1944.

== Later life ==
After the Second World War, Foster settled in Oxford. He served on the city council, and was Lord Mayor in 1966/7. He died on 28 March 1978.

== Personal life ==
Foster married Jean Bruce in 1928. Together they had two daughters.

Military offices
Preceded by Eugene Gerrard	Air Officer Commanding No. 1 Air Defence Group; 1929–1934	Succeeded by Jack Baldwin
