= John Shawe (died 1407) =

English politician

John Shawe (died 1407), of Oxford, was an English politician.

He was coroner of Oxford from 1386 to 1395, before November 1405 and at his death. He was made an alderman for 1391-95 and 1396–1406, Mayor of Oxford for 1395-96 and elected a Member of the Parliament of England (MP) for Oxford in September 1388.
