= John Smith (Cavalier, born 1608) =

English politician

John Smith (c. 1608 – 4 November 1657) was an English politician who sat in the House of Commons from 1640 to 1644. He supported the Royalist cause in the English Civil War.

Smith was the son of Oliver Smith, alderman and mayor of Oxford and his first wife Anne Bussey. He was baptised at St Aldate's Church on 23 February 1609. In September 1631 he was appointed junior bailiff. He was mayor of Oxford in 1639. In October 1640 he stood unsuccessfully for parliament at Oxford but in November 1640, he was elected as Member of Parliament for Oxford at a by-election for the Long Parliament. He entered Gray's Inn on 16 March 1641. On 15 August 1642 he contributed 6 pounds of powder and 2 yards of match for the King's cause and later attended the King's parliament at Oxford. He was accordingly disabled from sitting in parliament in 1644. In 1646 he compounded for delinquency and was fined £200. In 1648 parliament ordained that he lost his place on the Mayor's Council.

Smith died at the age of 49 and was buried at St Aldate's Church, Oxford.

Smith married Elizabeth Bosworth daughter of Henry Bosworth, brewer and former mayor, at St Aldate's Church on 14 October 1627.

Parliament of England
Preceded by Viscount Andover; John Whistler	Member of Parliament for Oxford; 1640–1644; With: John Whistler	Succeeded by John Nixon; John Doyley
