= Thomas Wentworth (Recorder of Oxford) =

English lawyer and politician

Thomas Wentworth (c. 1568 – by September 1627 (Note: The Oxford Dictionary of National Biography has a death year of 1628, based on his apparent return for parliament for Oxford that year. But the History of Parliament records this is the result of confusion with his son, also named Thomas Wentworth.)) was an English lawyer and politician who sat in the House of Commons between 1604 and 1626. He was a vocal if imprudent defender of the rights of the House of Commons.

Wentworth was the third son of Peter Wentworth of Lillingstone Lovell in Oxfordshire, a prominent Puritan leader in Parliament during the reign of Elizabeth I. He was educated at University College, Oxford and became a member of Lincoln's Inn where he was called to the bar in 1594.

Wentworth was elected member of parliament MP for Oxford in 1604. In Parliament he was an ardent and sometimes violent opponent of the Crown and of the abuse of royal prerogatives. He opposed the projected union of England and Scotland when it was discussed in 1607. He was appointed Recorder of Oxford in 1607 and held the post until 1623. He fell out with Oxford University, both for his activities in Parliament and his conduct as Recorder of Oxford, in particular his support for the city's desire to establish a police force to patrol the streets at night. This led to his being discommonsed (suspended from membership of the university) by the Vice-Chancellor in 1611 as a "malicious and implacable fomentor of troubles", although the authorities relented in 1614. He was appointed Lent Reader of his Inn in 1612.

In 1614 Wentworth was re-elected MP for Oxford and he spoke in Parliament against the imposition of illegal taxes, in which he argued that the Spanish loss of the Netherlands and the recent assassination of Henry IV of France were the "just reward" for such impositions; for this inflammatory speech he was imprisoned after the dissolution of Parliament, chiefly to appease the French ambassador.

Wentworth was re-elected MP for Oxford in 1621 and in that parliament he opposed the proposed marriage of the Prince of Wales to a Spanish princess, and when the King angrily wrote to the Speaker that the Commons should not interfere with such matters of state, he boldly stated that he "never yet read of anything that was not fit for the consideration of a parliament". In 1624 he was re-elected MP for Oxford and in that parliament he was a strong advocate of declaring war on Spain. He was re-elected MP for Oxford in 1625 and 1626. He was dead by September 1627, and was succeeded by his eldest son Thomas Wentworth, who sat for Oxford in 1628.

Wentworth married Dorothy Keble, daughter of Thomas Keble of Newbottle in Northamptonshire, and they had six sons and at least three daughters.

== Notes ==
Parliament of England
Preceded by Sir Francis Leigh; George Calfield	Member of Parliament for Oxford; 1604–1626; With: Sir Francis Leigh 1604–1611; Sir John Astley 1614; Sir John Brooke 1621–1622; John Whistler 1624–1626	Succeeded by John Whistler; Thomas Wentworth
