= Unton Croke =

English judge and politician

Unton Croke (1593 – 28 January 1671) was an English judge and politician who sat in the House of Commons in 1628 and 1640. He supported the Parliamentarian cause during the English Civil War.

Croke was the son of Sir John Croke of Chilton, Buckinghamshire, and Studley, Oxfordshire, who was a judge, recorder of London and Speaker of the House of Commons, and his wife Catherine, the daughter of Sir Michael Blount of Mapledurham House in Oxfordshire. He was 1st cousin to Sir James Whitelocke. He matriculated at Oxford University on 2 March 1610, and in 1616 he was called to the bar at Inner Temple.

In 1625, Croke was elected Member of Parliament for Wallingford for a year. Croke became a bencher of his Inn on 14 June 1635. He was re-elected for Wallingford in April 1640 for the Short Parliament.

Croke supported the Parliamentary side in the English Civil War although he was not a member of the Long Parliament. His house at Marston, Oxfordshire was used by Sir Thomas Fairfax as his headquarters when besieging Oxford in 1645 and 1646. It was also used for the negotiations for the royalist surrender, which was signed there. In 1649, Croke was created B.C.L. at Oxford. He went with Bulstrode Whitelocke to Sweden in 1654 and was created serjeant-at-law by Oliver Cromwell on 21 December 1654. John Owen, dean of Christ Church, recommended Croke for a judgeship in 1655 and he was made commissioner for trials of persons charged with treason in 1656. He was justice of the peace for Marston, Oxfordshire and for a time was deputy of the Earl of Pembroke in the stewardship of the Oxford University. He retired from public life after the Restoration.

Croke died at the age of 76 and was buried at the Church of St Nicholas, Marston.

Croke married Anne Hore, daughter and heiress of Richard Hore of Marston in Oxfordshire on 8 November 1617. They lived at Marston and had ten children including Sir Richard Croke who was later a member of parliament for Oxford. Another son was Unton Croke.

Parliament of England
Preceded by Sir Anthony Forrest; Michael Molyns	Member of Parliament for Wallingford; 1625–1626; With: Sir Anthony Forrest	Succeeded by Sir Robert Knollys; Edmund Dunch
Parliament suspended since 1629	Member of Parliament for Wallingford; 1640; With: Edmund Dunch	Succeeded by Edmund Dunch; Thomas Howard
