= Charles Neate =

English politician, economist and writer

Charles Neate (1806–1879) was an English politician and academic, economist and political writer.

== Life ==
He was the fifth of the eleven children of Thomas Neate, rector and squire of Alvescot, Oxfordshire, and his wife Catherine, born at Adstock, Buckinghamshire, on 18 June 1806. He was sent to the Collège Bourbon in Paris, where Sainte-Beuve was one of his school-fellows, and he won a prize for French composition for all the schools of France.

Neate matriculated as a commoner of Lincoln College, Oxford, on 2 June 1824, aged 17; he was scholar 1826–8, and graduated as a first-class man in 1828. The same year he was elected fellow of Oriel College. He was called to the bar at Lincoln's Inn in 1832, but a quarrel with Sir Richard Bethell terminated his career there. He acted as secretary to Sir Francis Thornhill Baring, when Baring was chancellor of the exchequer (1839–41).

In 1857 Neate was appointed Drummond professor of political economy at Oxford, for a five-year term. He was also examiner in the School of Law and History at Oxford in 1853–5, and was appointed lecturer on the same subjects at Oriel in 1856. He was also elected Liberal Member of Parliament for Oxford, but was, however, a few months later unseated for bribery. His second election was to the parliament which sat from 1863 to 1868; and then he did not seek re-election.

After 1868 Neate lived in Oxford. He died senior fellow of his college on 7 February 1879, and was buried at Adstock. He was considered fearlessly honest and outspoken, and one of his remembered sayings was "Wherever I look I see only brilliant political sunsets."

== Works ==
Neate's pamphlets dealt mainly with political questions, and included Considerations on the Punishment of Death against capital punishment. He produced economic pamphlets when he was Drummond professor. Others were:

- Game Laws (anon.), London, 1830.
- Arguments against Reform (anon.), London, 1831.
- Quarrel with Canada (anon.), London, 1838.
- Summary of Debates and Proceedings in Parliament relating to the Corn Laws, 1842.
- Dialogues des Morts; Guizot et Louis Blanc (anon.), Oxford, 1848; Paris, 1849.
- Remarks on a late Decision of the Judges as Visitors of the Inns of Court, 1848.
- Introduction au Manuel Descriptif de l'Université d'Oxford (anon.), Oxford, 1851.
- Observations on College Leases, Oxford, 1853.
- Remarks on the Legal and other Studies of the University, 1856.
- Answer to a recent Vote of Convocation, 1858.
- The proper Share of the University in the Board of Street Commissioners (no date, but after 1868).
- Two Lectures on the Currency, Oxford, 1859.
- Two Lectures on the History and Conditions of Landed Property, Oxford, 1860.
- Three Lectures on Taxation, especially that of Land, Oxford, 1861.
- Relations of Law and Equity as affected by Statute of Uses, 1801.
- Two Lectures on Trades Unions, Oxford, 1862.
- Somnium Ricardi, 1863.
- Law of Entail, London, 1865.
- Observations on the Reorganisation of our Courts of Justice, 1868.
- Specimens of Composition in Prose and Verse, Oxford, 1874.
- Oratio in Collegio Orielensi (anon.), Oxford, 1875.
- Besika Bay, a Dialogue, Oxford, 1877.
- Universities Reform Bill, Oxford, 1877. He had favoured university reform till it was taken up by the government, and then resented its being forced on the university, in his pamphlet entitled Objections to the Government Scheme for the present Subjection and future Management of the University of Oxford, 1854.

== Notes ==
Attribution

This article incorporates text from a publication now in the public domain: Lee, Sidney, ed. (1894). "Neate, Charles (1806-1879)". Dictionary of National Biography. Vol. 40. London: Smith, Elder & Co.
