= John Doyley =

John Doyley (1602–1660) was an English politician who sat in the House of Commons from 1646 to 1648.

== Background ==
Doyley was the son of Sir Cope Doyley of Chislehampton. He matriculated at Wadham College, Oxford on 27 November 1618 aged 16. He was Sheriff of Oxfordshire in 1638. In 1646, he was elected member of parliament for Oxford as a recruiter to the Long Parliament but was secluded under Pride's Purge in December 1648. He was a parliamentary commissioner for the visitation of the university.

Doyley married Mary Shirley, daughter of Sir John Shirley of Isfield Sussex. He was the father of Sir John D'Oyly, 1st Baronet, of Chislehampton.

=== Death ===
Doyley died at the age of about 58.

Parliament of England
Preceded by John Whistler; John Smith	Member of Parliament for Oxford; 1646–1648; With: John Nixon	Succeeded by Not represented in Rump Parliament
