= Gilbert Charles Bourne =

British zoologist

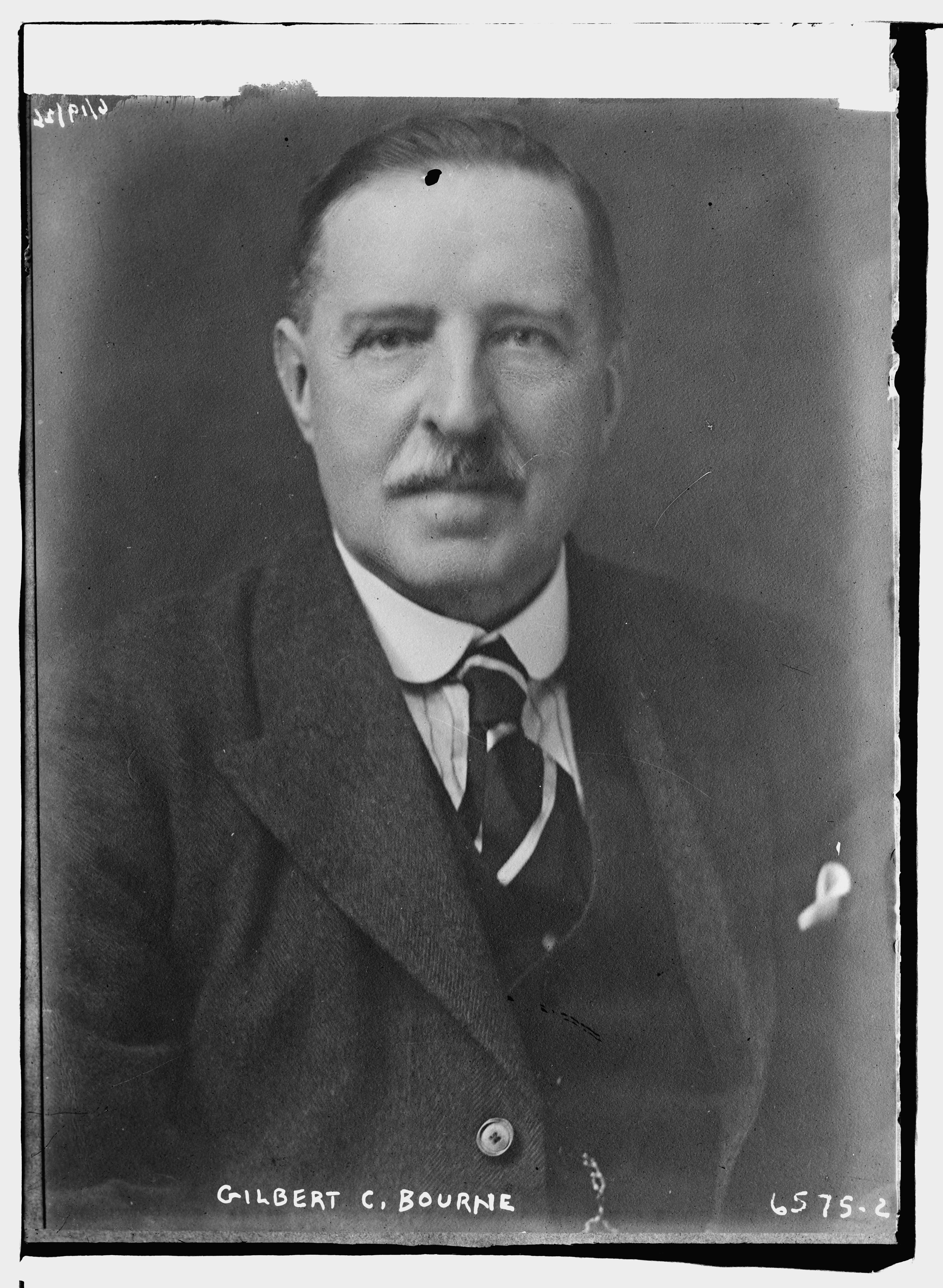
Gilbert C. Bourne

Gilbert Charles Bourne FRS (5 July 1861 – 9 March 1933) also known as 'Beja' Bourne, was a British zoologist.

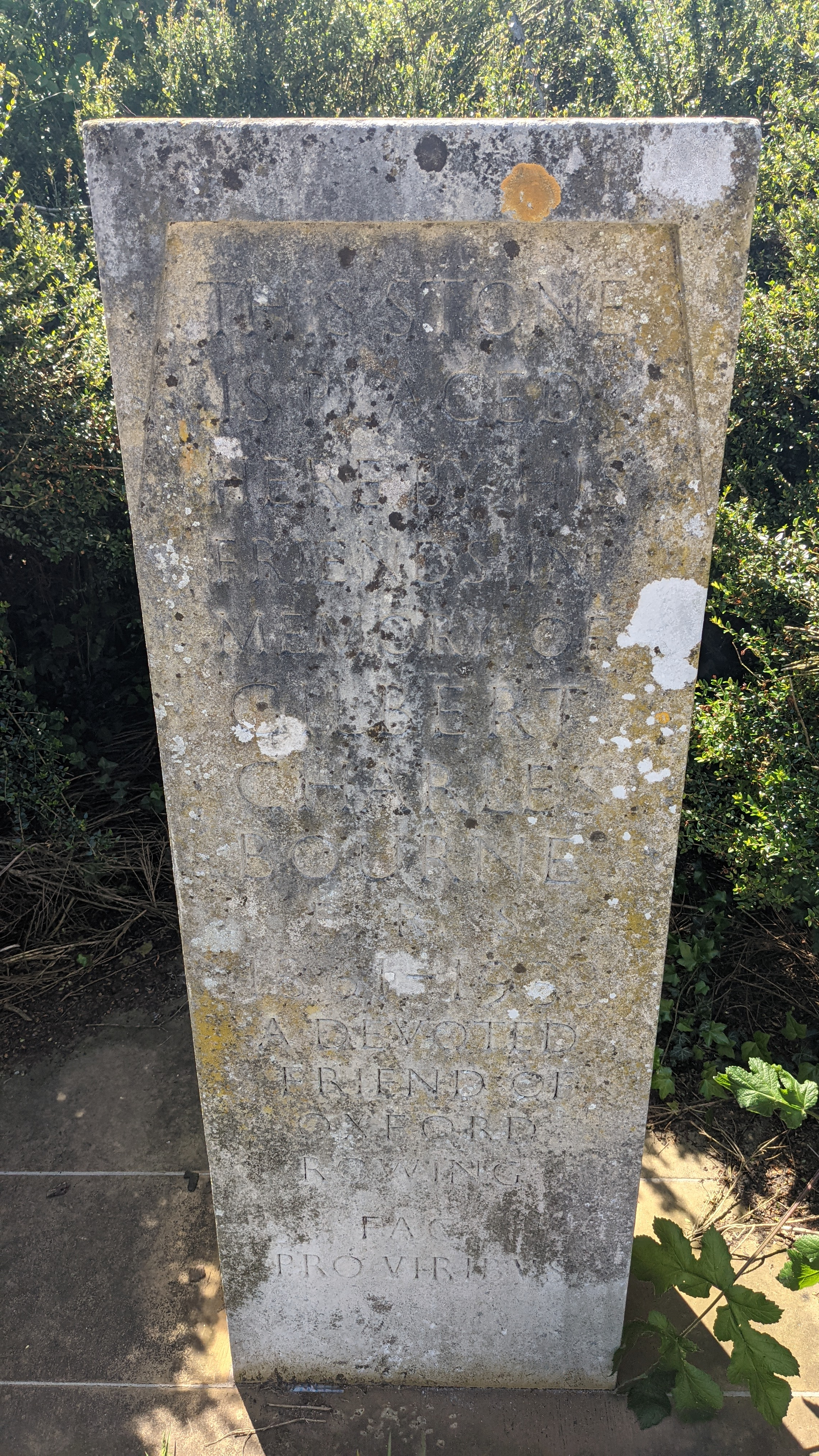
Memorial near Ifley lock, Oxford.

Bourne was admitted as an undergraduate of New College, Oxford, before becoming a Fellow of Merton College, Oxford and Linacre Professor of Comparative Anatomy at the University of Oxford from 1906 to 1921.

Whilst an undergraduate, Bourne rowed at bow in the winning Oxford crew in the 1882 Boat Race. He returned in the bow seat of the Oxford crew the following year, winning the 1883 Boat Race. His son, Robert Croft Bourne, also rowed for Oxford, stroking them to wins over Cambridge in the Boat Race in 1909, 1910, 1911, and 1912.

Bourne was a rowing coach and theorist. He designed racing boats, and modelled the gearing of oars. In 1925 he published "A Text-Book of Oarsmanship with an Essay on Muscular Action in Rowing", which was an early treatise on rowing technique.

Apart from his scientific work, Bourne was a keen soldier. He was an officer in the 4th (Militia) Battalion of The King's (Shropshire Light Infantry) from 1882 until 1897, when he resigned as captain and honorary major. On the outbreak of the Second Boer War in South Africa in late 1899, he re-entered the battalion and was appointed to the rank of major on 8 November 1899 and honorary lieutenant-colonel on 28 February 1900, serving as second in command while the battalion was stationed in Ireland. He later saw service during the First World War and was appointed Honorary Colonel of the 12th Battalion, the Gloucestershire Regiment.
