= Frank Gray (politician) =

British politician

Frank Gray

Francis James Gray (31 August 1880 – 2 March 1935) was a British politician and welfare campaigner. He served as a Liberal Member of Parliament for Oxford from 1922 to 1924.

== Background ==
He was born in Oxford and educated at Rugby School.

== Career ==
He was admitted as a solicitor in 1903; he retired from law in 1916, and entered the Army. He refused a commission, and served as a private soldier in the Oxfordshire and Buckinghamshire Light Infantry and The Princess Charlotte of Wales's (Royal Berkshire Regiment) until the Armistice. In 1920 he published The Confessions of a Private.

After the war, he worked as a farm labourer, lived with Warwickshire miners, and toured the workhouses of Oxfordshire as a tramp. He wrote the book The Tramp: his Meaning and Being (London: Dent, 1931).

== Politics ==
In the 1918 general election he contested Watford. He was elected as the MP for Oxford in the 1922 general election

General election 1922 Electorate 25,254
Party	Candidate	Votes	%	±%
Liberal	Frank Gray	12,489	59.0	+29.7
Unionist	John Arthur Ransome Marriott	8,683	41.0	−29.7
Majority		3,806	18.0	59.4
Turnout			83.8	+28.6
Liberal gain from Unionist		Swing	+29.7	

He was made a Liberal whip. He was re-elected in 1923;

General election 1923 Electorate 26,270
Party	Candidate	Votes	%	±%
Liberal	Frank Gray	12,311	56.1	−2.9
Unionist	Robert Croft Bourne	9,618	43.9	+2.9
Majority		2,693	12.2	−5.8
Turnout		21,929	83.5	−0.3
Liberal hold		Swing	-2.9	

He was accused of corrupt practices in the 1923 general election. Following a petition raised by his Unionist opponent, he was unseated by the courts on 14 May 1924 because his agent had falsified the account for his expenses. He was acquitted of corrupt practices but prevented from standing for parliament for seven years. In 1930 Oxford Liberal Association approached him to stand as their candidate at the next General Election but he declined.

In 1926, he crossed Africa from the Atlantic to the Red Sea in a car.

He died while returning from South Africa to Southampton, having travelled there for his health.

== See also ==
- 1924 Oxford by-election

Parliament of the United Kingdom
Preceded by John Arthur Ransome Marriott	Member of Parliament for Oxford; 1922–1924	Succeeded by Robert Croft Bourne
