= John Brooke, 1st Baron Cobham =

John Brooke, 1st Baron Cobham (15 August 1575 - 1660) was an English politician who sat in the House of Commons at various times between 1614 and 1643. He supported the Royalist cause in the English Civil War.

Brooke was the son of Hon. Henry Brooke and his wife Anne Sutton, daughter of Sir Henry Sutton of Nottinghamshire; his father was the fifth son of George Brooke, 9th Baron Cobham. In 1601 Brooke was in Paris learning French and in 1610 was journeying by sea and put into a port in Portugal. He was knighted in January 1612. In 1614, he was elected Member of Parliament for Gatton. He was elected MP for Oxford in 1621 and MP for Great Bedwyn in 1625. In May 1626 he was made senior Teller of the Exchequer. He lived at Heckington, Lincolnshire.

In November 1640 Brooke was elected MP for Appleby for the Long Parliament. In the civil war he granted a warrant for raising money for the King's service in Lincolnshire, and was disabled from sitting in parliament on 15 March 1643. He was created Baron Cobham on 3 January 1645.

Brooke died in 1660 and was buried at Wakerley, Northamptonshire on 20 May 1660.

Brooke married firstly Anne, who died in February 1625, and secondly Francis Bampfield, daughter of Sir William Bampfield.

Parliament of England
Preceded by Sir Thomas Gresham; Sir Nicholas Saunders	Member of Parliament for Gatton; 1614; With: Sir Thomas Gresham	Succeeded by Sir Thomas Gresham; Sir Thomas Bludder
Preceded by Sir John Astley; Thomas Wentworth	Member of Parliament for Oxford; 1621–1622; With: Thomas Wentworth	Succeeded by John Whistler; Thomas Wentworth
Preceded by Hugh Crompton; William Cholmeley	Member of Parliament for Great Bedwyn; 1625; With: William Cholmeley	Succeeded by John Selden; Sir Maurice Berkeley
Preceded by Richard Boyle; Richard Lowther	Member of Parliament for Appleby; 1640–1643; With: Richard Boyle	Succeeded by Richard Salwey; Henry Ireton
Peerage of England
New creation	Baron Cobham; 1645–1660	Extinct
