= 1868 Oxford by-election =

UK parliamentary by-election

The 1868 Oxford by-election was fought on 22 December 1868. The by-election was fought due to the incumbent Liberal, Edward Cardwell, becoming Secretary of State for War. It was retained by Cardwell who was unopposed.
