= John Spicer (died c. 1428) =

English Member of Parliament (died c. 1428)

John Spicer (died c. 1428), of Oxford, was an English Member of Parliament (MP) and draper.

He was a Member of the Parliament of England for Oxford in 1399, 1402 and January 1404. He had a son, John Spicer, junior.
