= John Hampton (Oxford) =

Mayor of Oxford, England

John Hampton (died 1328, aka John de Hampton) was a Mayor of Oxford, England.

In Oxford, Hampton was elected Junior Bailiff in 1307 and then Senior Bailiff in 1311. He was Mayor of Oxford three times, during 1319–20, 1320–1, and 1322–3. Hampton died in 1328 and left 6 marks to men who would go on a pilgrimage to the Holy Land for him when the king went there. As Mayor, he witnessed charters, now held by the Bodleian Library in Oxford.

== Hampton Hall ==
John Hampton owned Hampton Hall in Turl Street, Oxford. This was on the site of the chapel quadrangle of Lincoln College, within St Mildred's parish. Previously, this Hall belonged to Richard Bodyn around 1240, when it was called Bodyn Hall.
