= Unton Croke (died 1694) =

English soldier, lawyer and politician

Unton Croke (died 1694) was an English soldier, lawyer and politician during the Interregnum. He was the son of the elder Unton Croke.

He was an officer in the New Model Army. His most notable achievement was defeating the Penruddock uprising at South Molton in Devon in 1655, and capturing its leaders.

He was appointed High Sheriff of Oxfordshire in 1658. He was elected MP for Oxford in the Third Protectorate Parliament in 1659.

He was survived by five daughters.
