= John Whistler (MP) =

English politician

John Whistler (c. 1580 – 1647) was an English lawyer and politician who sat in the House of Commons at various times between 1624 and 1644. He supported the Royalist cause in the English Civil War.

Whistler was the son of Hugh Whistler of Milton Parva, Oxfordshire. He matriculated at Trinity College, Oxford on 14 October 1597 aged 17 and was awarded BA on 17 February 1601. He entered Gray's Inn on 4 May 1601 and was called to the bar in 1611. He succeeded his father after 1612, and held a number of positions in his Inn, serving as reader of Staple Inn in 1620, and of Gray's Inn in 1628. He became a bencher of Gray's Inn in 1629, dean of the chapel in 1635, and treasurer between 1639 and 1640. In 1623 he was made deputy recorder of Oxford to Thomas Wentworth. In that same year he was also made a freeman of the city, served as a fee'd counsel and was appointed a justice of the peace for Oxford.

In 1624, Whistler was elected member of parliament for Oxford. He was re-elected MP for Oxford in 1625, 1626 and 1628 and sat until 1629 when King Charles decided to rule without parliament for eleven years. He succeeded Wentworth as recorder of Oxford on his death in 1627.

Whistler contested Oxford again in March 1640 but was defeated. He was successful in November 1640 in gaining re-election for the Long Parliament. He supported the King and attended the Oxford Parliament in 1644, which caused him to be disabled from sitting in the House of Commons, probably in January 1644. He never married, and died in 1647, being buried at Little Haseley on 2 April 1647.

Parliament of England
Preceded by Sir John Brooke; Thomas Wentworth	Member of Parliament for Oxford; 1624–1629; With: Thomas Wentworth 1624–1626; Thomas Wentworth 1628–1629	Parliament suspended until 1640
Vacant Parliament suspended since 1629	Member of Parliament for Oxford; 1640–1644; With: Viscount Andover; John Smith	Succeeded by John Nixon; John Doyley
