= Francis Leigh (MP for Oxford) =

English barrister and politician

Sir Francis Leigh (c. 1579 – 1625) was an English barrister and politician who sat in the House of Commons between 1597 and 1622.

Leigh was the eldest surviving son of Sir William Leigh of Newnham Regis and his wife Frances Harington, daughter of Sir James Harington of Exton. He entered Middle Temple in 1597 and in the same year was elected Member of Parliament for Weymouth and Melcombe Regis. By 1600 he was a member of the Antiquarian Society. In 1601 he was elected MP for Oxford. He was knighted with the Order of the Bath in 1603 and was a gentleman of the privy chamber to James I. He was re-elected MP for Oxford in 1604. In 1614 he became master of requests and in the same year, he was elected MP for Leicester. He was High Sheriff of Warwickshire from 1618 to 1619 and by 1621 was a J.P. for Warwickshire. In 1621 he was elected MP for Warwickshire.

Leigh died between 7 February 1625 when he made his will and 6 January 1626 when it was proved.

Leigh married Mary Egerton, daughter of Thomas Egerton, 1st Viscount Brackley before 1601 and had two sons and three daughters. His son Francis became Earl of Chichester.

Parliament of England
Preceded by	Member of Parliament for Weymouth and Melcombe Regis; 1597	Succeeded by
Preceded by Anthony Bacon; George Calfield	Member of Parliament for Oxford; 1601–1611; With: George Calfield; Thomas Wentworth	Succeeded by Sir John Ashley; Thomas Wentworth
Preceded by Henry Beaumont; Henry Rich	Member of Parliament for Leicester; 1614; With: Henry Rich	Succeeded by Sir Richard Moryson; Sir William Herrick
Preceded by Sir Richard Verney; Sir Thomas Lucy	Member of Parliament for Warwickshire; 1621–1622; With: Sir Thomas Lucy	Succeeded by Sir Thomas Lucy; Sir Clement Throckmorton
