= Thomas Somerset (MP for Oxford) =

Member of the Parliament of England

Thomas Somerset or Pophull (fl. 1379–1393, died between 1396 and 1399) was an English politician and draper.

== Family ==
Somerset lived in St. Martin's parish, near Carfax, Oxford, with his wife, Helen, and their one son. Helen died in 1399. Somerset was last recorded in 1396. There is no record of their son after their deaths.

== Career ==
He was a Member (MP) of the Parliament of England for Oxford in 1379 and February 1388. He was Mayor of Oxford in 1392–93.
