= John Nixon (MP) =

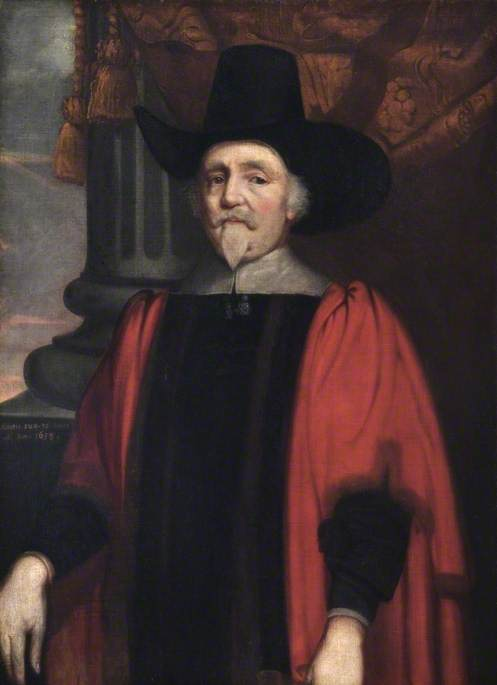
John Nixon (1658)

John Nixon (1588 – 14 April 1662) was an English politician who sat in the House of Commons from 1646 to 1653.

== Biography ==
Nixon was the son of William Nixon, a husbandman of Blechington and his wife Joan Silvester. He became a merchant at Oxford and acquired a considerable fortune. On 2 October 1622 he was elected on to the Common Council, and in 1623 became bailiff. He was admitted a freeman on 3 February 1625 and in 1627 was elected senior bailiff. He became mayor of Oxford in 1636. In April 1638 he was elected an Alderman. As a zealous puritan, he was a witness against Archbishop Laud at his trial. Although he was a prominent Parliamentarian, in 1642 he contributed four pounds of powder and two pieces of match to a general royalist fund. However, in 1643 he fled from Oxford when the King was on his way and the then mayor on the advice of the king recommended that he and other aldermen and councillors who had left the city should be disfranchised, forfeit the freedom of the city, and be deprived of any offices they held in the city. In June 1646, five days after the Royalist troops began evacuating Oxford, the act of disenfranchisement was repealed and Nixon was restored to his freedom and his place on the council. He was elected mayor of Oxford again in 1646.

In December 1646, Nixon was elected Member of Parliament for Oxford as a recruiter to the Long Parliament. In October 1647, a Parliamentary Order of 4 October demanded "the Continuance of the old Mayor and Bayliffes in theire places until further order", and Nixon continued as Mayor in place of the mayor chosen for 1647. He was a commissioner for assessment for Oxford in 1649 and was appointed one of the City Coroners in 1653. He was mayor of Oxford for the third time in 1654.

In 1658, Nixon founded a free school for the sons of freemen. It opened at Guildhall Yard in 1659, and survived for 235 years until 1894. In January 1659 Nixon stood for parliament again but was unsuccessful. He was appointed commissioner for assessment for Oxford in 1660. In May 1661 he was reported to be unable to do the work of a Commissioner of Barges "owing to his weakness of body", but in August he took part in the procession that went out to meet Charles II, wearing a scarlet gown and tippet.

Nixon died in 1662 and was buried on 17 April at St Mary's Church with the following epitaph on his monument.

John Nixon of this Citty Alderman
Ended that race he 73 yeares ran
n April 62. no merits he
Owned bvt Christs yet by its frvit the tree
Is to be knowne. Twice 20 free schoole boyes
Immortalize his name, and with less noyse,
Farr greater bovnties were disperst vnknowne,
Except to reapers where his seed was sowne.
May many more this worthy pattern lye,
A good faire copie for posterity.

Nixon married Joan Stevenson of Weston-on-the-Green. There are portraits of John Nixon and his wife in Oxford's Town Hall.

Parliament of England
Preceded by John Whistler; John Smith	Member of Parliament for Oxford; 1646–1653; With: John Doyley 1646–1648	Succeeded by Not represented in Barebones Parliament
