= Richard Lowther (died 1659) =

English lawyer and politician (1583–1659)

Richard Lowther (ca. 1583 – April 1659) was an English lawyer and politician who sat in the House of Commons in 1640.

Lowther was the son of Sir Christopher Lowther, of Lowther, Westmorland and his wife Eleanor Musgrave, daughter of William Musgrave of Hayton Cumberland. He matriculated at Queen's College, Oxford on 14 May 1602, aged 18, and was awarded BA on 22 February 1605. He was called to the bar at Gray's Inn in 1614. He was of St. Giles, Cripplegate and was a J.P. for Middlesex. He was elected MP for Appleby for the Short Parliament in April 1640.

His cousin of the same name, Richard Lowther (1602-1645), was a Member of Parliament in 1626–28; he is sometimes mistakenly identified with this Richard.

Lowther founded a school in 1638 which was built at Lowther in 1640.

Lowther died at the age of about 75 and was buried in Lothbury church.

Parliament of England
Vacant Parliament suspended since 1629	Member of Parliament for Appleby; 1640; With: Richard Boyle	Succeeded by Sir John Brooke; Richard Boyle
