= Kathleen Lower =

British politician and first woman Lord Mayor of Oxford

Florence Kathleen Lower (10 July 1905 – 21 June 1995) was Lord Mayor of Oxford in 1965–66. Lower was the first woman to be Lord Mayor of Oxford.

== Early life ==
Florence Kathleen (known as Kathleen, and, informally, Kitty) Coppard was born in Brighton in 1905 to James Coppard & his wife Florence (née Ranger).

== Alderman and Lord Mayor ==
Lower was a Labour Alderman, and was the first woman to be elected Lord Mayor for the year 1965–66. Four women had previously been Mayors of Oxford, before the office was raised to that of Lord Mayor in 1962.

Lower had the honour of driving the last steam railway engine (6998 Burton Agnes Hall) to leave the Oxford depot in 1966. She was appointed an Officer of the Order of the British Empire (OBE) in the 1966 New Year Honours.

== Personal life ==
Lower married Marcus Lower (1900–1986) in 1929. They had one son, Alan. Marcus Lower was Mayor (before Oxford was elevated to having a Lord Mayor) in 1955–56. She died in Cornwall in 1995, aged 89.
