= Walter Fraser Oakeshott =

British educator (1903–1987)

Sir Walter Fraser Oakeshott
- Born: 11 November 1903; Transvaal Colony
- Died: 13 October 1987 (aged 83); Eynsham, Oxfordshire, United Kingdom
- Education: Tonbridge School, Kent & Balliol College, Oxford
- Spouse: Noël Rose Moon (1928–1976) [her death]
- Children: Twin sons and two daughters
- Writing career
- Genre: Classics
- Subject: Criticism
- Notable works: Sigena: Romanesque Painting in Spain & the Winchester Bible Artists; Founded Upon the Seas

Sir Walter Fraser Oakeshott FBA (11 November 1903 – 13 October 1987) was a Transvaal-born British schoolmaster and academic, who was Vice-Chancellor of the University of Oxford. He is best known for discovering the Winchester Manuscript of Sir Thomas Malory's Le Morte d'Arthur in 1934.

== Biography ==
Oakeshott was born on 11 November 1903 in Transvaal Colony, the second son of doctor Walter Field Oakeshott and his wife Mabel Kathleen (nee Fraser). His father practised in Lydenburg, Transvaal. After the death of his father, his mother brought the family back to England. From 1917 Oakeshott was educated at Tonbridge School, where he eventually became School Captain (Head of School). He won a Classics exhibition to Balliol College, Oxford in 1922, graduating in 1926 with first class honours.

After graduation, Oakeshott taught at various schools. His first post was at Tooting Bec School, London, followed by the Merchant Taylors' School in 1927. From 1931 to 1938, he worked for Winchester College as an Assistant Master, where in 1934 he made his discovery of the Winchester Manuscript in their Fellows' Library.

From 1936 to 1937, he took a leave of absence from teaching to serve on an inquiry into unemployment sponsored by the Pilgrim Trust, the findings of which were written up as Men without Work by William Temple (1938).

Following the enquiry, Oakeshott returned to teaching, becoming High Master of St Paul's School, London in 1939, where he supervised the school's evacuation to Crowthorne in Berkshire. In 1946, he returned to Winchester College as headmaster, where he remained until elected Rector of Lincoln College, Oxford in 1954. He remained in this post until 1972, but also served as Vice-Chancellor of the University of Oxford between 1962 and 1964. His portrait was made by Jean Cooke, who had been commissioned for the work by Lincoln College.

Oakeshott was elected as a member of the Roxburghe Club for bibliophiles in 1949. In the 1980 Birthday Honours it was announced that Oakeshott was to be awarded the honour of Knight Bachelor by the Queen, for "services to medieval literature". He also received honorary doctorates from the University of St. Andrews and UEA (1984).

== The Winchester Manuscript of Malory's Le Morte d'Arthur ==
All editions of the Morte prior to 1934 were based on the edition printed by Caxton. In June of that year, when the library of Winchester College was being catalogued, Oakeshott discovered a previously unknown manuscript copy – this was one of the most important medieval manuscripts discovered in the twentieth century. Newspaper accounts appearing on 25 June, 26 June, 25 August and 27 September 1934 outlined to the public the unfolding story of the recognition that what Caxton had published in 1485 was not necessarily exactly what Malory had written. The "Winchester Manuscript" is regarded as being mostly, but not always, closer to Malory's original than is Caxton's text, although both derive separately from an earlier copy. Curiously, microscopic examination of ink smudges on the Winchester manuscript showed the marks to be offsets of newly printed pages set in Caxton's own font, indicating that same manuscript had been in Caxton's print shop. Unlike the Caxton edition, the Winchester MS is not divided into books and chapters. Indeed, in his preface, Caxton takes credit for the division.

Eugène Vinaver, an already-established Malory scholar, arrived in Winchester on 27 June asking to see the manuscript. Though he was encouraged to produce an edition himself, Oakeshott acknowledged Vinaver's editorial superiority and eventually ceded the project to him. But on the basis of his initial study of the manuscript, Oakeshott concluded as early as 1935 that the copy from which Caxton printed his edition "was already subdivided into books and sections." Based on a more exhaustive study of the manuscript alongside Caxton's edition, Vinaver reached similar conclusions, and in his 1947 edition – polemically entitled The Works of Sir Thomas Malory – Vinaver argued strongly that Malory had in fact not written a single book, but produced a series of Arthurian tales which were internally consistent and independent works. The unity of the work has been a subject of some controversy among scholars since.

Oakeshott published an account of his remarkable discovery, "The Finding of the Manuscript," in 1963, chronicling the initial event and his realisation that "this indeed was Malory," with "startling evidence of revision" in the Caxton edition. In his account he mentions the visit of T. E. Lawrence ('Lawrence of Arabia') to see the manuscript.

== Books by and about Oakeshott ==
- Commerce and Society: a Short History of Trade and its Effects on Civilization. Oxford: Clarendon Press, 1936.
- Founded Upon the Seas: A Narrative of Some English Maritime and Overseas Enterprises During the Period 1550–1616, by Walter Fraser Oakeshott. Cambridge: Cambridge University Press, 1942. Reissued by Ayer Company Publishers, 1973. ISBN 978-0-8369-7233-7.
- The Sword of the Spirit: A Meditative and Devotional Anthology. London: Faber & Faber, 1950.
- The Sequence of English Medieval Art. London: Faber & Faber, 1950.
- Renaissance Maps of the World and their Presuppositions. Manchester: John Rylands Library, 1962.
- The Mosaics of Rome, From the Third to the Fourteenth Centuries. London: Thames & Hudson, 1967.
- Sigena: Romanesque Painting in Spain & the Winchester Bible Artists, London: Harvey, Miller and Medcalf, 1972. ISBN 0-8212-0497-1
- Two Winchester Bibles. Oxford: Clarendon Press, 1981.
- John C. Dancy: Walter Oakeshott: A Diversity of Gifts. Norwich: Michael Russell, 1995.

Academic offices
| Preceded by Arthur Lionel Pugh Norrington | Vice-Chancellor of Oxford University; 1962–1964 | Succeeded by Kenneth Clinton Wheare |
| Preceded by Keith Murray | Rector of Lincoln College, Oxford; 1953–1972 | Succeeded by Burke Trend |
| Preceded by Spencer Leeson | Headmaster of Winchester College; 1946–1954 | Succeeded by Henry Desmond Pritchard Lee |
| Preceded by John Bell | High Master of St Paul's School, London; 1938–1946 | Succeeded by Robert Leoline James |
