= Oxford (constituency) =

Parliamentary constituency in the United Kingdom 1801-1983

Coordinates: 51.75°N 1.26°W

- Former borough constituency for the House of Commons
- County: Oxfordshire
- Major settlements: Oxford

1295–1983
- Seats: 1295–1885: Two; 1885–1983: One
- Replaced by: Oxford East and Oxford West and Abingdon

Oxford was a parliamentary constituency in the United Kingdom, comprising the city of Oxford in the county of Oxfordshire.

== History ==
The parliamentary borough of Oxford elected two Members of Parliament to the House of Commons of the Parliament of England from its creation in 1295 to 1707, then of the Parliament of Great Britain from 1707 to 1800 and of the Parliament of the United Kingdom from 1801. In 1885, its representation was reduced to one member by the Redistribution of Seats Act 1885 and it was abolished in 1983 as a result of the Third Periodic Review of Westminster constituencies.

During the 1960s and 1970s, Oxford was a marginal seat.

== Boundaries and boundary changes ==
=== 1918–1950 ===
The County Borough of Oxford.

The boundaries were expanded to coincide with the County Borough.

=== 1950–1983 ===
As above, with redrawn boundaries.

Areas which had been absorbed by the County Borough of Oxford, including Cowley and Headington, transferred from the Henley constituency. Small area in the north also transferred from Banbury.

In the 1983 redistribution, the Oxford constituency disappeared and was split into two distinct constituencies: Oxford East, and Oxford West and Abingdon. The City of Oxford local government district had succeeded the County Borough of Oxford on 1 April 1974, as outlined in the Local Government Act 1972, and the redistribution was a reflection of this change. Oxford West and Abingdon encompassed Oxford city centre at the time, but Oxford East primarily comprised the majority of the new district. From 2010, the city centre was situated within the redrawn Oxford East constituency until 2024 when it was transferred back into Oxford West and Abingdon.

== Members of Parliament ==
=== 1295–1640 ===
Parliament	First member	Second member
1379	Edmund Kenyan	Thomas Somerset
1380 (Nov)	Edmund Kenyan	
1381	Edmund Kenyan	
1382 (May)	Edmund Kenyan	
1385	Edmund Kenyan	
1386	Edmund Kenyan	Thomas Houkyn
1388 (Feb)	John Hickes	Thomas Somerset
1388 (Sep)	John Shawe	Thomas Baret
1390 (Jan)	Richard Garston	Alan Lekensfeld
1390 (Nov)	Edmund Kenyan	Adam de la River
1391	Edmund Kenyan	John Ottworth
1393	Richard Garston	John Merston
1394	Edmund Kenyan	John Forster
1395	John Ludlow	Adam de la River
1397 (Jan)	Walter Benham	Adam de la River
1397 (Sep)	John Ottworth	Adam de la River
1399	John Spicer	John Burbridge
1401	Thomas Forsthull	Adam de la River
1402	Walter Benham	John Spicer
1404 (Jan)	Thomas Coventre	John Spicer
1404 (Oct)	John Merston	Michael Salisbury
1406	John Ottworth	Thomas Cowley
1407	Thomas Coventre	Hugh Benet
1410	Thomas Coventre	Hugh Benet
1411		
1413 (Feb)		
1413 (May)	Thomas Coventre	Hugh Benet
1414 (Apr)	John Shawe II	Walter Colet
1414 (Nov)	Thomas Coventre	John Merston
1415		
1416 (Mar)	Thomas Coventre	William Brampton
1416 (Oct)		
1417	Thomas Coventre	Hugh Benet
1419	Thomas Coventre	William Brampton
1420	Thomas Coventre	William Offord
1421 (May)	Thomas Coventre	William Brampton
1421 (Dec)	John Quarame	William Offord
1491	Robert Caxton	
1510–1523	No names known	
1529	John Latton	William Fleming
1536	?John Latton	?William Fleming
1539	Thomas Denton	Richard Gunter
1542	?	
1545	?	
1547	Ralph Flaxney	Edward Frere
1553 (Mar)	Christopher Edmonds	Edward Glynton
1553 (Oct)	John Wayte	Thomas Williams
1554 (Apr)	Thomas Mallinson	Edward Glynton
1554 (Nov)	John Wayte	William Tylcock
1555	John Wayte	William Pantre
1558	John Barton	Richard Williams
1559 (Jan)	Thomas Wood	Roger Taylor
1562 (Dec)	William Page	Thomas Wood
1571	Edward Knollys	William Frere
1572 (Apr)	Edward Knollys, died and replaced 1576 by Francis Knollys	William Owen, died and replaced Jan 1581 by Edward Norris
1584 (Oct)	Francis Knollys	William Noble
1586 (Sep)	Francis Knollys	George Calfield
1588 (Oct)	Francis Knollys	George Calfield
1593	Sir Edmund Carey	George Calfield
1597 (Aug)	Anthony Bacon	George Calfield
1601 (Sep)	Sir Francis Leigh	George Calfield
1604	Francis Leigh	Thomas Wentworth
1614	Sir John Astley	Thomas Wentworth
1621–1622	Sir John Brooke	Thomas Wentworth
1624	John Whistler	Thomas Wentworth
1625	John Whistler	Thomas Wentworth
1626	John Whistler	Thomas Wentworth
1628–1629	John Whistler	Thomas Wentworth
1629–1640	No Parliaments convened	

=== 1640–1885 ===
Year	First member	First party	Second member	Second party
April 1640	Viscount Andover	Royalist	John Whistler	Royalist
1640 (Nov)	John Smith	Royalist	John Whistler	Royalist
1644	Smith and Whistler disabled from sitting – both seats vacant			
1645	John Nixon		John Doyley	
December 1648	Nixon and Doyley excluded in Pride's Purge – both seats vacant			
1653	Oxford was unrepresented in the Barebones Parliament			
1654	Bulstrode Whitelocke		Oxford had only one seat in the First and Second Parliaments of the Protectorate	
1654	Richard Croke		Oxford had only one seat in the First and Second Parliaments of the Protectorate	
1656	Richard Croke		Oxford had only one seat in the First and Second Parliaments of the Protectorate	
January 1659	Richard Croke		Major Unton Croke	Parliamentarian
May 1659	Not represented in the restored Rump			
April 1660	The Viscount Falkland		James Huxley	
1661	Richard Croke		Brome Whorwood	
1679	William Wright		Brome Whorwood	
1685	Hon. Henry Bertie		Sir George Pudsey	
1689	Hon. Henry Bertie		Sir Edward Norreys	Tory
1695	Thomas Rowney	Tory	Sir Edward Norreys	Tory
1701	Thomas Rowney	Tory	Francis Norreys	Tory
1706	Thomas Rowney	Tory	Sir John Walter	Tory
March 1722	Thomas Rowney, junior	Tory	Sir John Walter	Tory
October 1722	Thomas Rowney, junior	Tory	Francis Knollys	Tory
1734	Thomas Rowney, junior	Tory	Matthew Skinner	
1739	Thomas Rowney, junior	Tory	James Herbert	
1740	Thomas Rowney, junior	Tory	Philip Herbert	
1749	Thomas Rowney, junior	Tory	Philip Wenman	
1754	Thomas Rowney, junior	Tory	Hon. Robert Lee	
1759	Sir Thomas Stapleton		Hon. Robert Lee	
1768	George Nares		Lieutenant-Colonel the Hon. William Harcourt	
1771	Lord Robert Spencer		Lieutenant-Colonel the Hon. William Harcourt	
1774	Lord Robert Spencer		Captain the Hon. Peregrine Bertie	
June 1790	Francis Burton		Captain the Hon. Peregrine Bertie	
December 1790	Francis Burton		Arthur Annesley	
1796	Francis Burton		Henry Peters	
1802	Francis Burton		John Atkyns-Wright	
1807	Francis Burton		John Ingram Lockhart	
1812	John Atkyns-Wright		John Ingram Lockhart	
1818	John Atkyns-Wright		Frederick St John	
1820	Charles Wetherell	Tory	John Ingram Lockhart	
1826	James Langston	Whig	John Ingram Lockhart	
1830	James Langston	Whig	William Hughes Hughes	Whig
1832	James Langston	Whig	Thomas Stonor	Whig
1833	James Langston	Whig	William Hughes Hughes	Whig
1835	Donald Maclean	Conservative	William Hughes Hughes	Conservative
1837	Donald Maclean	Conservative	William Erle	Whig
1841	Donald Maclean	Conservative	James Langston	Whig
1847	(Sir) William Wood	Radical	James Langston	Whig
1853	Edward Cardwell	Peelite	James Langston	Whig
March 1857	Charles Neate	Whig	James Langston	Whig
July 1857	Edward Cardwell	Peelite	James Langston	Whig
1859	Edward Cardwell	Liberal	James Langston	Liberal
1863	Edward Cardwell	Liberal	Charles Neate	Liberal
1868	Edward Cardwell	Liberal	(Sir) William Vernon Harcourt	Liberal
1874	Alexander William Hall	Conservative	(Sir) William Vernon Harcourt	Liberal
April 1880	Joseph William Chitty	Liberal	(Sir) William Vernon Harcourt	Liberal
May 1880	Joseph William Chitty	Liberal	Alexander William Hall	Conservative
1881	Joseph William Chitty	Liberal	Writ suspended – seat vacant	
September 1881	Writ suspended – seat vacant		Writ suspended – seat vacant	
1885	Representation reduced to one member			

=== 1885–1983 ===
Election	Member	Party
1885	Alexander William Hall	Conservative
1892	Sir George Tomkyns Chesney	Conservative
1895	Arthur Annesley	Conservative
1917 by-election	John Marriott	Coalition Conservative
1922	Frank Gray	Liberal
1924 by-election	Robert Bourne	Unionist
1938 by-election	Quintin Hogg	Conservative
1950 by-election	Lawrence Turner	Conservative
1959	Montague Woodhouse	Conservative
1966	Evan Luard	Labour
1970	Montague Woodhouse	Conservative
Oct 1974	Evan Luard	Labour
1979	John Patten	Conservative
1983	constituency abolished: see Oxford East & Oxford West and Abingdon	

== Elections ==
=== Elections in the 1830s ===
General election 1830: Oxford (2 seats)
Party	Candidate	Votes	%	±%
Whig	James Langston	1,108	38.1	
Whig	William Hughes Hughes	1,054	36.2	
Nonpartisan	John Ingram Lockhart	750	25.8	
Majority		304	10.4	
Turnout		1,779	c. 80.9	
Registered electors		c. 2,200		
Whig hold		Swing		
Whig gain from Nonpartisan		Swing		

General election 1831: Oxford (2 seats)
Party	Candidate	Votes	%
Whig	James Langston	Unopposed	
Whig	William Hughes Hughes	Unopposed	
Registered electors		c. 2,200	
Whig hold			
Whig hold			

General election 1832: Oxford (2 seats)
Party	Candidate	Votes	%
Whig	James Langston	1,260	34.5
Whig	Thomas Stonor	953	26.1
Whig	William Hughes Hughes	919	25.1
Tory	Charles Wetherell	523	14.3
Majority		430	11.8
Turnout		2,139	92.5
Registered electors		2,312	
Whig hold			
Whig hold			

Stonor's election was declared void on petition, causing a by-election.

By-election, 18 March 1833: Oxford
Party	Candidate	Votes	%	±%
Whig	William Hughes Hughes	803	40.8	+15.7
Whig	Charles Towneley	702	35.7	N/A
Tory	Donald Maclean	462	23.5	+9.2
Majority		101	5.1	−6.7
Turnout		1,967	85.1	−7.4
Registered electors		2,312		
Whig hold		Swing	+3.3	

General election 1835: Oxford (2 seats)
Party	Candidate	Votes	%	±%
Conservative	William Hughes Hughes	1,394	38.4	+13.3
Conservative	Donald Maclean	1,217	33.5	+19.2
Whig	Thomas Stonor	1,022	28.1	−32.5
Majority		195	5.4	N/A
Turnout		2,200	90.3	−2.2
Registered electors		2,436		
Conservative gain from Whig		Swing	+14.8	
Conservative gain from Whig		Swing	+17.7	

General election 1837: Oxford (2 seats)
Party	Candidate	Votes	%	±%
Conservative	Donald Maclean	1,348	38.9	+5.4
Whig	William Erle	1,217	35.2	+7.1
Conservative	William Hughes Hughes	897	25.9	−12.5
Turnout		2,115	87.3	−3.0
Registered electors		2,424		
Majority		131	3.7	−1.7
Conservative hold		Swing	+0.9	
Majority		320	9.3	N/A
Whig gain from Conservative		Swing	+7.1	

=== Elections in the 1840s ===
General election 1841: Oxford (2 seats)
Party	Candidate	Votes	%	±%
Whig	James Langston	1,349	37.2	+2.0
Conservative	Donald Maclean	1,238	34.1	−4.8
Conservative	Neil Malcolm	1,041	28.7	+2.8
Turnout		2,374	85.2	−2.1
Registered electors		2,786		
Majority		111	3.1	−6.2
Whig hold		Swing	+2.0	
Majority		197	5.4	+1.7
Conservative hold		Swing	−2.9	

General election 1847: Oxford (2 seats)
Party	Candidate	Votes	%	±%
Whig	James Langston	Unopposed		
Radical	William Wood	Unopposed		
Registered electors		2,819		
Whig hold				
Radical gain from Conservative				

=== Elections in the 1850s ===
Wood was appointed Solicitor General for England and Wales, requiring a by-election.

By-election, 3 April 1851: Oxford
Party	Candidate	Votes	%	±%
Radical	William Wood	Unopposed		
Radical hold				

General election 1852: Oxford (2 seats)
Party	Candidate	Votes	%	±%
Radical	William Wood	Unopposed		
Whig	James Langston	Unopposed		
Registered electors		2,818		
Radical hold				
Whig hold				

Wood resigned after being appointed Vice-Chancellor, causing a by-election.

By-election, 4 January 1853: Oxford
Party	Candidate	Votes	%	±%
Peelite	Edward Cardwell	Unopposed		
Peelite gain from Radical				

General election 1857: Oxford (2 seats)
Party	Candidate	Votes	%	±%
Whig	James Langston	1,671	41.9	N/A
Whig	Charles Neate	1,057	26.5	N/A
Peelite	Edward Cardwell	1,016	25.5	N/A
Radical	Stephen Gaselee	245	6.1	N/A
Majority		41	1.0	N/A
Turnout		1,995 (est)	75.1 (est)	N/A
Registered electors		2,656		
Whig hold		Swing	N/A	
Whig gain from Peelite		Swing	N/A	

Neate's election was declared void on petition due to bribery, causing a by-election.

By-election, 21 July 1857: Oxford
Party	Candidate	Votes	%	±%
Peelite	Edward Cardwell	1,085	51.6	+26.1
Independent Liberal	William Makepeace Thackeray	1,018	48.4%	New
Majority		67	3.1	N/A
Turnout		2,103	79.2	+4.1
Registered electors		2,656		
Peelite gain from Whig		Swing	N/A	

General election 1859: Oxford (2 seats)
Party	Candidate	Votes	%	±%
Liberal	James Langston	Unopposed		
Liberal	Edward Cardwell	Unopposed		
Registered electors		2,731		
Liberal hold				
Liberal hold				

Cardwell was appointed Chief Secretary to the Lord Lieutenant of Ireland, requiring a by-election.

By-election, 27 June 1859: Oxford
Party	Candidate	Votes	%	±%
Liberal	Edward Cardwell	Unopposed		
Liberal hold				

=== Elections in the 1860s ===
Cardwell was appointed Chancellor of the Duchy of Lancaster, requiring a by-election.

By-election, 30 July 1861: Oxford
Party	Candidate	Votes	%	±%
Liberal	Edward Cardwell	Unopposed		
Liberal hold				

Langston's death caused a by-election.

By-election, 7 November 1863: Oxford
Party	Candidate	Votes	%	±%
Liberal	Charles Neate	Unopposed		
Liberal hold				

Cardwell was appointed Secretary of State for the Colonies, requiring a by-election.

By-election, 9 April 1864: Oxford
Party	Candidate	Votes	%	±%
Liberal	Edward Cardwell	Unopposed		
Liberal hold				

General election 1865: Oxford (2 seats)
Party	Candidate	Votes	%	±%
Liberal	Edward Cardwell	Unopposed		
Liberal	Charles Neate	Unopposed		
Registered electors		2,594		
Liberal hold				
Liberal hold				

General election 1868: Oxford (2 seats)
Party	Candidate	Votes	%	±%
Liberal	Edward Cardwell	2,765	41.7	N/A
Liberal	William Vernon Harcourt	2,636	39.8	N/A
Conservative	James Parker Deane	1,225	18.5	New
Majority		1,411	21.3	N/A
Turnout		3,926 (est)	73.7 (est)	N/A
Registered electors		5,328		
Liberal hold		Swing	N/A	
Liberal hold		Swing	N/A	

Cardwell was appointed Secretary of State for War, requiring a by-election.

By-election, 22 December 1868: Oxford
Party	Candidate	Votes	%	±%
Liberal	Edward Cardwell	Unopposed		
Liberal hold				

=== Elections in the 1870s ===
Harcourt was appointed Solicitor General for England and Wales, causing a by-election.

1873 Oxford by-election (1 seat)
Party	Candidate	Votes	%	±%
Liberal	William Vernon Harcourt	Unopposed		
Liberal hold				

General election 1874: Oxford (2 seats)
Party	Candidate	Votes	%	±%
Liberal	William Vernon Harcourt	2,332	34.2	−5.6
Liberal	Edward Cardwell	2,281	33.5	−8.2
Conservative	Alexander William Hall	2,198	32.3	+13.8
Majority		83	1.2	−20.1
Turnout		4,505 (est)	79.3 (est)	+5.6
Registered electors		5,680		
Liberal hold		Swing	−6.3	
Liberal hold		Swing	−7.6	

Cardwell was elevated to the peerage, becoming Viscount Cardwell and causing a by-election.

1874 Oxford by-election (1 seat)
Party	Candidate	Votes	%	±%
Conservative	Alexander William Hall	2,554	55.0	+22.7
Liberal	John Delaware Lewis	2,092	45.0	−22.7
Majority		462	10.0	N/A
Turnout		4,646	81.8	+2.5
Registered electors		5,680		
Conservative gain from Liberal		Swing	+22.7	

=== Elections in the 1880s ===
General election 1880: Oxford (2 seats)
Party	Candidate	Votes	%	±%
Liberal	William Vernon Harcourt	2,771	34.2	0.0
Liberal	Joseph William Chitty	2,669	33.0	−0.5
Conservative	Alexander William Hall	2,659	32.8	+0.5
Majority		10	0.2	−1.0
Turnout		5,430 (est)	88.1 (est)	+8.8
Registered electors		6,163		
Liberal hold		Swing	−0.3	
Liberal hold		Swing	−0.4	

Harcourt was appointed Home Secretary, requiring a by-election.

1880 Oxford by-election (1 seat)
Party	Candidate	Votes	%	±%
Conservative	Alexander William Hall	2,735	50.5	+17.7
Liberal	William Vernon Harcourt	2,681	49.5	−17.7
Majority		54	1.0	N/A
Turnout		5,416	87.9	−0.2 (est)
Registered electors		6,163		
Conservative gain from Liberal		Swing	+17.7	

Hall's election was declared void, on account of bribery, and the writ was suspended.

In 1881, Chitty was appointed a judge and resigned the seat. However, as the writ was suspended, no by-election was held and the seat was left without an MP until 1885, when representation was also reduced to one member.

General election 1885: Oxford (1 seat)
Party	Candidate	Votes	%	±%
Conservative	Alexander William Hall	3,212	52.6	+19.8
Liberal	Charles Alan Fyffe	2,894	47.4	−19.8
Majority		318	5.2	N/A
Turnout		6,106	90.3	+2.2 (est)
Registered electors		6,764		
Conservative gain from Liberal		Swing	+19.8	

General election 1886: Oxford
Party	Candidate	Votes	%	±%
Conservative	Alexander William Hall	Unopposed		
Conservative hold				

=== Elections in the 1890s ===
General election 1892: Oxford
Party	Candidate	Votes	%	±%
Conservative	George Tomkyns Chesney	3,276	50.9	N/A
Liberal	Robinson Souttar	3,156	49.1	New
Majority		120	1.8	N/A
Turnout		6,432	86.0	N/A
Registered electors		7,476		
Conservative hold		Swing	N/A	

Chesney's death caused a by-election.

John Fletcher Little

1895 Oxford by-election
Party	Candidate	Votes	%	±%
Conservative	Arthur Annesley	3,745	54.4	+3.5
Liberal	John Fletcher Little	3,143	45.6	−3.5
Majority		602	8.8	N/A
Turnout		6,888	90.2	+4.2
Registered electors		7,637		
Conservative hold		Swing	+3.5	

General election 1895: Oxford
Party	Candidate	Votes	%	±%
Conservative	Arthur Annesley	3,623	54.9	+4.0
Liberal	Thomas Henry Kingerlee	2,975	45.1	−4.0
Majority		648	9.8	+8.0
Turnout		6,598	86.4	+0.4
Registered electors		7,637		
Conservative hold		Swing	+4.0	

Annesley's appointment as Comptroller of the Household, requiring a by-election.

1898 Oxford by-election
Party	Candidate	Votes	%	±%
Conservative	Arthur Annesley	Unopposed		
Conservative hold				

=== Elections in the 1900s ===
General election 1900: Oxford
Party	Candidate	Votes	%	±%
Conservative	Arthur Annesley	Unopposed		
Conservative hold				

General election 1906: Oxford
Party	Candidate	Votes	%	±%
Conservative	Arthur Annesley	3,910	50.6	N/A
Liberal	George Whale	3,810	49.4	New
Majority		100	1.2	N/A
Turnout		7,720	89.6	N/A
Registered electors		8,615		
Conservative hold		Swing	N/A	

=== Elections in the 1910s ===
General election January 1910: Oxford
Party	Candidate	Votes	%	±%
Conservative	Arthur Annesley	4,918	57.0	+6.4
Liberal	G. Whale	3,707	43.0	−6.4
Majority		1,211	14.0	+12.8
Turnout		8,625	93.5	+3.9
Registered electors		9,227		
Conservative hold		Swing	+6.4	

General election December 1910: Oxford
Party	Candidate	Votes	%	±%
Conservative	Arthur Annesley	4,664	58.4	+1.4
Liberal	J.F. Williams	3,318	41.6	−1.4
Majority		1,346	16.8	+2.8
Turnout		7,982	86.5	−7.0
Registered electors		9,227		
Conservative hold		Swing	+1.4	

1917 Oxford by-election
Party	Candidate	Votes	%	±%
Unionist	John Marriott	Unopposed		
Unionist hold				

General election 1918: Oxford
Party		Candidate	Votes	%	±%
C	Unionist	John Marriott	9,805	70.7	+12.3
	Liberal	George Herbert Higgins	4,057	29.3	−12.3
Majority			5,748	41.4	+24.6
Turnout			13,862	55.2	−31.3
	Unionist hold		Swing	+12.3	
C indicates candidate endorsed by the coalition government.

=== Elections in the 1920s ===
Gray

General election 1922: Oxford
Party	Candidate	Votes	%	±%
Liberal	Frank Gray	12,489	59.0	+29.7
Unionist	John Marriott	8,683	41.0	−29.7
Majority		3,806	18.0	N/A
Turnout		21,172	83.8	+28.6
Liberal gain from Unionist		Swing	+29.7	

General election 1923: Oxford
Party	Candidate	Votes	%	±%
Liberal	Frank Gray	12,311	56.1	−2.9
Unionist	Robert Bourne	9,618	43.9	+2.9
Majority		2,693	12.2	−5.8
Turnout		21,929	83.5	−0.3
Liberal hold		Swing	-2.9	

Fry

1924 Oxford by-election
Party	Candidate	Votes	%	±%
Unionist	Robert Bourne	10,079	47.8	+3.9
Liberal	C.B. Fry	8,237	39.1	−17.0
Labour	Kenneth Lindsay	2,769	13.1	New
Majority		1,842	8.7	N/A
Turnout		21,085	80.3	−3.2
Unionist gain from Liberal		Swing	+10.5	

General election 1924: Oxford
Party	Candidate	Votes	%	±%
Unionist	Robert Bourne	12,196	57.3	+9.5
Liberal	Robert Moon	6,836	32.1	−7.0
Labour	Frederic Ludlow	2,260	10.6	−2.5
Majority		5,360	25.2	N/A
Turnout		21,292	78.5	−1.8
Unionist gain from Liberal		Swing		

General election 1929: Oxford
Party	Candidate	Votes	%	±%
Unionist	Robert Bourne	14,638	52.5	−4.8
Liberal	Robert Moon	8,581	30.7	−1.4
Labour	John Lyttelton Etty	4,694	16.8	+6.2
Majority		6,057	21.8	−3.4
Turnout		27,913	72.2	−6.3
Unionist hold		Swing	-1.7	

=== Elections in the 1930s ===
General election 1931: Oxford
Party	Candidate	Votes	%	±%
Conservative	Robert Bourne	Unopposed	N/A	N/A
Conservative hold				

General election 1935: Oxford
Party	Candidate	Votes	%	±%
Conservative	Robert Bourne	16,306	62.8	N/A
Labour	Patrick Gordon-Walker	9,661	37.2	New
Majority		6,645	25.6	N/A
Turnout		25,967	67.3	N/A
Conservative hold		Swing		

1938 Oxford by-election
Party	Candidate	Votes	%	±%
Conservative	Quintin Hogg	15,797	56.1	−6.7
Independent Progressive	Sandie Lindsay	12,363	43.9	New
Majority		3,434	12.2	−13.4
Turnout		28,160	76.3	+9.0
Conservative hold		Swing	-6.7	

=== Elections in the 1940s ===
General Election 1939–40:

Another General Election was required to take place before the end of 1940. The political parties had been making preparations for an election to take place and by Autumn 1939, the following candidates had been selected;

- Conservative: Quintin Hogg
- Labour: Patrick Gordon-Walker
- Liberal: William Brown

General election 1945: Oxford
Party	Candidate	Votes	%	±%
Conservative	Quintin Hogg	14,314	45.3	−17.5
Labour	Frank Pakenham	11,451	36.2	−1.0
Liberal	Antony Charles Wynyard Norman	5,860	18.5	New
Majority		2,863	9.1	−16.5
Turnout		31,625	66.3	−1.0
Conservative hold		Swing	-8.3	

=== Elections in the 1950s ===
General election 1950: Oxford
Party	Candidate	Votes	%	±%
Conservative	Quintin Hogg	27,508	46.85	+1.55
Labour	Elizabeth Pakenham	23,902	40.71	+4.51
Liberal	Donald William Tweddle	6,807	11.59	−6.91
Communist	Ernest Keeling	494	0.84	New
Majority		3,606	6.14	−2.96
Turnout		58,711	84.89	
Conservative hold		Swing	-1.48	

1950 Oxford by-election
Party	Candidate	Votes	%	±%
Conservative	Lawrence Turner	27,583	57.50	+10.65
Labour	Sydney Kersland Lewis	20,385	42.50	+1.79
Majority		7,198	15.00	+8.86
Turnout		47,968		
Conservative hold		Swing	+4.33	

General election 1951: Oxford
Party	Candidate	Votes	%	±%
Conservative	Lawrence Turner	32,367	56.00	−1.50
Labour	George Elvin	25,427	44.00	+1.50
Majority		6,940	12.00	+5.86
Turnout		57,794	81.98	−2.91
Conservative hold		Swing	-1.50	

General election 1955: Oxford
Party	Candidate	Votes	%	±%
Conservative	Lawrence Turner	27,708	52.30	−3.70
Labour	George Elvin	19,930	37.62	−6.38
Liberal	Ivor Davies	5,336	10.07	New
Majority		7,778	14.68	+2.68
Turnout		52,974	78.22	−3.76
Conservative hold		Swing	+1.34	

General election 1959: Oxford
Party	Candidate	Votes	%	±%
Conservative	Montague Woodhouse	26,798	50.95	−1.35
Labour	Leslie N Anderton	18,310	34.81	−2.81
Liberal	Ivor Davies	7,491	14.24	+4.14
Majority		8,488	16.14	+1.46
Turnout		52,599	78.91	+0.69
Conservative hold		Swing	+0.73	

=== Elections in the 1960s ===
General election 1964: Oxford
Party	Candidate	Votes	%	±%
Conservative	Montague Woodhouse	22,212	42.89	−8.06
Labour	Evan Luard	20,783	40.13	+5.32
Liberal	Ivor Davies	8,797	16.99	+2.75
Majority		1,429	2.76	−13.38
Turnout		51,792	77.29	−1.63
Conservative hold		Swing	-6.69	

General election 1966: Oxford
Party	Candidate	Votes	%	±%
Labour	Evan Luard	24,412	46.45	+6.32
Conservative	Montague Woodhouse	21,987	41.84	−1.05
Liberal	Alexander Duncan Campbell Peterson	6,152	11.71	−5.28
Majority		2,425	4.61	N/A
Turnout		52,551	79.26	+1.97
Labour gain from Conservative		Swing	+3.67	

=== Elections in the 1970s ===
General election 1970: Oxford
Party	Candidate	Votes	%	±%
Conservative	Montague Woodhouse	24,873	46.96	+5.12
Labour	Evan Luard	22,989	43.40	−3.05
Liberal	Peter H Reeves	5,103	9.63	−2.08
Majority		1,884	3.56	N/A
Turnout		52,965	74.54	−4.72
Conservative gain from Labour		Swing	+4.08	

General election February 1974: Oxford
Party	Candidate	Votes	%	±%
Conservative	Montague Woodhouse	23,967	39.81	−7.15
Labour	Evan Luard	23,146	38.44	−4.96
Liberal	MS Butler	13,094	21.75	+12.12
Majority		821	1.37	−2.19
Turnout		60,204	78.55	+4.01
Conservative hold		Swing	-1.10	

General election October 1974: Oxford
Party	Candidate	Votes	%	±%
Labour	Evan Luard	23,359	42.71	+4.29
Conservative	Montague Woodhouse	22,323	40.82	+1.01
Liberal	MS Butler	8,374	15.31	−6.44
National Front	Ian Anderson	572	1.05	New
Independent	Bernice Olive Smith	64	0.12	New
Majority		1,036	1.89	N/A
Turnout		54,691	70.78	−7.77
Labour gain from Conservative		Swing	+1.64	

General election 1979: Oxford
Party	Candidate	Votes	%	±%
Conservative	John Patten	27,459	45.30	+4.48
Labour	Evan Luard	25,962	42.83	+0.12
Liberal	Dermot Roaf	6,234	10.28	−4.03
Oxford Ecological Movement	Anthony Cheke	887	1.46	New
Independent	Bernice Olive Smith	72	0.12	0.00
Majority		1,497	2.47	N/A
Turnout		60,610	74.18	+3.40
Conservative gain from Labour		Swing	+2.18	

== Sources ==
- Leigh Rayment's Historical List of MPs – Constituencies beginning with "O"
- Election results, 1951–1979
- Robert Beatson, A Chronological Register of Both Houses of Parliament (London: Longman, Hurst, Res & Orme, 1807)
- D. Brunton & D. H. Pennington, Members of the Long Parliament (London: George Allen & Unwin, 1954)
- Cobbett's Parliamentary history of England, from the Norman Conquest in 1066 to the year 1803 (London: Thomas Hansard, 1808)
- F W S Craig, British Parliamentary Election Results 1832–1885 (2nd edition, Aldershot: Parliamentary Research Services, 1989)
- Craig, F. W. S. (1983). British parliamentary election results 1918–1949 (3 ed.). Chichester: Parliamentary Research Services. ISBN 0-900178-06-X.
- Maija Jansson (ed.), Proceedings in Parliament, 1614 (House of Commons) (Philadelphia: American Philosophical Society, 1988)
- J. E. Neale, The Elizabethan House of Commons (London: Jonathan Cape, 1949)
