= Penderel Moon =

British administrator and writer (1905-1987)

Sir Penderel Moon OBE
- Born: Edward Penderel Moon; 13 November 1905; Mayfair, London, England
- Died: 1987
- Education: Winchester College; New College, Oxford; All Souls College, Oxford
- Occupations: Civil servant Writer
- Employer(s): Indian Civil Service; Bahawalpur State
- Notable work: Strangers in India; Divide and Quit
- Title: Finance Minister of Bahawalpur State; Chief Commissioner of Himachal Pradesh; Chief Commissioner of Manipur
- Awards: Officer of the Order of the British Empire; Knight Bachelor

Sir Edward Penderel Moon, OBE (1905–1987) was a British administrator in India and a writer. He served as a finance minister for the Bahawalpur State in the British Raj. After India's independence, he stayed on in India and worked as the chief commissioner of Himachal Pradesh, as chief commissioner of Manipur state.

== Life and career ==
Moon was born 13 November 1905 in Mayfair, London to a cardiologist, Robert Oswald Moon who wrote about philosophy and Greek medicine as well as diseases of the heart. Dr Moon also stood several times as a Liberal candidate for parliament. He followed in his father's footsteps, first to Winchester College, then to New College, Oxford. In 1927, he was elected a prize fellow of All Souls College, Oxford. He joined the Indian Civil Service in 1929, being posted to the Punjab.

Yuan Yi Zhu wrote that "Moon spoke several Indian languages well enough to administer justice in the vernacular as a district officer in the Punjab", as required of officers in the Indian Civil Service.

Yuan wrote that "Moon was a sober observer of the British dominion in India. He thought it had done some good and some bad things, and that its eventual demise was long overdue." Yuan continued that after being "dismissed by the British government for being too sympathetic toward Indian nationalists" Moon "later spent 14 years holding important positions within the government of independent India at the invitation of its new rulers."

Moon wrote several books on British rule in India including Divide and Quit. Yuan described Moon's magnum opus as The British Conquest and Dominion of India (1989).

In a 2023 book review of David Veveer's book, The Great Defiance: How the World Took On the British Empire, Yuan criticised Veveer's depiction of Moon alongside "all the British villains in Veevers’ account". Yuan described Moon as "a mild-mannered colonial civil servant and historian", and states that Veveer condemned "Moon for committing “a gross erasure of the people of India from his story”, relying on a quotation which does not reflect what Moon actually wrote."

== Works ==
- Strangers in India (1944)
- The Future of India (1945)
- Warren Hastings and British India (1947)
- Divide and Quit (1961)
- Gandhi and Modern India (1968)
- Wavell: The Viceroy's Journal (editor, 1973)
- The British Conquest and Dominion of India: 1858-1947 (1989)
