= Robert Bourne (politician) =

British rower and politician

Robert Bourne J.P.

Deputy Chairman of Ways and Means
- In office 11 November 1931 – 7 August 1938
- Speaker: Edward Fitzroy
- Preceded by: Herbert Dunnico
- Succeeded by: Douglas Clifton Brown

Member of Parliament for Oxford
- In office 5 June 1924 – 7 August 1938
- Preceded by: Frank Gray
- Succeeded by: Quintin Hogg

Personal details
- Born: Robert Croft Bourne; 15 July 1888 Strontian, Argyll, UK
- Died: 7 August 1938 (aged 50)
- Party: Conservative
- Spouse: Hester Margaret Cairns (m. 1917)
- Children: Wilfrid Bourne
- Parent: Gilbert Charles Bourne (father)
- Education: Eton College
- Alma mater: New College, Oxford
- Sports career
- Years active: 1908–1914
- Sport: Rowing
- University team: Oxford University Boat Club
Medal record
Men's rowing
Representing Great Britain
| Silver medal – second place | 1912 Stockholm | Men's eight |

Robert Croft Bourne (15 July 1888 – 7 August 1938) was a British rower who competed in the 1912 Summer Olympics, and a Conservative Party politician who sat in the House of Commons from 1924 to 1938.

== Early life ==
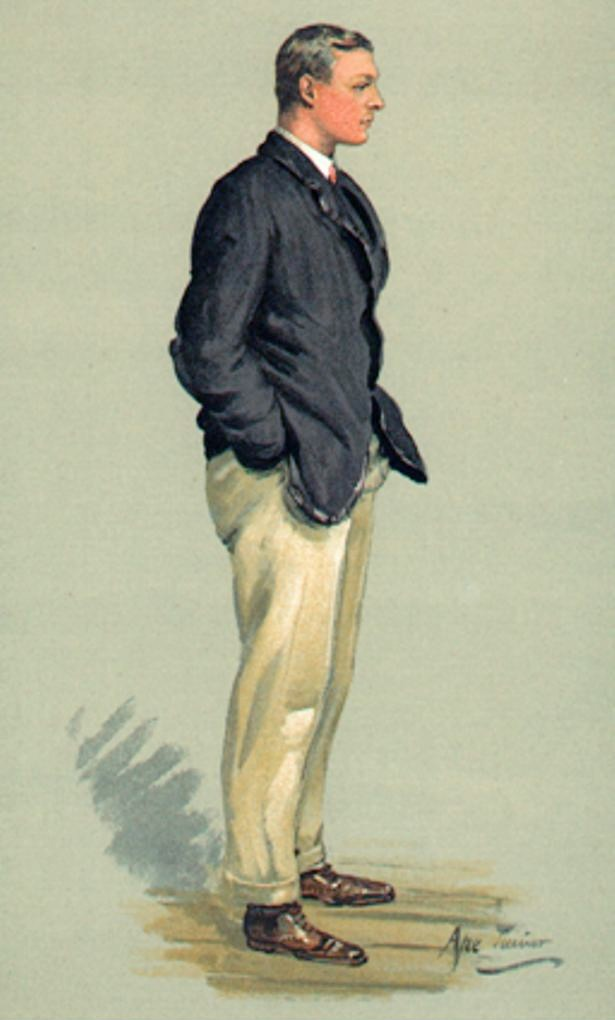
Robert Bourne – Vanity Fair caricature

Bourne was born at Bodington, London, the son of Gilbert Charles Bourne who had rowed in the winning Oxford crews in the Boat Race of 1882 and 1883. As a child, Bourne lost the sight of one eye in a game of rounders at school. He was educated at Eton College, where he won the School Sculling in 1906, and then at New College, Oxford. At Oxford, he stroked the winning Oxford boats in the Boat Race in 1909, 1910, 1911 and 1912, being president in the last two years. He also won the University Sculls in 1910 and the University Fours in 1911 and went head of the river in 1911–12. He was the strokeman of the New College eight which won the silver medal for Great Britain rowing at the 1912 Summer Olympics. He was a member of the winning crew in the Stewards' Challenge Cup at Henley Royal Regatta in 1912, 1913 and 1914.

Bourne became a barrister. In the First World War, he was commissioned as a second lieutenant in the Herefordshire Regiment. He had one hand crippled and a lung seriously injured at Suvla Bay in the Dardanelles in August 1915. As he had only one good eye, he was moved from active service to the Claims Commission. In 1920, he became J.P. for Herefordshire and in 1921, a member of the city council.

== Political career ==
Bourne was elected Conservative Member of Parliament (MP) for Oxford at a by-election in June 1924, and served as a Deputy Speaker of the Commons from 1931. He died in office in August 1938, aged 50, suddenly dropping dead while walking on the moors near Strontian, Argyll.

At the subsequent by-election the seat was held for the Conservatives by Quintin Hogg.

== Personal life ==
Bourne married Lady Hester Margaret Cairns, daughter of Wilfred Cairns, 4th Earl Cairns, on 7 June 1917. Their children included the lawyer and civil servant Sir Wilfrid Bourne.

== See also ==
- List of Oxford University Boat Race crews

Parliament of the United Kingdom
| Preceded by Frank Gray | Member of Parliament for Oxford; 1924 – 1938 | Succeeded by Quintin Hogg |
Political offices
| Preceded by Herbert Dunnico | Deputy Chairman of Ways and Means; 1931–1938 | Succeeded by Douglas Clifton Brown |
