= John Ludlow (MP) =

Member of the Parliament of England

John Ludlow (fl. 1395) of Oxford was an English Member of Parliament for Oxford in 1395.
