= List of Privy Counsellors (1837–1901) =

This is a list of privy counsellors of the United Kingdom appointed during the reign of Queen Victoria, from 1837 to 1901.

== Victoria ==
=== 1837 ===
- The Earl of Ilchester (1787–1858)
- The Earl of Surrey (1791–1856)

=== 1838 ===
- Stephen Lushington (1782–1873)

=== 1839 ===
- Viscount Ebrington (1783–1861)
- Sir George Grey, Bt (1799–1882)
- The Earl of Uxbridge (1797–1869)
- Charles Shaw-Lefevre (1794–1888)
- Sir Charles Metcalfe, Bt (1785–1846)
- Francis Baring (1796–1866)
- Richard Lalor Sheil (1791–1851)
- Thomas Babington Macaulay (1800–1859)

=== 1840 ===
- The Earl of Clarendon (1800–1870)
- The Lord Kinnaird (1807–1878)
- Prince Albert of Saxe-Coburg and Gotha (1819–1861)

=== 1841 ===
- Sir Joseph Littledale (1767–1842)
- Lord Marcus Hill (1798–1863)
- The Lord Campbell (1779–1861)
- The Hon. Fox Maule (1801–1874)
- The Hon. Edward Stanley (1802–1869)
- Robert Vernon Smith (1800–1873)
- The Duke of Buckingham and Chandos (1797–1861)
- The Earl of Liverpool (1784–1851)
- Lord Eliot (1798–1877)
- Lord Ernest Bruce (1811–1886)
- The Earl of Lincoln (1811–1864)
- William Ewart Gladstone (1809–1898)
- The Marquess of Exeter (1795–1867)
- The Marquess of Lothian (1794–1841)
- The Earl De La Warr (1791–1869)
- The Earl of Rosslyn (1802–1866)
- The Lord Forester (1801–1874)
- The Hon. George Dawson-Damer (1788–1856)
- John Nicholl (1797–1853)
- Earl Jermyn (1800–1864)

=== 1842 ===
- The Earl of Beverley (1778–1867)
- James Knight-Bruce (1791–1866)
- James Wigram (1793–1866)
- The Duke of Buccleuch (1806–1884)

=== 1843 ===
- Sir Edward Ryan (1793–1875)
- Thomas Pemberton Leigh (1793–1867)
- The Earl of Dalhousie (1812–1860)
- Richard Pakenham (1797–1868)

=== 1844 ===
- Sir Frederick Pollock (1783–1870)
- John Hope (1794–1858)
- Sir Thomas Fremantle, Bt (1798–1890)
- Sir Henry Pottinger, Bt (1789–1856)

=== 1845 ===
- Sidney Herbert (1810–1861)
- Sir George Clerk, Bt (1787–1867)
- The Hon. Bingham Baring (1799–1864)
- Henry Bulwer (1801–1872)

=== 1846 ===
- The Hon. James Stuart-Wortley (1805–1881)
- The Marquess of Abercorn (1811–1885)
- The Viscount Canning (1812–1862)
- The Duke of Bedford (1788–1861)
- Charles Wood (1800–1885)
- The Earl Spencer (1798–1857)
- Lord Edward Howard (1818–1883)
- Thomas Milner Gibson (1806–1884)
- The Earl Granville (1815–1891)
- Sir Thomas Wilde (1782–1855)
- Edward Strutt (1801–1880)

=== 1847 ===
- Sir George Arthur, Bt (1784–1854)
- The Hon. William Lascelles (1798–1851)
- Sir William Somerville, Bt (1802–1873)
- James Stephen (1789–1859)
- Richard More O'Ferrall (1797–1880)

=== 1848 ===
- Thomas Musgrave (1788–1860)
- William Hayter (1792–1878)
- John Bird Sumner (1780–1862)
- The Earl of Bessborough (1809–1880)
- Samuel March Phillipps (1780–1862)
- The Marquess of Breadalbane (1796–1862)

=== 1849 ===
- Thomas Wyse (1791–1862)
- Sir David Dundas (1803–1877)
- Matthew Talbot Baines (1799–1860)

=== 1850 ===
- The Marquess of Westminster (1795–1869)
- Henry Tufnell (1805–1854)
- Sir John Jervis (1802–1856)
- Sir Robert Rolfe (1790–1868)

=== 1851 ===
- Sir John Romilly (1802–1874)
- Sir George James Turner (1798–1867)
- Andrew Rutherfurd (1791–1854)
- The Earl of Mulgrave (1819–1890)
- Laurence Sulivan (1783–1866)
- Lord Seymour (1804–1885)

=== 1852 ===
- Sir John Patteson (1790–1861)
- The Lord Cowley (1804–1884)
- The Duke of Northumberland (1792–1865)
- The Earl of Sandwich (1811–1884)
- The Earl of Eglinton (1812–1861)
- The Earl of Hardwicke (1799–1873)
- The Earl of Malmesbury (1807–1889)
- Lord John Manners (1818–1906)
- The Lord de Ros (1797–1874)
- The Lord Colchester (1798–1867)
- The Hon. George Weld-Forester (1807–1886)
- Sir John Pakington, Bt (1799–1880)
- Spencer Horatio Walpole (1806–1898)
- Benjamin Disraeli (1804–1881)
- J. W. Henley (1793–1884)
- Robert Christopher (1804–1877)
- William Beresford (1797–1883)
- Lord Claud Hamilton (1813–1884)
- George Bankes (1788–1856)
- Viscount Newport (1819–1898)
- Sir John Trollope, Bt (1800–1874)
- Sir John Dodson (1780–1858)
- Lord Naas (1822–1872)
- The Lord Raglan (1788–1855)
- Sir John Young, Bt (1807–1876)
- Sir William Molesworth, Bt (1810–1855)
- Edward Cardwell (1813–1886)

=== 1853 ===
- The Viscount Sydney (1805–1890)
- The Duke of Argyll (1823–1900)
- The Duke of Wellington (1807–1884)
- Viscount Drumlanrig (1818–1858)
- The Hon. Charles Pelham Villiers (1802–1898)
- Duncan McNeill (1793–1874)
- John Parker (1799–1881)

=== 1854 ===
- Henry Addington (1790–1870)
- Sir Robert Inglis, Bt (1786–1855)
- Sir Benjamin Hall, Bt (1802–1867)

=== 1855 ===
- The Hon. Henry FitzRoy (1807–1859)
- Sir George Cornewall Lewis, Bt (1806–1863)
- Edward Horsman (1807–1876)
- The Hon. Edward Pleydell-Bouverie (1818–1889)
- The Earl of Harrowby (1798–1882)
- Sir William Henry Maule (1799–1858)
- The Hon. William Cowper (1811–1888)
- Sir Maurice Berkeley (1788–1867)
- Robert Lowe (1811–1892)
- William Monsell (1812–1894)
- Sir Hamilton Seymour (1797–1880)

=== 1856 ===
- Sir Lawrence Peel (1799–1884)
- Prince George, Duke of Cambridge (1819–1904)
- Archibald Campbell Tait (1811–1882)

=== 1857 ===
- Sir Alexander Cockburn (1802–1880)
- Viscount Castlerosse (1825–1905)
- The Earl of Elgin (1811–1863)
- Evelyn Denison (1800–1873)
- Sir John McNeill (1795–1883)
- Frederick Peel (1823–1906)
- Henry Herbert (1815–1866)
- Sir Edmund Head, Bt (1805–1868)

=== 1858 ===
- Sir Cresswell Cresswell (1794–1863)
- The Duke of Beaufort (1824–1899)
- Lord Stanley (1826–1893)
- The Lord Chelmsford (1794–1878)
- The Earl Talbot (1803–1868)
- T. H. S. Sotheron-Estcourt (1801–1876)
- Charles Adderley (1814–1905)
- Jonathan Peel (1799–1879)
- The Earl of Donoughmore (1823–1866)
- John Mowbray (1815–1899)
- Sir Edward Bulwer-Lytton, Bt (1803–1873)
- Sir John Taylor Coleridge (1790–1876)

=== 1859 ===
- John Inglis (1810–1891)
- The Earl of March (1818–1903)
- Lord Lovaine (1810–1899)
- Sir John Lawrence, Bt (1811–1879)
- The Viscount Gough (1779–1869)
- The Marquess of Ailesbury (1804–1878)
- Sir William Jolliffe, Bt (1800–1876)
- James Wilson (1805–1860)
- Thomas Emerson Headlam (1813–1875)
- The Earl Spencer (1835–1910)
- The Earl of Ducie (1827–1921)
- Viscount Bury (1832–1894)
- Lord Proby (1824–1872)
- Sir William Erle (1793–1880)
- Sir James Colvile (1810–1880)

=== 1860 ===
- William Hutt (1801–1882)
- Charles Longley (1794–1868)
- The Lord Bloomfield (1802–1879)

=== 1861 ===
- The Lord Napier (1819–1898)
- Sir Richard Bethell (1800–1873)
- Sir Robert Peel, Bt (1822–1895)

=== 1863 ===
- William Thomson (1819–1890)
- Sir Andrew Buchanan, Bt (1807–1882)
- The Earl de Grey and Ripon (1827–1909)
- Albert Edward, Prince of Wales (1841–1910)
- Sir William Gibson-Craig, Bt (1797–1878)

=== 1864 ===
- Chichester Fortescue (1823–1898)
- Sir James Wilde (1816–1899)
- Henry Bruce (1815–1895)
- The Lord Wodehouse (1826–1902)

=== 1865 ===
- William Massey (1809–1881)
- The Lord Lyons (1817–1887)
- Sir Edward Vaughan Williams (1797–1875)
- George Goschen (1831–1907)

=== 1866 ===
- The Marquess of Hartington (1833–1908)
- The Earl of Cork (1829–1904)
- Lord Clarence Paget (1811–1895)
- Prince Alfred, Duke of Edinburgh (1844–1900)
- Lord Otho FitzGerald (1827–1882)
- Edmund Hammond (1802–1890)
- Russell Gurney (1804–1878)
- Horatio Waddington (1799–1867)
- The Duke of Buckingham and Chandos (1823–1889)
- The Earl of Carnarvon (1831–1890)
- Viscount Cranborne (1830–1903)
- Sir Stafford Northcote, Bt (1818–1887)
- Gathorne Hardy (1814–1906)
- Henry Brand (1814–1892)
- The Duke of Marlborough (1822–1883)
- The Earl of Devon (1807–1888)
- The Earl of Tankerville (1810–1899)
- The Earl Cadogan (1812–1873)
- Lord Burghley (1825–1895)
- Viscount Royston (1836–1897)
- The Lord Colville of Culross (1818–1903)
- Stephen Cave (1820–1880)
- Henry Baillie (1803–1885)
- Sir Fitzroy Kelly (1796–1880)
- Sir Hugh Cairns (1819–1885)
- Sir Richard Kindersley (1792–1879)
- Sir Henry Storks (1811–1874)
- Sir William Bovill (1814–1873)
- William Vesey-FitzGerald (1818–1885)

=== 1867 ===
- Lord Robert Montagu (1825–1902)
- The Hon. Percy Herbert (1822–1876)
- John Wilson-Patten (1802–1892)
- Sir John Rolt (1804–1871)
- Sir Robert Phillimore (1810–1885)
- The Hon. Henry Elliot (1817–1907)
- George Patton (1803–1869)
- Sir Francis Head, Bt (1793–1875)

=== 1868 ===
- George Ward Hunt (1825–1877)
- Sir William Wood (1801–1881)
- Sir Charles Jasper Selwyn (1813–1869)
- Thomas Edward Taylor (1811–1883)
- Lord Augustus Loftus (1817–1904)
- Sir Joseph Napier, Bt (1804–1882)
- Sir James Fergusson, Bt (1832–1907)
- John Bright (1811–1889)
- Hugh Childers (1827–1896)
- Austen Henry Layard (1817–1894)
- William Edward Forster (1818–1886)
- Sir Colman O'Loghlen, Bt (1819–1877)
- The Lord Dufferin and Clandeboye (1826–1902)

=== 1869 ===
- The Lord de Tabley (1811–1887)
- Sir George Giffard (1813–1870)
- James Stansfeld (1820–1898)
- The Duke of St Albans (1840–1898)
- The Lord Lyttelton (1817–1876)
- John Jackson (1811–1885)
- The Viscount Monck (1819–1894)
- The Lord Northbrook (1826–1904)
- George Hamilton (1802–1871)
- James Moncreiff (1811–1895)
- Sir Alexander Spearman, Bt (1793–1874)
- Acton Smee Ayrton (1816–1886)

=== 1870 ===
- James Lawson (1817–1887)
- Sir William Milbourne James (1807–1881)
- Sir Barnes Peacock (1805–1890)
- Sir William Heathcote, Bt (1801–1881)
- Sir George Mellish (1814–1877)

=== 1871 ===
- John Davison (1825–1871)
- Sir John Macpherson Macleod (1792–1881)
- Sir John Stuart (1793–1876)
- Prince Arthur (1850–1942)
- The Earl Cowper (1834–1905)
- Sir Frederick Rogers, Bt (1811–1889)
- Mountague Bernard (1820–1882)
- Sir Edward Thornton (1817–1906)
- Sir James Shaw Willes (1814–1872)
- Sir Montague Smith (1809–1891)
- Sir Edward Lugard (1810–1898)
- Sir Robert Collier (1817–1886)

=== 1872 ===
- Sir James Hogg, Bt (1790–1876)
- Odo Russell (1829–1884)
- Lord Richard Grosvenor (1837–1912)
- The Lord Poltimore (1837–1908)
- Sir William Knollys (1797–1883)
- John Dodson (1825–1897)
- George Young (1819–1907)
- Sir Roundell Palmer (1812–1895)
- Peter Erle (1795–1877)
- Sir James Hannen (1821–1894)

=== 1873 ===
- Sir John Barnard Byles (1801–1884)
- William Edward Baxter (1825–1890)
- Edward Knatchbull-Hugessen (1829–1893)
- The Lord Wolverton (1824–1887)
- Sir Henry Bartle Frere (1815–1884)
- William Patrick Adam (1823–1881)
- Sir George Jessel (1824–1883)
- Sir John Coleridge (1820–1894)
- Lyon Playfair (1818–1898)

=== 1874 ===
- The Lord Monson (1829–1898)
- Sir Samuel Martin (1801–1883)
- The Earl of Ilchester (1847–1905)
- R. A. Cross (1823–1914)
- The Marquess of Hertford (1812–1884)
- Earl Percy (1846–1918)
- The Earl Beauchamp (1830–1891)
- Lord Henry Somerset (1849–1932)
- The Viscount Barrington (1824–1886)
- Viscount Sandon (1831–1900)
- The Lord Skelmersdale (1837–1898)
- Sir Michael Hicks Beach, Bt (1837–1916)
- Sir John Dalrymple-Hay, Bt (1821–1912)
- George Sclater-Booth (1826–1894)
- Edward Gordon (1814–1879)
- The Hon. Gerard Noel (1823–1911)
- Lord Henry Lennox (1821–1886)
- John Hubbard (1805–1889)
- Prince Leopold (1853–1884)

=== 1875 ===
- The Earl of Shrewsbury (1830–1877)
- Sir Henry Keating (1804–1888)
- The Marquess of Lorne (1845–1914)
- The Hon. Sir Charles Murray (1806–1895)
- Sir Richard Baggallay (1816–1888)
- Sir Richard Couch (1817–1905)
- George Cavendish-Bentinck (1821–1891)

=== 1876 ===
- Lord Henry Thynne (1832–1904)
- Sir John Karslake (1821–1881)
- Sir Augustus Paget (1823–1896)
- Lord Blackburn (1813–1896)
- Sir Henry Montgomery, Bt. (1803–1878)
- Sir George Bramwell (1808–1892)
- Sir William Brett (1815–1899)
- Sir Richard Amphlett (1809–1883)

=== 1877 ===
- Henry Cotton (1821–1892)
- The Earl of Coventry (1838–1930)
- William Henry Smith (1825–1891)
- The Hon. Alfred Thesiger (1838–1880)
- Sir Thomas Myddelton Biddulph (1809–1878)

=== 1878 ===
- James Lowther (1840–1904)
- The Duke of Devonshire (1808–1891)
- William Watson (1827–1899)
- The Hon. Frederick Stanley (1841–1908)
- Lord George Hamilton (1845–1927)
- John Arthur Roebuck (1801–1879)

=== 1879 ===
- The Earl of Yarmouth (1843–1912)
- The Earl of Mount Edgcumbe (1833–1917)
- Sir Robert Lush (1807–1881)
- Sir John Mellor (1809–1887)
- Sir John Macdonald (1815–1891)

=== 1880 ===
- The Lord Aveland (1830–1910)
- Henry Cecil Raikes (1838–1891)
- The Hon. David Plunket (1838–1919)
- George Cubitt (1828–1917)
- The Hon. Robert Bourke (1827–1902)
- Sir William Hart Dyke, Bt (1837–1931)
- Sir Henry Ponsonby (1825–1895)
- Alexander Beresford Hope (1820–1887)
- The Duke of Westminster (1825–1899)
- Sir William Harcourt (1827–1904)
- The Earl of Breadalbane (1851–1922)
- The Earl Fife (1849–1912)
- Lord Charles Bruce (1834–1897)
- The Lord Kensington (1835–1896)
- Joseph Chamberlain (1836–1914)
- A. J. Mundella (1825–1897)
- Henry Fawcett (1833–1884)
- George Osborne Morgan (1826–1897)
- M. E. Grant Duff (1829–1906)
- George Shaw-Lefevre (1831–1928)

=== 1881 ===
- The Marquess of Huntly (1847–1937)
- Sir Arthur Hobhouse (1819–1904)
- Sir Richard Malins (1805–1882)
- The Lord Carrington (1843–1928)
- The Earl of Rosebery (1847–1929)
- Sir Nathaniel Lindley (1828–1921)

=== 1882 ===
- Sir John Holker (1828–1882)
- The Lord FitzGerald (1816–1889)
- Sir Charles Bowen (1835–1894)
- George Trevelyan (1838–1928)
- Sir Charles Dilke, Bt (1843–1911)

=== 1883 ===
- Edward White Benson (1829–1896)
- Sir Edward Fry (1827–1918)
- Sir Hercules Robinson (1824–1897)
- Sir Louis Mallet (1823–1890)
- Sir Thomas Acland, Bt (1809–1898)
- John Balfour (1837–1905)
- Sir John Lumley (1818–1896)

=== 1884 ===
- Arthur Peel (1829–1912)
- Sir Erskine May (1815–1886)
- Sir Astley Key (1821–1888)
- Henry Campbell-Bannerman (1836–1908)

=== 1885 ===
- Sir Robert Morier (1826–1893)
- Sir Edward Malet (1837–1908)
- Frederick Temple (1821–1902)
- Sir John Lambert (1815–1892)
- Sir Henry James (1828–1911)
- Lord Randolph Churchill (1849–1895)
- The Hon. Edward Stanhope (1840–1893)
- Sir Henry Selwin-Ibbetson, Bt (1826–1902)
- Sir Henry Drummond Wolff (1830–1908)
- Sir Hardinge Giffard (1823–1921)
- Henry Chaplin (1840–1923)
- Arthur Balfour (1848–1930)
- Edward Gibson (1837–1913)
- The Marquess of Waterford (1844–1895)
- The Earl Cadogan (1840–1915)
- Lord Arthur Hill (1846–1931)
- Viscount Folkestone (1841–1900)
- Viscount Lewisham (1851–1936)
- Sir Arthur Otway, Bt (1822–1912)
- William Marriott (1834–1903)
- Sir Massey Lopes, Bt (1818–1908)
- Sir Harry Verney, Bt (1801–1894)
- Sir Francis Sandford (1824–1893)
- John Macdonald (1836–1919)
- Sir Henry Holland, Bt (1825–1914)
- Sir Henry Lopes (1828–1899)
- Stephen Flanagan (1817–1891)

=== 1886 ===
- The Marquess of Lothian (1833–1900)
- Sir Charles Wyke (1815–1897)
- Charles Newdegate (1816–1887)
- The Earl of Aberdeen (1847–1934)
- Sir Farrer Herschell (1837–1899)
- John Morley (1838–1923)
- Edward Heneage (1840–1922)
- The Lord Sudeley (1840–1922)
- The Hon. Edward Marjoribanks (1849–1909)
- The Earl of Elgin (1849–1917)
- The Earl of Morley (1843–1905)
- Viscount Kilcoursie (1839–1900)
- The Lord Suffield (1830–1914)
- J. T. Hibbert (1824–1908)
- John William Mellor (1835–1911)
- The Earl of Dalhousie (1847–1887)
- The Lord Thurlow (1838–1916)
- John North (1804–1894)
- Sir Ughtred Kay-Shuttleworth, Bt (1844–1939)
- Henry Fowler (1830–1911)
- Sir John Rose, Bt (1820–1888)
- Sir John Drummond-Hay (1816–1893)
- The Marquess of Londonderry (1852–1915)
- Henry Matthews (1826–1913)
- Charles Ritchie (1838–1906)
- The Duke of Portland (1857–1943)
- The Earl of Kintore (1852–1930)
- The Earl of Rosslyn (1833–1890)
- Sir James Bacon (1798–1895)
- Sir George Bowen (1821–1899)

=== 1887 ===
- Edward Macnaghten (1830–1913)
- The Earl Brownlow (1844–1921)
- Sir John Cowell (1832–1894)
- Sir William Grove (1811–1896)
- William Bede Dalley (1831–1888)

=== 1888 ===
- Sir Richard Garth (1820–1903)
- The Earl of Lytton (1831–1891)
- Sir William White (1824–1891)
- Sir Clare Ford (1828–1899)
- James Robertson (1845–1909)

=== 1889 ===
- The Earl of Limerick (1840–1896)
- Leonard Courtney (1832–1918)
- Baron Henry de Worms (1840–1903)
- The Earl of Zetland (1844–1929)
- Sir James Caird (1816–1892)
- The Lord Morris (1826–1901)

=== 1890 ===
- Sir John Lubbock, Bt (1834–1913)
- Sir John Eldon Gorst (1835–1916)
- Sir William Field (1813–1907)
- The Earl of Jersey (1845–1915)
- William Jackson (1840–1917)
- Lord Shand (1828–1904)
- The Earl of Yarborough (1859–1936)
- Sir Edward Kay (1822–1897)

=== 1891 ===
- William Connor Magee (1821–1891)
- The Lord Windsor (1857–1923)
- Sir Charles Butt (1830–1892)
- The Hon. Evelyn Ashley (1836–1907)
- Aretas Akers-Douglas (1851–1926)
- William Lidderdale (1832–1902)
- William Maclagan (1826–1910)
- Lord Walter Gordon-Lennox (1865–1922)
- Sir Charles Pearson (1843–1910)
- Lord Burghley (1849–1898)

=== 1892 ===
- Sir Walter Barttelot, Bt (1820–1893)
- Arthur Forwood (1836–1898)
- The Lord Balfour of Burleigh (1849–1921)
- Sir Francis Jeune (1843–1905)
- Sir Archibald Levin Smith (1836–1901)
- Sir James Parker Deane (1812–1902)
- The Lord Houghton (1858–1945)
- Arnold Morley (1849–1916)
- H. H. Asquith (1852–1928)
- Arthur Acland (1847–1926)
- James Bryce (1838–1922)
- Sir Matthew Ridley, Bt (1842–1904)
- Jesse Collings (1831–1920)
- Thomas Henry Huxley (1825–1895)
- Robert Duff (1835–1895)
- The Hon. Charles Spencer (1857–1922)
- Herbert Gardner (1846–1921)
- Charles Seale-Hayne (1833–1903)
- The Lord Vernon (1854–1898)
- The Lord Ribblesdale (1854–1925)
- Christopher Palles (1831–1920)
- Alexander Hill (1825–1905)

=== 1893 ===
- George Denman (1819–1896)
- Sir Alfred Stephen (1802–1894)
- The Lord Vivian (1834–1893)
- The Hon. Sir Edmund Monson (1834–1909)
- Sir Horace Davey (1833–1907)

=== 1894 ===
- Sir Philip Currie (1834–1906)
- Sir Algernon West (1832–1921)
- Herbert Gladstone (1854–1930)
- The Earl of Chesterfield (1854–1933)
- Sir Charles Russell (1832–1900)
- Sir George Grey (1812–1898)
- Sir Frank Lascelles (1841–1920)
- Sir Arthur Hayter, Bt (1835–1917)
- Jacob Bright (1821–1899)
- Prince George, Duke of York (1865–1936)
- Prince Christian of Schleswig-Holstein (1831–1917)
- Prince Henry of Battenberg (1858–1896)
- Sir John Rigby (1834–1903)
- Sir Julian Pauncefote (1828–1902)
- Sir John Thompson (1844–1894)

=== 1895 ===
- Cecil Rhodes (1853–1902)
- William Gully (1835–1909)
- The Lord Leigh (1824–1905)
- Sir Henry Loch (1827–1900)
- The Hon. George Curzon (1859–1925)
- Robert Hanbury (1845–1903)
- The Marquess of Lansdowne (1845–1927)
- Sir Bernard Samuelson, Bt (1820–1905)
- Sir Ralph Thompson (1830–1902)
- Walter Long (1854–1924)
- The Duke of Norfolk (1847–1917)
- The Earl of Pembroke (1853–1913)
- The Earl of Hopetoun (1860–1908)
- The Lord Belper (1840–1914)
- Sir Fleetwood Edwards (1842–1910)
- Sir Julian Goldsmid, Bt (1838–1896)
- Sir Richard Paget, Bt (1832–1908)
- Francis Foljambe (1830–1917)

=== 1896 ===
- Sir Richard Temple, Bt (1826–1902)
- Charles Stuart-Wortley (1851–1926)
- Sir Nicholas O'Conor (1843–1908)
- Max Müller (1823–1900)
- Andrew Murray (1849–1942)
- Sir Horace Rumbold, Bt (1829–1913)

=== 1897 ===
- Sir Joseph Chitty (1828–1899)
- The Hon. St John Brodrick (1856–1942)
- Sir John Kennaway, Bt (1837–1919)
- The Earl Waldegrave (1851–1930)
- Mandell Creighton (1843–1901)
- Samuel Way (1836–1916)
- Sir John de Villiers (1842–1914)
- Sir Samuel Henry Strong (1825–1909)
- Sir Wilfrid Laurier (1841–1919)
- George Reid (1845–1918)
- Sir George Turner (1851–1916)
- Richard Seddon (1845–1906)
- Sir Hugh Nelson (1833–1906)
- Sir Gordon Sprigg (1830–1913)
- Charles Kingston (1850–1908)
- Sir William Whiteway (1828–1908)
- Sir John Forrest (1847–1918)
- Sir Edward Braddon (1829–1904)
- Harry Escombe (1838–1899)
- William Edward Hartpole Lecky (1838–1903)
- John Talbot (1835–1910)
- John Wharton (1837–1912)
- Sir Herbert Maxwell, Bt (1845–1937)
- Sir Richard Collins (1842–1911)
- Sir Roland Vaughan Williams (1838–1916)

=== 1898 ===
- Sir George Goldie (1846–1925)
- James Alexander Campbell (1825–1908)
- James Lowther (1855–1949)
- Edmond Wodehouse (1835–1914)
- Sir Charles Scott (1838–1924)

=== 1899 ===
- The Duke of Marlborough (1871–1934)
- Sir Charles Hall (1843–1900)
- Edward Saunderson (1837–1906)
- William Kenrick (1831–1919)
- The Lord Brampton (1817–1907)
- Sir William Walrond, Bt (1849–1925)
- Sir Robert Romer (1840–1918)

=== 1900 ===
- The Lord Rowton (1838–1903)
- Bramston Beach (1826–1901)
- Sir Ford North (1830–1913)
- Sir Richard Webster, Bt (1842–1915)
- Sir Frederick Milner, Bt (1849–1931)
- The Viscount Cromer (1841–1917)
- The Earl of Clarendon (1846–1914)
- The Earl of Selborne (1859–1942)
- Gerald Balfour (1853–1945)
- Joseph Powell-Williams (1840–1904)
- Gerald FitzGibbon (1837–1909)
- Sir James Stirling (1836–1916)
- William Ellison-Macartney (1852–1924)
