= Accent perception =

Judgments about a person based on their accent

Accents are the distinctive variations in the pronunciation of a language. They can be native or foreign, local or national and can provide information about a person’s geographical locality, socio-economic status and ethnicity. The perception of accents is normal within any given group of language users and involves the categorisation of speakers into social groups and entails judgments about the accented speaker, including their status and personality. Thus, accent perception is deeply tied to language ideologies. Accents can significantly alter the perception of an individual or an entire group, which is an important fact considering that the frequency that people with different accents are encountering one another is increasing, partially due to inexpensive international travel and social media. As well as affecting judgments, accents also affect key cognitive processes (e.g., memory) that are involved in a myriad of daily activities. The development of accent perception occurs in early childhood. Consequently, from a young age accents influence our perception of other people, decisions we make about when and how to interact with others, and, in reciprocal fashion, how other people perceive us.

== Social identity theory of accents ==
Social identity theory is a theory that describes intergroup behaviour based on group membership. Markers of group membership can be arbitrary, e.g., coloured vests, a flip of a coin, etc., or non-arbitrary, e.g., gender, language, race, etc. Accent is a non-arbitrary marker for group membership that is potentially more salient than most other non-arbitrary markers such as race and visual cues in general. One component of social identity theory states that members of the same group will treat and judge other members of their group (in-group members) preferentially compared to those who are not in their group (out-group members). This phenomenon is called in-group bias and when applied to accents is called the own-accent bias. There are many examples of the discrimination of out-groups based on language, e.g., the banning of the public speaking of German in the United States during World War I and the Al-Anfal Campaign, however, there are also examples of discrimination based on accent. Some of these instances date back many several millennia, for example, in the Bible in Judges 12:5-6 the following quote depicting the mass-killing of a people based on their accent appears:

“The Gileadites captured the fords of the Jordan leading to Ephraim, and whenever a survivor of Ephraim said, “Let me cross over,” the men of Gilead asked him, “Are you an Ephraimite?” If he replied, “No,” they said, “All right, say ‘Shibboleth.’” If he said, “Sibboleth,” because he could not pronounce the word correctly, they seized him and killed him at the fords of the Jordan. Forty-two thousand Ephraimites were killed at that time.”

Whereas some are more recent, for example, in his play Pygmalion George Bernard Shaw famously recognised the disparities of accent (even in a native context) when he wrote:

“It is impossible for an Englishman to open his mouth without making some other Englishman hate or despise him”.

== Evolutionary underpinnings of the own-accent bias ==
Accents function as markers of social group membership broadcasting information about individuals' in-group/out-group status. However, unlike other seemingly more conspicuous non-arbitrary markers (e.g., race), the accent an individual has is not outwardly obvious to a casual observer unless the individual speaks and is within hearing range of the observer. This raises the question of how such an easily hidden characteristic became a marker of group membership in the first place. One predominant account suggests an answer to this conundrum lies in evolutionary history. In modern societies people of many different racial backgrounds live together, which provides modern humans with the chance to experience a wide range of races and racial characteristics (e.g., different coloured skin). However, in early societies neighbouring communities could not travel far except by walking, thus they were likely to look similar. As such, a natural selection pressure may have existed that favoured social attention to accents, which functioned as an honesty signal (i.e., an honest signal of an individual's group membership), so individuals could easily identify in-group members from the potential threat of out-group members. In comparison, the selection pressure to socially attend to race was less relevant.

== Theories of own-accent bias ==
The own-accent bias is the inclination toward, and more positive judgement of, individuals with the same accent as yourself compared to those with a different accent. There are two main theories that attempt to explain this bias: affective processing and prototype representation.

=== Affective processing ===
The affective processing approach proposes that the positive-bias exhibited for others who speak with an own-accent is produced by a (potentially unconscious) emotional reaction. Put simply, people like others who have the same accent as themselves for that precise reason; they like it. This theory has developed, and draws support, from neuroscientific research investigating affective prosody (a key component underlying accent) and vocal emotion, which has found activation (predominantly in the right hemisphere) in important brain regions associated with the processing of emotion. These regions include:

- Mid and superior temporal gyri
- Insulae
- Inferior frontal gyrus
- Basal ganglia
- Amygdalae

Additional to the processing of memory and emotion, the amygdalae have important roles as “relevance detectors" for the discernment of relevant social information. Therefore, these brain regions that deal with social relevance and vocal emotion are probable candidates for a neural network concerning accent-based group membership that would drive the affective processing of accents.

=== Prototype representation ===
The prototype representation approach stems from theories developed in the linguistics and cognitive psychology domains. It proposes that there are “prototypes” (i.e., internal representations) stored in the brain, which incoming information from the senses is compared against to facilitate categorisation. Therefore, the own-accent bias is due to the fact that own-accents are similar to the prototype of "accent" hence are processed and categorised more easily than those other-accents that are dissimilar. This idea is supported by research showing that the further away a voice is from the average, (which is assumed to be a good representation of the internal prototype of accent) the more distinctive and less attractive it is rated, and the more activity is produced in the temporal voice areas (areas of the brain that deal with voice perception and accents).

== Research into accent perception ==
Recent research has investigated the effects of accent on earwitness memory (similar to eyewitness memory but based on what a person heard rather than saw). The study showed that ear-witnesses were more likely to mistake offenders with a different accent than an own-accent, and that their judgements were less confident in reporting other-accent offenders compared to those with their own-accent. The authors of the study present similarities between the own-accent bias and the own-race bias, which states that faces are more easily recognised by people of the same race (own-race) because those people have more experience (higher expertise) with them compared to faces of different races (other-race). This is similar to the prototype representation theory of the own-accent bias (see above). Another study investigated the effects of teacher-accent on student learning. This research found that students recalled more information from lectures with teachers who had their own-accent and rated the own-accent teachers more favourably compared to those with an other-accent. Additionally, research focussing on the development of the own-accent bias in infants and children has shown that children are not only consistently able to differentiate between foreign- and native-accents but that infants and children prefer individuals who have a native accent compared to a foreign one, leading them to change their behaviour based on a speakers accent (e.g., accepting a toy off a native-accented speaker rather than a foreign-accented speaker).

== See also ==
- Accent (sociolinguistics)
- Accent reduction
- Variety (linguistics)
- Regional accents of English
- Foreign accent syndrome
- Non-native pronunciations of English
- Anglophone pronunciation of foreign languages
- International Phonetic Alphabet chart for English dialects
- Human voice
