= Foreign accent =

Foreign accent may refer to:

- accent (sociolinguistics)
- diacritic, an accent mark in writing
- non-native pronunciations of English
- Anglophone pronunciation of foreign languages
- foreign accent syndrome
