= John Lockhart =

John Lockhart may refer to:

- John Lockhart-Ross (1721–1790), known as John Lockhart from 1721 to 1760, Royal Navy officer
- John Gibson Lockhart (1794–1854), Scottish writer and editor
- John Ingram Lockhart (1766–1835), British politician, also known as John Wastie
- John Ingram Lockhart (writer) (1812–1889), English translator and radical, nephew of the politician
- John Bruce Lockhart (1889–1956), Scottish cricketer and schoolmaster
- John Lockhart (judge) (1935–2006), Australian judge in the Federal Court of Australia
