= William Erle =

English lawyer, judge and Whig politician (1793–1880)

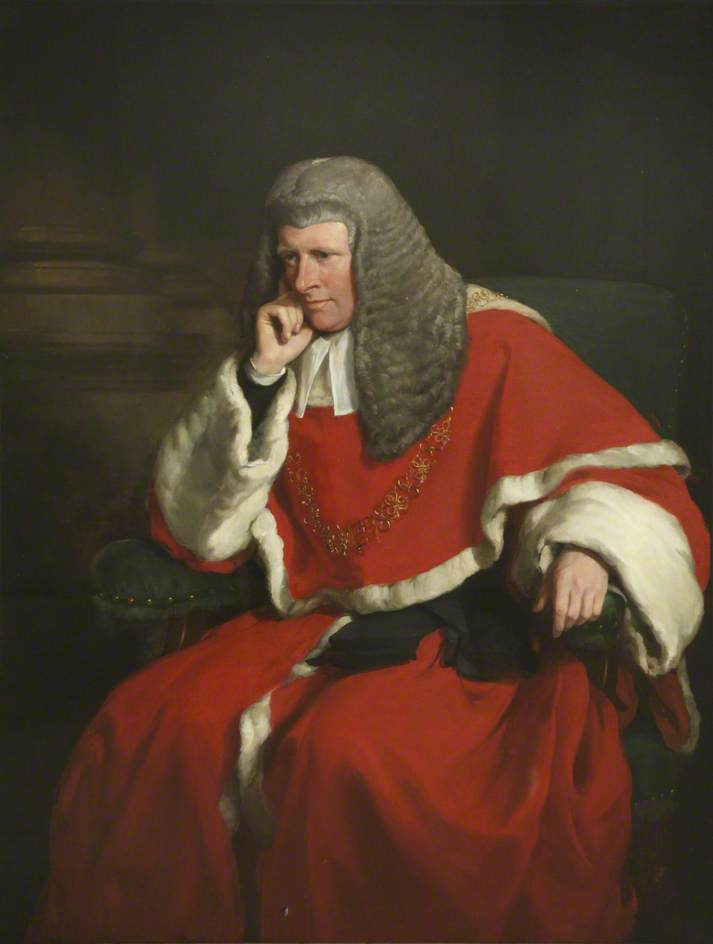
Sir William Erle, c. 1851 by Sir Francis Grant

Sir William Erle PC FRS (1 October 1793 – 28 January 1880) was an English lawyer, judge and Whig politician.

== Early career ==
Born at Fifehead Magdalen, Dorset, William was the son of the Rev. Christopher Erle of Gillingham, Dorset and Margaret née Bowles, a relative of the poet William Lisle Bowles. His younger brother Peter Erle went on to be a Charity Commissioner. Erle was educated at Winchester College and at New College, Oxford where he graduated BCL in 1818 and held a fellowship until 1834. Having been called to the Bar at the Middle Temple on 26 November 1819 he went on the Western Circuit. Here he slowly acquired a reputation for thoroughness, rather than brilliance, and a fair share of remunerative practice. He was admitted ad eundem a member of the Inner Temple on 11 June 1822, and became a bencher of that society on 18 November 1834, and in 1844, Treasurer. He also purchased a warrant as counsel at the Palace Court which had jurisdiction in all private law actions within 12 miles (19 km) of Whitehall.

In 1834, he married Amelia, eldest daughter of the Rev. David Williams, warden of New College and prebendary of Winchester, thereby vacating his fellowship. The same year he took silk. He sat in the Parliament of the United Kingdom from 1837 to 1841 for the City of Oxford but he never spoke in the house, voting steadily with his party. He was appointed counsel to the Bank of England in 1844 and did not seek re-election to parliament.

== Judge ==
Although of opposite politics to Lord Lyndhurst, Erle was made by him a judge of the Court of Common Pleas in 1845, becoming serjeant-at-law and being knighted. He was transferred to the Queen's Bench in the following year, and on 23 March 1849, at Brecon Lent Assizes tried the case of Moondyne Joe and an accomplice, charged with burglary and stealing. The pair pleaded not guilty but were convicted and Erle sentenced them to ten years' penal servitude. On 24 June 1859, Erle came back to the Common Pleas as Chief Justice upon the promotion of Sir Alexander Cockburn, at the same time being sworn to the Privy Council.

Erle was regarded as what lawyers call a "strong" judge in that he exhibited the power of rapidly grasping the material facts of a case, and coming to a decided conclusion upon their legal effect. He aimed at strict impartiality, but at the same time he was very tenacious of his own opinion. His chief characteristic was said to be "masculine sense" and his mind "lacking in flexibility and subtlety". His speech was deliberate, "even to monotony", and he had a faint regional accent. He decided a large number of important contract cases but is possibly best remembered for his judgments in the Swinfen will case, in particular Kennedy v. Broun (1863) in which he held that there could be no contract of hiring and service for advocacy in litigation.

He was a member of the Trades Union Commission of 1867, and appended to the report of the commissioners, published in 1868, a memorandum on the law relating to trades unions, which he published separately in the following year. It consists of two chapters treating respectively of the common and the statute law relating to the subject, and an appendix on certain leading cases and statutes. It was a very lucid exposition of the law as it then stood. Erle endorsed the minority report of the commission but it was his liberal view that ultimately influenced parliament and led to the Trade Union Act 1871.

He retired in 1866, receiving the highest praise for the ability and impartiality with which he had discharged the judicial office. On the last occasion of his sitting in court on 26 November the Attorney-General, Sir John Rolt, on behalf of the Bar, expressed his sense of the great qualities of which Erle had given proof during his tenure of office, in terms so eulogistic that the judge, though naturally somewhat reserved and undemonstrative, was visibly moved.

== Private life ==
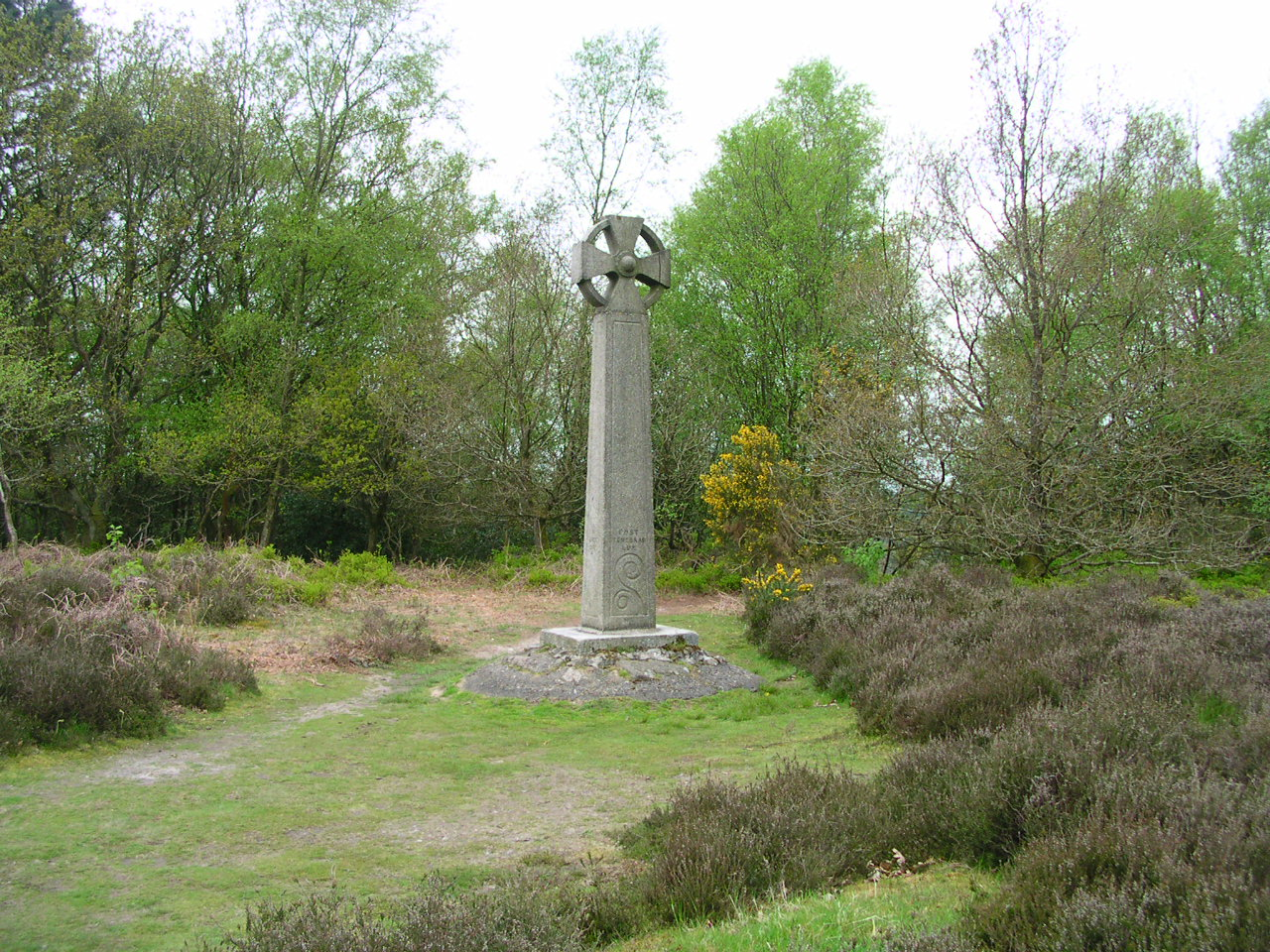
The Celtic cross on Gibbet Hill

During the rest of his life Erle resided chiefly at his modest seat, Bramshott, near Liphook, Hampshire, interesting himself in parochial and county affairs. Though no sportsman he was very fond of horses, dogs, and cattle. His personal appearance was that of a country gentleman, his complexion being said to be "remarkably fresh and ruddy, his eyes keen and bright."

In 1851, he erected a Celtic cross on Gibbet Hill, Hindhead on the former site of a public gibbet in order to dispel the fear of the residents. He died at his estate at Bramshott. He left no children.

== Honours ==
- Doctor of Civil Law, University of Oxford (1857);
- Fellow of the Royal Society (1860);
- Honorary Fellow, New College, Oxford.

== Notes ==
Parliament of the United Kingdom
Preceded by William Hughes Hughes	Member of Parliament for City of Oxford; 1837–1841; With: Donald Maclean	Succeeded by James Langston
Legal offices
Preceded by Sir Alexander Cockburn	Chief Justice of the Common Pleas; 1859–1866	Succeeded by Sir William Bovill
