= William Hughes Hughes (MP) =

British politician (1792–1874)

William Hughes Hughes (2 September 1792 – 10 October 1874) was a British politician.

Born in the Soho area of Westminster as William Hughes Hewitt, he qualified as a solicitor and in 1814 became a liveryman of the Worshipful Company of Cordwainers. He was admitted to Lincoln's Inn in 1821, the same year that his father died. His maternal grandfather died in 1825, and as principal beneficiary of his will, Hewitt became wealthy, inheriting around £85,000. In accordance with the terms of the will, he adopted his grandfather's surname, and thereafter referred to himself as Hughes Hughes. He was called as a barrister in 1827, although it is not clear whether he ever practised.

Hughes contested the Oxford constituency at the 1826 UK general election as a Whig. At the time, he strongly opposed Catholic emancipation, supported only gradual abolition of slavery, and called for changes to the Corn Laws, but not necessarily their abolition. He was expected to win a seat unopposed, but many electors noted his lack of connection with the seat, and persuaded John Ingram Lockhart to stand, Hughes ultimately finishing bottom of the poll. He stood again at the 1830 UK general election, and on this occasion was successful.

In 1832, Hughes stood in Portsoken to become an Alderman of the City of London. He lost the election but was seated after Michael Scales, the winner, was disqualified. Although he supported the Great Reform Act, he opposed the councillors' plan to ask the House of Commons to withhold supplies until the Act was passed, and he resigned soon after.

Hughes was defeated in the 1832 UK general election. However, in 1833 a by-election arose in the seat, which he won. He then became associated with the new Conservative Party, in which interest he held his seat in 1835, but was again defeated in the 1837 UK general election.

Hughes became master of the cordwainers, and in 1843 he was elected as an alderman in London again, this time for the Bread Street ward, serving for five years. He also served as a vice-president of the Royal Society of Arts, a magistrate in Hampshire, Middlesex and Westminster, and as a governor of Christ's Hospital. In 1834, he published a new edition of Jean-Louis de Lolme's Treatise on the Constitution of England. He was High Sheriff of Hampshire in 1843.

Hughes later moved to the Isle of Wight, then to Ilkley, where he died in 1872.

Parliament of the United Kingdom
Preceded by James Langston; John Ingram Lockhart	Member of Parliament for Oxford; 1830–1832; With: James Langston	Succeeded by James Langston; Thomas Stonor
Preceded by James Langston; Thomas Stonor	Member of Parliament for Oxford; 1833–1837; With: James Langston (1833–1835); Donald Maclean (1835–1837)	Succeeded by Donald Maclean; William Erle
