= Paul Meier (voice coach) =

British-American dialect and voice coach

Paul Meier (born February 17, 1947) is a British-American dialect and voice coach, theatre director, playwright, stage and screen actor, and voice-over artist best known for founding and managing Paul Meier Dialect Services and the International Dialects of English Archive (IDEA).

== Background and early career ==
Meier was born in Devizes, England, and grew up in London. He received an Honors in Phonetics and Dialects from Rose Bruford College of Theatre and Performance in London; a BA (Honors) in English and American Literature from the University of Kent at Canterbury, England; and a Certificate of Proficiency in Phonetics (first class) from the University of London. Meier has also authored books.

Before relocating permanently to the United States in 1978, Meier was a member of the BBC Drama Repertory Company, acting in more than 100 radio dramas alongside such colleagues as Richard Burton, Sir Derek Jacobi, Dame Flora Robson and Paul Scofield.

== Dialect, accent and voice work ==
Following many years of acting, teaching, and directing at a number of theaters and universities, such as the Royal Academy of Dramatic Arts (RADA), The London Academy of Music and Dramatic Art (LAMDA), Webber Douglas Academy of Dramatic Art, Austin Peay State University and the University of North Carolina School of the Arts, Meier turned most of his attention to the study and instruction of accents and dialects of the English language. In 1998, he founded Paul Meier Dialect Services and, three years later, published Accents & Dialects for Stage and Screen, a dialect-instruction textbook for actors, and his more specialized Dialects of the British Isles. In addition, Meier is the author and publisher of dozens of smaller books, CDs, and custom recordings of close to 200 plays and musicals. His dialect training is known for its seven-step method and proprietary "signature sounds".

Meier provides training for actors wishing to learn a dialect and ESL students wishing to reduce their foreign-language accents. He is currently professor emeritus of theatre at the University of Kansas. He has coached many feature films, including Oscar-winning director Ang Lee's Ride With the Devil, starring Tobey Maguire, Skeet Ulrich and Jewel Kilcher; Molokai: The Story of Father Damien, directed by Paul Cox and starring Peter O'Toole, Kris Kristofferson, Sam Neill and Tom Wilkinson; and Virginia, directed by Dustin Lance Black and starring Ed Harris and Jennifer Connelly.

Meier has been heard internationally in commercials for such clients as Ford, Coca-Cola, Sprint, Bayer and Walmart. He was the voice of the Walmart icon Smiley in 2003. He has also recorded numerous audiobooks, the most recent being Ayn Rand's Anthem.

== Shakespeare ==
Meier is a Shakespeare scholar, teacher and coach. His Voicing Shakespeare ebook addresses the linguistic challenges of Shakespearean language while explaining such terms as iambic pentameter, alexandrine, tetrameter, enjambment, trochee, spondee, pyrrhic and epic caesura. As a member of the BBC Drama Repertory Company, Meier acted in more than a dozen of Shakespeare's works.

In his teaching at universities and conservatories, and in his classes at the Shakespeare Centre in Stratford-upon-Avon in England, he has trained two generations of actors in Shakespeare's works.

Fusing his work with dialects and Shakespeare, Meier has contributed to the revival and study of Original Pronunciation (OP), the Early Modern English pronunciation of Shakespeare's day, and has contributed articles on the topic to scholarly journals such as the Cambridge Guide to the Worlds of Shakespeare. In November, 2010, he directed a University of Kansas production of A Midsummer Night's Dream spoken entirely in OP. With David Crystal supervising the dialect work, the play was produced for the stage, as a radio drama, and as a DVD. It was only the fifth fully produced OP Shakespeare production in living memory.

== International Dialects of English Archive (IDEA) ==
Meier created IDEA in 1998 as the first online archive of primary-source recordings of English dialects and accents from around the world. It has since become a tool of dialecticians, linguists and international business. Meier is its director and principal contributor.

== Links ==
- Meier’s dialect Website
- International Dialects of English Archive (IDEA)
- University of Kansas Theatre
- Paul Meier at IMDb
