= Pilcher v Rawlins =

English trusts law case

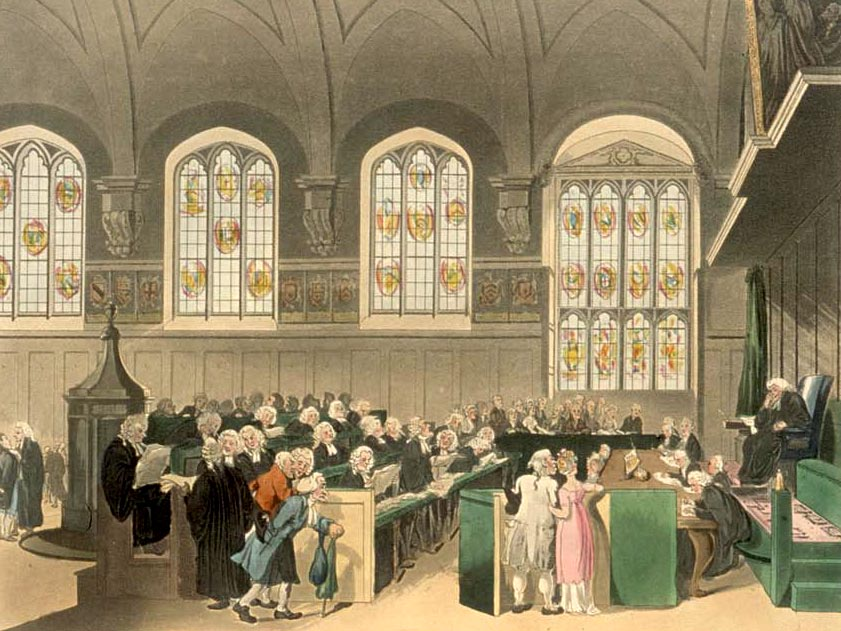
- Court of Chancery
- Court: Court of Appeal
- Decided: 29 January 1872
- Citation: (1871-72) LR 7 Ch App 259

Case history
- Appealed from: (1870) LR 11 Eq 53

Court membership
- Judges sitting: Lord Hatherly LC; James LJ; Mellish LJ

Keywords
- equity; trust; bona fide purchaser; fraud

Pilcher v Rawlins (1872) LR 7 Ch App 259 is a decision of the English Court of Appeal in relation to the rights of the beneficiaries under a trust against a bona fide third party purchaser for value of the trust property.

The Court of Appeal overruled the Master of the Rolls and held that the third party purchasers acquired legal title to the property free of the interests of the beneficiaries. It may be the earliest recorded case in English law where the court explicitly applied the rule that a bona fide purchaser for value without notice (or "equity's darling") takes free of any equitable interest in the property of which they were unaware, although even within the case report itself they refer to the principle as longstanding.

== Facts ==
In 1830 the settlor, Jeremiah Pilcher, transferred certain property to three trustees on trust for himself for life and then his children by his first marriage thereafter. In 1851 the trust loaned £8,373 to Robert Rawlins (a solicitor) on the strength of a mortgage granted by Rawlins over a property at Whitchurch, Hampshire. Under the law at the time, this involved Rawlins conveying title to the property to the trustees, subject to the proviso that they would transfer it back when the loan was repaid.

By 1856 two out of the three appointed trustees had died, and the sole remaining trustee was W.H. Pilcher. William Humphrey Pilcher and Rawlins "connived" (in the words of the Lord Chancellor) a scheme. William Humphrey Pilcher transferred title to the Whitchurch property back to Rawlins even though he had not repaid the loan. Rawlins then mortgaged the same property to the trustees of another trust: Stockwell and Lamb, conveying legal title to the land into their names in consideration of a loan of £10,000. Stockwell and Lamb were unaware of the prior mortgage and the rights of the first trust in favour of Jeremiah Pilcher and his children. William Humphrey Pilcher and Rawlins then split the £10,000 equally, and left the title to the land with Stockwell and Lamb.

When the fraud was uncovered, Jeremiah Pilcher and his children filed suit against W.H. Pilcher, Rawlins, Stockwell and Lamb. Stockwell and Lamb averred that they had good title to the land at Whitchurch as they were bona fide purchasers for value of a legal estate without notice.

The case came before the Master of the Rolls, Lord Romilly, at first instance, and he held that the 1851 mortgage prevailed and that Jeremiah Pilcher and his children were the beneficiaries of it, and Stockwell and Lamb's title to the land was subject to it. Stockwell and Lamb appealed.

== Court of Appeal ==
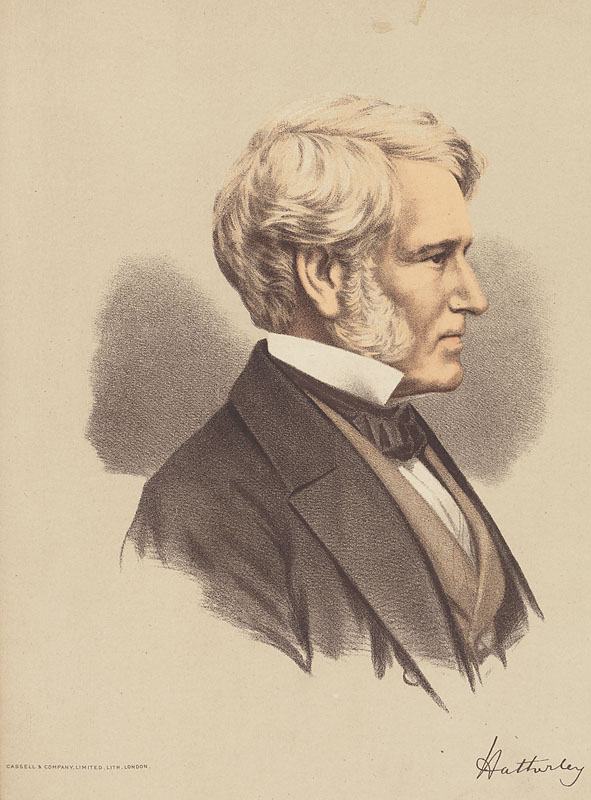
Lord Hatherley LC

The lead judgment was given by the Lord Chancellor, Lord Hatherley. He noted the difficulty of leaving property in the hands of those who had procured it by fraud. He reviewed the existing authorities on the subject critically, and expressly disapproved Carter v Carter (1857) 3 K&J 617, 69 ER 1256. He held there was nothing in the case to put Stockwell and Lamb of notice of the rights of the beneficiaries of the Pilcher trust. Held:

...it is immaterial whether the purchaser knows or not that another has an equitable interest prior to his own, provided that he did not know that fact upon paying his purchase-money. It may perhaps be sufficient in all possible cases for the purchaser to say, "I am not to be sued in equity at all. I hold what was conveyed to me by one in possession, who was, or pretended to be, seised, and who conveyed to me without my having notice of another equitable title;" and that the plaintiff in equity must disprove the plea before he can proceed any further with his suit.

James LJ added a short concurring judgment, stating: "once you have arrived at the conclusion that the purchaser is a purchaser for valuable consideration without notice, the Court has not right to ask him, and has no right to put him to contest the question, how he is going to defend himself".

Mellish LJ also added a short concurring judgment, rejecting the enlarged view of constructive notice proposed by the Master of the Rolls in the court below. He stated: "The general rule seems to be laid down in the clearest terms by all the great authorities in equity, and has been acted on for a great number of years, namely, that this Court will not take an estate from a purchaser who bought for valuable consideration without notice".

== Commentary ==
Jeffrey Hackney cites the case as fundamental to the understanding of not only the bona fide purchaser rule in English trust law, but the fundamental nature of the jurisdiction of equity itself. He argues that the case shows that equity is only prepared to intervene in specific cases, and so has no jurisdiction to act outside of that limited remit. Hence the term "equity's darling" is misleading: equity did not favour the purchaser, so much as ignore him entirely.

== Bibliography ==
- Hackney, Jeffrey (1987). Understanding Equity and Trusts. Fontana. ISBN 0-00-686072-9.
- Glister, Jamie; Lee, James (2020). Hanbury & Martin: Modern Equity (22nd ed.). Sweet & Maxwell. ISBN 978-0-414-08954-9.
- McGhee, John; Elliott, Steven (2020). Snell's Equity (34th ed.). Sweet & Maxwell. ISBN 978-0-414-07150-6.
