= International Dialects of English Archive =

Archive of English dialect recordings

The International Dialects of English Archive (IDEA) is a free, online archive of primary-source dialect and accent recordings of the English language. The archive was founded by Paul Meier in 1998 at the University of Kansas and includes hundreds of recordings of English speakers throughout the world.

IDEA is divided into 10 major sections: Africa, Asia, Australia-Oceania, Caribbean, Central America, Europe, Middle East, North America, South America and Special Collections, with further divisions by country. Most speakers read a passage of scripted text and also speak some unscripted text, usually containing biographical information about themselves, such as their age, where they were born and where they have lived. This allows the listeners to evaluate the subject's accent or dialect based upon where that subject has spent most of his or her life.

The Special Collections section contains unique information related to accent and dialect studies. For instance, one subsection is devoted to Holocaust survivors while another features readings of "Comma Gets a Cure" (the standard scripted text for most IDEA subjects) by trained speech teachers in the General American dialect. Another part of the Special Collections section is devoted to oral histories and allows subjects to discuss the places in which they grew up and reflect on their heritage. Still another subsection of the Special Collections contains native speakers pronouncing place names, people names and idioms from well-known plays often produced in the theatre. The speakers sometimes add interesting commentary on these words and terms.

The geographical locations of all the subjects featured on the site can be viewed on IDEA's Global Map.

The Archive is used primarily by students of accents and dialects, researchers, linguists, actors and those wishing to either study English pronunciation or learn a new dialect or accent. Anyone can submit a sample recording by visiting the "Submit A Sample" page of the website.

University of Kansas professor emeritus and dialect coach Paul Meier, author of Accents & Dialects for Stage and Screen, created IDEA. Since its founding in 1998, the Archive has added approximately 80 associate editors, who are responsible for gathering new primary-source recordings. Senior editors are Eric Armstrong, Nadia Barnard, Geraldine Cook, Ben Corbett, Kris Danford, John Fleming, Tanera Marshall, Bill McCann, Deric McNish, David Nevell, Sarah Nichols, and Dylan Paul. Cameron Meier is executive editor.
