= James Langston =

British landowner and politician (1796–1863)

James Haughton Langston M.P.
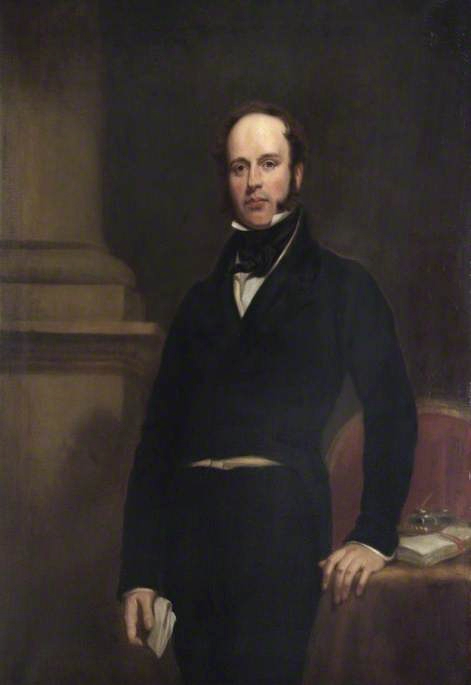
- Portrait of James Haughton Langston by Thomas Lawrence, c.1810
- Born: 1796
- Died: 1863 (aged 66–67)
- Occupation: politician
- Children: Julia

James Haughton Langston (25 May 1796 – 19 October 1863) was a British landowner and Member of Parliament.

== Life ==
He was the son of John Langston of Sarsden House, Oxfordshire, and his wife, Sarah. He was educated at Eton College (1811). He matriculated at Christ Church, Oxford in 1814, graduating DCL in 1819.

In 1812 Langston succeeded his father, inheriting the Sarsden estate. He was appointed High Sheriff of Oxfordshire for 1819–20 and verderer of Wychwood Forest.

Langston served as MP for New Woodstock from 1820 to 1826 and Oxford from 1826 to 1834 and from 1841 to 1863. He died in 1863. He had married the Hon. Julia Moreton, the daughter of Thomas Reynolds Moreton, 4th Baron Ducie. They had one daughter who survived into adulthood, Julia, to whom he bequeathed his Oxfordshire estate. In 1849 she married her cousin Lord Moreton, later 3rd Earl of Ducie.

Parliament of the United Kingdom
| Preceded by Lord Robert Spencer; Sir Henry Dashwood, Bt | Member of Parliament for Woodstock; 1820–1826; With: John Gladstone | Succeeded by Marquess of Blandford; Lord Ashley |
| Preceded by Charles Wetherell; John Ingram Lockhart | Member of Parliament for Oxford; 1826–1836; With: John Ingram Lockhart to 1830; William Hughes Hughes 1830–32; Thomas Stonor 1832–33; William Hughes Hughes from 1833 | Succeeded by William Hughes Hughes; Donald Maclean |
| Preceded by William Erle; Donald Maclean | Member of Parliament for Oxford; 1841–1863; With: Donald Maclean to 1847; Sir William Wood 1847–53; Edward Cardwell 1853 – March 1857; Charles Neate March – July 1857; Edward Cardwell from July 1857 | Succeeded by Charles Neate; Edward Cardwell |
