= Julia Reynolds-Moreton, Countess of Ducie =

English noblewoman

Julia Reynolds-Moreton, Countess of Ducie (7 October 1829 – 3 February 1895), formerly Julia Langston, was an English noblewoman, the wife of Henry Reynolds-Moreton, 3rd Earl of Ducie.

She was the daughter of James Langston, MP, of Chipping Norton, by his wife, the former Lady Julia Moreton; the latter was the daughter of Thomas Reynolds-Moreton, 1st Earl of Ducie, and her daughter was thus the first cousin of the future earl, whom she married on 24 May 1849. They had two children:

- Henry Haughton Reynolds-Moreton, Lord Moreton (1857–1920), politician, who married Ada Margarette Smith but had no children
- Lady Constance Emily Reynolds-Moreton (1850–1920), who married George Shaw-Lefevre, 1st Baron Eversley, and had no children

At the time of their marriage, the future countess held the courtesy title of Lady Moreton. Her husband succeeded to the earldom in 1853, as a result of which she became a countess.

The countess was a member of the Ladies' Diocesan Association, well known for its philanthropic efforts. Following the death of her father in 1863, she erected a memorial fountain at the parish church of All Saints in Churchill, Oxfordshire; Nikolaus Pevsner later called it "memorably ugly".

In 1872, a court case arose from the countess's inheritance, when another trustee took the earl to the Court of Chancery, contesting the countess's rights following her mother's death; the court found in her favour.

she was part of the first council of Clifton High School, Bristol

She died at Nice, France, aged 68, and is buried at St Leonard's Church, Tortworth, where her memorial, in the form of a canopied seat, can still be seen. After the death of the countess, the Earl of Ducie remained a widower until his death at the age of 94, when his titles passed to his younger brother, Berkeley Moreton, 4th Earl of Ducie.
