= John Ingram Lockhart (writer) =

John Ingram Lockhart (1812–1889) was an English writer and translator. He is known also for his involvement in radical politics.

== Life ==
Letter to Beets (1833)

He was son of James Lockhart, born in Hawkshead, at that time in Lancashire. Brought up in Haarlem, he encouraged his school friend Nicolaas Beets to translate Lord Byron. They also read Walter Scott and Laurence Sterne together. Lockhart in 1877 published a translation of a tale from Beets's 1839 work Camera Obscura, as "The Leyden Eel-bobber".

Letter to Beets (1836)

A Fellow of the Royal Astronomical Society, as his father was, in 1838 Lockhart was listed at the same address, Lanhams in Berkshire. In 1839 he contested Aylesbury as a radical candidate, nominated by John Gibbs. Charles John Baillie Hamilton was elected, Lockhart coming second ahead of George Nugent-Grenville, 2nd Baron Nugent. In 1846, when Donald Maclean who was a sitting MP for Oxford suffered bankruptcy, he put himself forward as a replacement, on a policy platform of six points: (a) abolition of church rates, (b) change in the Poor Laws, (c) abolition of primogeniture, (d) dissolution of the church courts, (e) extension of suffrage, and (f) full civil and religious liberty. He signed from Pomona Place, Fulham. His chances as a prospective candidate were affected by newspaper reports of a fight in a third-class railway carriage, which he had entered in a party with the Rev. William Langley and others.

Lockhart spoke at a broad-based reform meeting in London in March 1852. He was then a Chartist candidate in the 1852 general election for Northampton, where two Liberals were elected. At a disorderly meeting in November 1853 at the National Hall, Holborn, for an anniversary of the November uprising, supporters of George Julian Harney and Lockhart clashed to try to gain the chair. In 1855 Lockhart was a speaker for the National Reform League, in July for the State Reform Association, and in December of that year he spoke at a meeting chaired by Francis Bennoch on the Bank Charter Act.

In February 1857 Lockhart chaired a meeting against the Second Opium War; he was on the platform for a March meeting against the Opium War and Anglo-Persian War. After the watershed general election of March–April 1857, perceived to have purged from parliament radicals including John Bright, Richard Cobden and Thomas Milner Gibson, he spoke with Bronterre O'Brien at a London meeting at the Royal British Institution off City Road, chaired by Samuel Lucas. He outlined a political programme of (a) manhood suffrage, (b) more equal distribution of electors in the population, (c) no property qualification for MPs, (d) vote by ballot, and (e) triennial parliaments.

In 1862 Lockhart was in bankruptcy proceedings, as a practitioner of homoeopathy and hydropathy. At the time of his death, he was described as a familiar figure in the British Museum Reading Room.

== Works ==
- An Apology for a Thief, or the title of 'Divine Right' a mask to cover the iniquities of the great, by a British Ismaelite (1839)
- Attica and Athens (1842), translated from Karl Otfried Müller, Georg Friedrich Grotefend and others
- The Memoirs of the Conquistador Bernal Díaz del Castillo (1844), translated from the Spanish
- Report of the Fulham Charities (1846)
- The Good Boy Henry, Or, The Young Child's Book of Manners (1849), translation from the Dutch of Nicolaas Anslijn
- The Wife's Peril: A Romance (1867)
- The Triple Angel, poem

A volume of his correspondence with Nicolaas Beets was published in 1884.

== Family ==
Lockhart married Emma Marie Angela Hayward in 1841. She died in 1849.
