= William Wood, 1st Baron Hatherley =

British lawyer and statesman (1801-1881)

The Right Honourable The Lord Hatherley PC
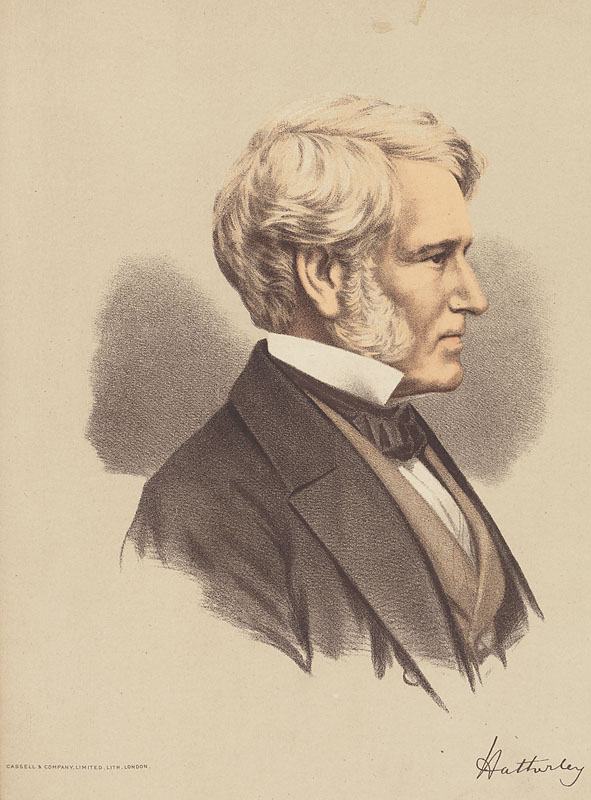

Lord Chancellor
- In office 9 December 1868 – 15 October 1872
- Monarch: Victoria
- Prime Minister: William Ewart Gladstone
- Preceded by: The Lord Cairns
- Succeeded by: The Lord Selborne

Personal details
- Born: 29 November 1801 London, England
- Died: 10 July 1881 (aged 79) London, England
- Party: Liberal
- Spouse: Charlotte Moor (m. 1830; died 1878)
- Parent: Sir Matthew Wood (father)
- Education: University of Geneva; Trinity College, Cambridge

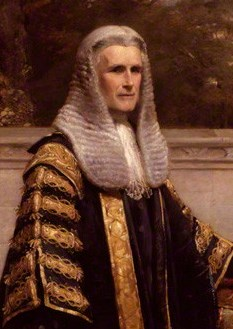
Lord Hatherley as Lord Chancellor, by George Richmond.

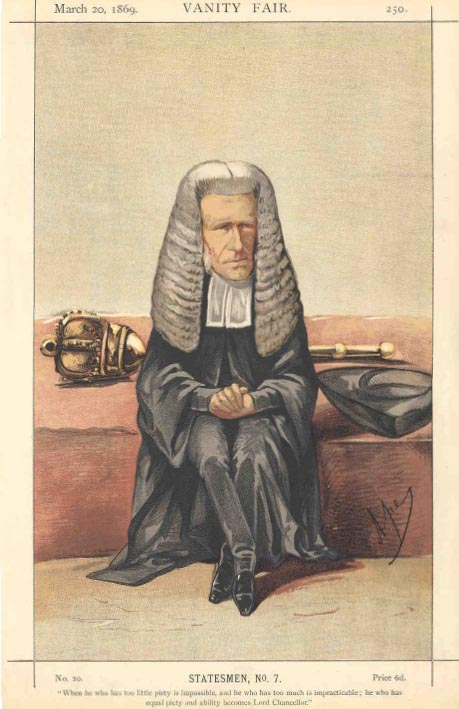
William Wood caricatured by "Ape" in Vanity Fair, 1869

William Page Wood, 1st Baron Hatherley, PC (29 November 1801 – 10 July 1881) was a British lawyer and statesman who served as a Liberal Lord High Chancellor of Great Britain between 1868 and 1872 in William Ewart Gladstone's first ministry.

== Background and education ==
Wood was born in London, the second son of Sir Matthew Wood, 1st Baronet, an alderman and Lord Mayor of London who became famous for befriending Queen Caroline and braving George IV. Sir Evelyn Wood and Katharine O'Shea were his nephew and niece respectively.

He was educated at Winchester College, from which he was expelled after a revolt against the headmaster, Woodbridge School, Geneva University, and Trinity College, Cambridge, where he became a fellow after being 24th wrangler in 1824.

== Legal and political career ==
Wood entered Lincoln's Inn, and was called to the Bar in 1824, studying conveyancing in John Tyrrell's chambers. He soon obtained a good practice as an equity draughtsman and before parliamentary committees. In 1845 he became a Queen's Counsel, and in 1847 was elected to parliament for the city of Oxford as a Liberal. In 1849 he was appointed Vice-Chancellor of the County Palatine of Lancaster, and in 1851 was made Solicitor General for England and Wales and knighted, vacating the former position in 1852. When his party returned to power in 1853, he was raised to the bench as a Vice-Chancellor.

In 1854, Wood was appointed to the Royal Commission for Consolidating the Statute Law, a royal commission to consolidate existing statutes and enactments of English law.

In 1868 he was made a Lord Justice of Appeal, but before the end of the year was selected by Gladstone to be Lord High Chancellor of Great Britain and was raised to the peerage as Baron Hatherley, of Down Hatherley in the County of Gloucester. He retired in 1872 owing to failing eyesight, but sat occasionally as a law lord.

== Family ==
Wood married Charlotte, daughter of Edward Moor, in 1830. They had no children. Charlotte's death in 1878 was a great blow to Wood, from which he never recovered, and he died in London on 10 July 1881, aged 79. Both are buried in the churchyard in Great Bealings, Suffolk, where Charlotte's brother was rector. The title became extinct on his death.

== Arms ==
Coat of arms of William Wood, 1st Baron Hatherley
Crest Out of a mural crown Argent a demi wild man wreathed about the temples with oak fructed in the dexter hand an oak tree eradicated and fructed and in the sinister hand a club all Proper. Escutcheon Quarterly Argent and Or the sceptre or mace representing that of the Lord Mayor of the City of London (the same being of crystal the head terminating in crosses patties and fleurs-de-lis and the whole richly ornamented with gold, pearls, and precious stones) in pale, between an oak tree on a mount Vert fructed Proper in the 1st and 4th quarters; and in the 2nd and 3rd a bull's head erased, Sable, charged on the neck with a bezant. Supporters On either side a wild man wreathed about the waist and temples with oak fructed across the shoulders a belt of ivy and in the exterior hand a club, all Proper. Motto Defend The Right

== See also ==
- Page Wood Baronets
- Pilcher v Rawlins

Parliament of the United Kingdom
Preceded by Donald Maclean; James Langston	Member of Parliament for Oxford; 1847–1853; With: James Langston	Succeeded by James Langston; Edward Cardwell
Legal offices
Preceded by Sir Alexander Cockburn, Bt	Solicitor General; 1851–1852	Succeeded by Sir Fitzroy Kelly
Preceded by Sir John Stuart	Vice-Chancellor of the High Court; 1853–1868	Succeeded by Sir Richard Malins
Political offices
Preceded by The Lord Cairns	Lord High Chancellor of Great Britain; 1868–1872	Succeeded by The Lord Selborne
Peerage of the United Kingdom
New creation	Baron Hatherley; 1868–1881	Extinct
