= Donald Maclean (MP, died 1874) =

British barrister and member of parliament

Donald Maclean (1800 – 21 March 1874) was a British barrister and Conservative member of parliament.

The son of Fitzroy Jeffreys Grafton Maclean, of Barbados, who later became Clan Chief of Clan Maclean and inherited a baronetcy, Maclean was educated at Eton and Balliol College, Oxford. In 1823 he was elected as the first President of the newly created Oxford Union, graduated BA in 1823, and was called to the bar from Lincoln's Inn in 1827. From 1835 to 1847 he was one of the two members of parliament for the City of Oxford constituency, sitting for the Conservative Party, and in 1844 was awarded the degree of Doctor of Civil Laws.

He was the younger brother of Sir Charles Maclean, 9th Baronet. In 1827 he married Harriet, daughter of General Frederick Maitland, and died in 1874.

== Notes ==
Parliament of the United Kingdom
Preceded by James Langston; William Hughes Hughes	Member of Parliament for City of Oxford; 1835–1847; With: William Hughes Hughes 1835–1837; William Erle 1837–1841; James Langston 1841–1847	Succeeded by William Wood; James Langston
