= John Macpherson Macleod =

Sir John Macpherson Macleod, KCSI, PC (14 January 1792 – 1 March 1881) was an East India Company official.

== Biography ==
Macleod was born in Ardarden, Dunbartonshire, the eldest son of Donald Macleod of St. Kilda, colonel in the Madras army, by his wife, Diana, daughter of Donald Macdonald of Tormore in Invernessshire. He was educated at the University of Edinburgh and East India Company College, and obtained a writership in the Madras civil service on 27 July 1811.

On 7 January 1814, he was appointed second assistant to the secretary to government in the several civil departments, and on 8 July was promoted to be first assistant. In 1816 he was nominated secretary and member of the committee for revising the customs laws. After a three years' visit to England he was appointed acting secretary to government in the financial and general departments on 27 June 1823, and on 6 July 1824 he was permanently confirmed as secretary. In 1825 he became Tamil translator to government, and member of the college board, of the board of public instruction, and of the mint committee. On 14 April 1826 he was nominated Persian translator to government, and on 20 February 1827 he became secretary in the revenue and judicial departments. On 16 January 1829 he was appointed a temporary member of the board of revenue, and he afterwards was permanently confirmed third member.

On 22 June 1832 he received the post of commissioner for the government of Mysore, and in 1834 he was deputed to Hyderabad on special duty by the governor-general. Macleod's work in Mysore was of special importance. The province had in the previous year been transferred from native rule to English superintendence. The task of organising the financial and political administration fell largely upon him and was carried out with ability and success. On 19 February 1835 he became a member of the Indian law commission, and in 1836 member of the committee for revising the system of prison discipline throughout India.

He returned to England in July 1838 and retired from the service in 1841. In 1866 he was appointed KCSI, and in 1871 a privy councillor. He died on 1 March 1881 at his London residence, 1 Stanhope Street, Hyde Park. In 1822 he married Catharine, daughter of William Greig of Thornhill in the county of Stirling.
