= Accent reduction =

Adopting a new manner of pronunciation

Accent reduction, also known as accent modification or accent neutralization, is a systematic approach for learning or adopting a new speech accent. It is the process of learning the sound system (or phonology) and melodic intonation of a language so the non-native speaker can communicate with clarity.

== Training ==
Accent modification is offered by various speech-language pathologists, acting coaches, and linguists. Speech-language pathologists offer accent modification services but do not "treat" accents or dialects, because neither are considered communication disorders. The goal of accent training is not to suppress the accent entirely, nor is it to sever the connection between the speaker and their cultural-linguistic background. Rather, the impetus behind accent modification is to improve the intelligibility of speech to non-familiar listeners.

Areas of focus may include teaching students clear articulation of vowels and consonants as well as the intonation patterns that are unique to each language. The learning sequence is typically broken down into progressive learning segments until they cumulate into using the newly learned skills in conversation. Additional areas might include linking, rate, or voice projection. Instructor-led accent training will also frequently include conversational practice to help the student transfer these newly learned skills into everyday conversations.

Training timelines can vary from a few days to several months depending upon the chosen model of instruction.

Although accents can be minimized through training, eliminating an accent is difficult and can take years.

== By language ==
=== In English ===
Accent improvement focuses on teaching students how to pronounce difficult sounds such as /θ/, /ð/, /ɹ/, /l/, and /w/; intonation, stress, and rhythm. Spanish and Portuguese speakers might add an /h/ before the vowel /ɪ/, as in "his" for "is". Therefore, vowel sounds are also covered in accent reduction training. Practicing of the vowel /ɪ/ most commonly spelled "i" is done by reciting a few of the following differences: his versus is, hit versus it, hill versus ill. By not letting the back of their tongue touch the palate, native speakers of Asian languages (Chinese, etc.) can avoid adding a /j/ before the /ɪ/ for example in speaking "yin" instead of "in".

Although the accents can be reduced through training, some linguists warn against giving students a false hope that they will lose their accents. According to Dennis Baron, a linguistics professor at the University of Illinois at Urbana-Champaign, eliminating an accent is difficult. Calming an accent, he said, takes years of interaction with native English speakers. Even so, under U.S. labor law, employers can make job decisions based on accent if it interferes with work. The federal Equal Employment Opportunity Commission does receive a number of complaints every year from individuals who believe they are victims of accent-related job discrimination.

The actors Portia de Rossi, Anthony LaPaglia, Katherine Langford, and Charlize Theron are examples of notable people who received such training to lose their native accents and develop American accents, even in everyday speech.

With regard to English accent training, the two most distinct choices of accent reduction are the British or American pathways.

== See also ==
- Dialect levelling
- Anglophone pronunciation of foreign languages
- Koiné language
- Non-native pronunciations of English
