= Peter Erle =

English lawyer

Peter Erle PC QC (1795 – 29 January 1877) was an English lawyer.

== Biography ==
Erle was the fourth son of the Reverend Christopher Erle of Gillingham, Dorset, and brother of Sir William Erle. He matriculated at New College, Oxford in 1812, where he graduated in 1816. Having been called to the Bar by the Middle Temple in Trinity Term, 1821, he became a Queen's Counsel in 1854, and was for some time one of the Charity Commissioners, being appointed first Chief Commissioner in 1853, and remaining the longest-serving Chief Commissioner to date. He was elected Treasurer of the Middle Temple in 1863. He was made a Privy Councillor in 1872.

== Personal life ==
Erle married in 1824 Mary Fearon, daughter of the Rev. Joseph Francis Fearon. They had one son, Twynihoe William Erle (died 1908), a barrister.

== Bibliography ==
- Hutchinson, J. (1902). A Catalogue of Notable Middle Templars: With Brief Biographical Notices. London: Butterworth.
