= John Ingram Lockhart =

British politician

John Ingram Lockhart (5 September 1766 – 13 August 1835) was a British politician. At the end of his life he was known as John Wastie. He sat as a Member of Parliament for Oxford from 1807 until 1818, and again from 1820 until 1830. He was Recorder of Romsey until 1834, and was Recorder of Oxford from March 1834 until his death the following year.

== Life ==
John Ingram Lockhart, of Sherfield House, near Romsey, Hampshire, and Great Haseley House, Oxfordshire, was the youngest son of three children of James Lockhart of Melchett Park, Wiltshire, and London, a partner in Lockhart, Wallace, and Co., bankers, Pall Mall; his mother was Mary Harriot Gray, of the Society of Friends. James Lockhart was his brother.

Lockhart was baptised on 3 October 1765 at St Dunstan-in-the-East, London. He went to Eton College in 1779, and then University College, Oxford under the tutelage of Edward Hawtrey (1741–1803), where he matriculated on 5 May 1783, aged 17. He entered Lincoln's Inn 7 May 1783, studied 1786 to 1787 another year of law at Göttingen University and was called to the bar on 14 June 1790. He went the Oxford circuit, and was created Doctor of Civil Law (D.C.L.) on 14 June 1820.

At one point Lockhart was political agent for Henry Peters in the Oxford seat. Later, in 1802, he stood for the seat himself; and Peters, after some delay, declined the contest. In the 1812 he beat George Eden, the Duke of Marlborough's candidate, into third place.

In 1827, Lockhart purchased 210 acres in North-Marston, Buckingham belonging to yeoman William Flower, previously the property of Charles and Richard Watkins, of Daventry, Northampton (who held that estate in 1775). Lockhart unsuccessfully contested Oxford 1802, 1806, 1818, and 1830, but represented it 1807–18, and 1820–30.

He was Recorder of Romsey until October 1834, appointed Deputy Recorder of Oxford to Sir William Elias Taunton (1773–1835) in 1830, and succeeded that distinguished Judge as Recorder of Oxford March 1835, but died at Great Haseley, Oxfordshire, England on 13 August following, aged 70.

== Family ==
Lockhart was married on 14 January 1804 to Mary Gilkes-Wastie, the only child and heir of Francis Wastie of Cowley (d.1775), and Great-Haseley House, and took the name of Wastie in lieu of Ingram-Lockhart by Act of Parliament 12 October 1831. The change of name was to enable him to hold his wife's estates after her death.

Parliament of the United Kingdom
| Preceded by Francis Burton; John Atkyns-Wright | Member of Parliament for Oxford; 1807–1818; With: Francis Burton (1807–1812); John Atkyns-Wright (1812–1818) | Succeeded by John Atkyns-Wright; Frederick St John |
| Preceded by John Atkyns-Wright; Frederick St John | Member of Parliament for Oxford; 1820–1830; With: Charles Wetherell (1820–1826); James Langston (1826–1830) | Succeeded by James Langston; William Hughes Hughes |
Honorary titles
| Preceded by ? | Recorder of Oxford; 1835 | Succeeded by William Elias Taunton (1773–1835) |
