= Anglophone pronunciation of foreign languages =

English speakers' pronunciation of other languages

The following is a list of common non-native pronunciations that English speakers make when trying to speak foreign languages. Many of these are due to transfer of phonological rules from English to the new language as well as differences in grammar and syntax that they encounter.

This article uses International Phonetic Alphabet pronunciation. See Help:IPA pronunciation key and IPA chart for English for an introduction.

== Indo-European languages ==
=== German ===
- One of the most difficult is German /eː/ as it is further forward in the mouth than in varieties of Standard English so that speakers may pronounce German geht as if it were English gate.
- Similarly, speakers may pronounce German /oː/ with the vowel of goat so that ohne is pronounced [ˈəʊnə].
- Speakers tend to have difficulty with the front rounded vowels, /øː/, /œ/, /yː/, and /ʏ/ (written ⟨ö⟩ and ⟨ü⟩).
- Speakers have some difficulty with German /a/, which may be pronounced as [æ] or [ɑ(ː)]. Equally, /aː/ may be pronounced as [ɑː], though this is less problematic since the same realisation is also used by some native speakers.
- Speakers have difficulty with the two sounds represented by ⟨ch⟩ ([x] and [ç]) in German, particularly the latter. Often both are replaced with [k]; replacement of [ç] with [ʃ] is also common.
- Speakers may have trouble pronouncing German ⟨l⟩ as a clear l in positions where it is a dark l in English (that is, in the syllable coda).

=== Russian ===
- Some speakers have difficulty with the trilled [r] in Russian, especially the palatalized [rʲ] since neither are sounds of English.
  - Non-rhotic speakers, even after learning the rolled-r, are prone to omit /r/ in such Russian words as удар [ʊˈdar] ('blow') and горка [ˈɡorkə] ('hillock').
- Depending on the speaker's dialect, they may have difficulty with "dark l" [ɫ] (that is, velarized [l], which in Russian contrasts with a palatalized [lʲ]) in positions other than in the syllable coda.
- Difficulty with Russian vowels:
  - Most English speakers have no [ɨ] (although it is an allophone in some dialects, see weak vowel merger) and speakers generally have difficulty producing the sound. They may instead produce [ɪ].
  - Speakers may replace /e/ with the diphthong in day. e.g. [ˈdeɪlə] instead of [ˈdʲelə] дело ('affair').
  - Speakers are more likely to diphthongize /u/, making сижу [sʲɪˈʐu] ('I sit') sound more like [sɪˈʒʊu]. Some speakers may also universally front it to [ʉ].
  - Speakers may also diphthongize /i/ in a similar fashion, especially in open syllables.
  - Speakers may have difficulty with Russian /o/, pronouncing it as either [ɔ] or [oʊ].
  - It is likely that speakers will make the second element of Russian diphthongs insufficiently close, making them resemble English diphthongs (e.g., [druzʲeɪ] instead of [druzʲej]) or pronounce it too long.
  - Speakers may pronounce /a/ as [æ] in closed syllables так ('so') and [ɑ] in open syllables два ('two').
- Speakers may also have difficulty with the Russian vowel reduction system as well as other allophonic vowels.
  - Tendency to reverse the distribution of [ɐ] and [ə]. English speakers tend to pronounce [ə] in the pretonic position, right where [ɐ] is required in Russian, while they pronounce [ɐ] in pre-pretonic positions, where [ə] occurs. Thus, speakers may say голова ('head') as [ɡɐləˈva] instead of [ɡəlɐˈva] and сторона ('side') as [stɐrəˈna] instead of [stərɐˈna].
- There are no cues to indicate correct stress in Russian. Speakers must memorize where primary and secondary stress resides in each word and are likely to make mistakes.
- Speakers tend to fail to geminate double consonants.

=== Serbo-Croatian ===
- Speakers may have a difficulty with Serbo-Croatian pitch accent and vowel length. This rarely leads to loss of intelligibility as long as the word stress is correct.
  - Speakers may transfer vowel length from English, producing longer vowels before voiced consonants (such as /b/ or /z/) and shorter vowels before the voiceless ones (such as /p/ or /s/) - see pre-fortis clipping. In Serbo-Croatian, vowels can be long or short in any environment; in fact, there are minimal pairs based only on length: compare grad /ɡrâd/ ('city') with grad /ɡrâːd/ ('hail').
  - If speakers learn to produce correct vowel length, they may diphthongize long /iː, uː, eː, oː/ to [ɪi, ʊu, eɪ, oʊ] instead of the correct [iː, uː, eː, oː].
- Speakers may incorrectly reduce unstressed vowels to [ə], yielding pronunciations such as [ləpǒtə] instead of [lepǒta] for lepota ('beauty'). In Serbo-Croatian, vowels do not change their quality in unstressed positions.
- Voiced consonants (/b, d, ɡ, dʒ, dʑ, z, ʒ/) can be only partially [b̥, d̥, ɡ̊, d̥ʒ̊, d̥ʑ̊, z̥, ʒ̊] rather than fully voiced [b, d, ɡ, dʒ, dʑ, z, ʒ].
  - Similarly, /ʋ/ (which phonologically is an approximant and therefore not the voiced counterpart of /f/) can also be realized as a partially voiced fricative [v̥] instead of a fully voiced weak fricative [ʋ̝].
- Speakers may incorrectly realize the voiceless stops /p, t, k/ as aspirated [pʰ, tʰ, kʰ].
- Speakers may realize /n, t, d/ as alveolar [n, t, d] rather than dental [n̪, t̪, d̪].
  - Speakers may incorrectly transfer allophones of English /t/ to Serbo-Croatian, yielding pronunciations such as [tʃûɾi] instead of [tʃûti] for čuti ('to hear') or [ɲûʔn̩] instead of [ɲûtn̩] for njutn ('newton'), all of which sound strange to native ears and might not even be understood as belonging to the /t/ phoneme, potentially leading to a serious loss of intelligibility.
- Speakers may have a difficulty distinguishing /tʃ, dʒ/ from /tɕ, dʑ/. This does not lead to loss of intelligibility as many natives merge them as well.
  - Speakers who try to distinguish /tʃ, dʒ/ from /tɕ, dʑ/ may realize the former with inappropriate palatalization, i.e. as palato-alveolar [tʃ, dʒ] instead of flat postalveolar (laminal retroflex) [t̻ʂ̻, d̻ʐ̻].
  - The same applies to /ʃ, ʒ/, which can be realized as [ʃ, ʒ] instead of [ʂ̻, ʐ̻].
- Speakers may realize /x/ as glottal [h], rather than a weak velar fricative [x̞].
- The palatal sounds /ɲ, ʎ/ may be realized as sequences [nj, lj].
- Instead of a trill [r], /r/ can be realized as a postalveolar approximant [ɹ̠].
- /j/ preceded within the same word by a vowel (as in gaj /ɡâːj/ ('grove')) can be articulated with an insufficiently raised tongue ([ɪ̯] instead of [i̯] or [j]).

=== Spanish ===
- Substitution of [ɹ̠] for [r].
- "R-coloration" of vowels, especially at the end of infinitives.
- Speakers often pronounce /t, d/ as alveolar [t(ʰ), d] rather than dental [t̪ , d̪].
- The voiceless stops /p, t, k/ may be realized as aspirated [pʰ, tʰ, kʰ].
- Speakers may pronounce the phonemes /b, d, g/ as stops even in contexts where they would be normally pronounced as approximant [β̞, ð̞, ɣ̞].
- ⟨v⟩ may be pronounced as [v], as it is in English, rather than /b/.
- ⟨z⟩ may be pronounced as [z], as it is in English, rather than /θ/ or /s/.
- Some speakers may pronounce ⟨h⟩ as [h] even though ⟨h⟩ is normally silent in Spanish.
- The rising diphthongs beginning with [j] are often split into two syllables, especially when they succeed alveolar consonants.
- /ɲ/ is often realized as the consonant cluster /nj/.
- /x/ is often realized as glottal [h].
- Consonantal ⟨y⟩ and ⟨ll⟩ are usually realized as [j].
- Unstressed vowels may be incorrectly reduced to [ə].

== Mandarin Chinese ==
- Many English speakers, especially monolinguals, typically have more difficulty with the 4 lexical tones of Mandarin Chinese.

== Esperanto ==
- English speakers tend to assimilate /m/ to [ɱ] before /f/ or /v/, as well /n/ to [ŋ] before /k/ or /ɡ/, neither of which occurs in "strictly regular" Esperanto. However, since Zamenhof himself recognized this type of assimilation, there is debate over whether this is actually an error.
- Speakers tend to pronounce Esperanto /e/ as [eɪ], the vowel of pay.
- Speakers tend to reduce unstressed vowels.
- Speakers tend to pronounce /x/ as [k] or otherwise have a hard time pronouncing it. This sort of difficulty is behind the gradual shift from ⟨ĥ⟩ to ⟨k⟩ (see Esperanto phonology#Loss of phonemic ĥ).
- Speakers tend to pronounce the rhotic consonant as [ɹ], rather than an alveolar trill. Speakers of non-rhotic accents tend to mute the r when at end of a word or before a consonant.
- Other pronunciation difficulties are related to spelling pronunciations of digraphs. The digraph ⟨sc⟩ represents /st͡s/, though speakers may substitute [s] or [sk]. The digraph ⟨kn⟩ represents /kn/, though speakers may mute the /k/. The ⟨g⟩ in the digraph ⟨ng⟩ is always pronounced.

== See also ==
- Accent reduction
- Non-native pronunciations of English

== Bibliography ==
- Alexander, Ronelle (2006), Bosnian/Croatian/Serbian – A Grammar with Sociolinguistic Commentary, The University of Wisconsin Press, ISBN 978-0-299-21194-3
- Blanke, Detlev (2001), Studoj pri interlingvistiko, Studien zur Interlinguistik (in Esperanto and German), KAVA-PECH, ISBN 80-85853-53-1
- Hodge, Carlton H.; Janković, Janko (1965), Serbo-Croatian Basic Course, vol. 1, Foreign Service Institute
- Gottfried, T.L.; Suiter, T.L. (1997), "Effect of linguistic experience on the identification of Mandarin tones", Journal of Phonetics, 25: 207–231, doi:10.1006/jpho.1997.0042
- Hall, Christopher (2003), Modern German pronunciation: An introduction for speakers of English (2nd ed.), New York: Manchester University Press
- Jones, Daniel; Ward, Dennis (1969), The Phonetics of Russian, Cambridge University Press
- Kordić, Snježana (1997), Serbo-Croatian, Languages of the World/Materials; 148, Munich & Newcastle: Lincom Europa, ISBN 3-89586-161-8
- Morén, Bruce (2005), Consonant-Vowel Interactions in Serbian: Features, Representations and Constraint Interactions (PDF), Center for Advanced Study of Theoretical Linguistics, Tromsø, archived from the original (PDF) on 2009-09-29
- Zamenhof, L.L. (1963), Fundamento de Esperanto, Esperantaj Francaj Eldonoj
