= Non-native pronunciations of English =

Overview of English-learners' pronunciation

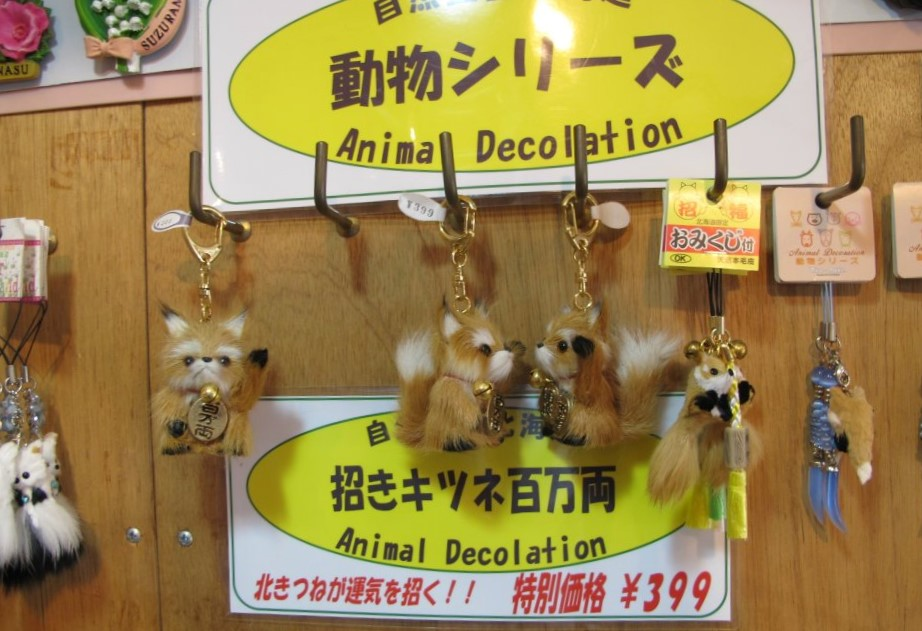
This gift shop in Japan spells the English word "decoration" as decolation, as a result of the well-attested difficulty of Japanese speakers in distinguishing English ⟨l⟩ and ⟨r⟩ sounds.

Non-native pronunciations of English result from the common linguistic phenomenon in which non-native speakers of any language tend to transfer the intonation, phonological processes and pronunciation rules of their first language into their English speech. They may also create innovative pronunciations not found in the speaker's native language.

== Overview ==
Non-native English speakers may pronounce words differently than native speakers either because they apply the speech rules of their mother tongue to English ("interference") or through implementing strategies similar to those used in first language acquisition. They may also create innovative pronunciations for English sounds not found in the speaker's first language.

The extent to which native speakers can identify a non-native accent is linked to the age at which individuals begin to immerse themselves in a language. Scholars disagree on the precise nature of this link, which might be influenced by a combination of factors, including: neurological plasticity, cognitive development, motivation, psychosocial states, formal instruction, language learning aptitude, and the usage of their first (L1) and second (L2) languages.

English is unusual in that speakers rarely produce an audible release between consonant clusters and often overlap constriction times. Speaking English with a timing pattern that is dramatically different may lead to speech that is difficult to understand.

Phonological differences between a speaker's native language and English often lead to neutralization of distinctions in their English. Moreover, differences in sound inventory or distribution can result in difficult English sounds being substituted or dropped entirely. This is more common when the distinction is subtle between English sounds or between a sound of English and of a speaker's native language. While there is no evidence to suggest that a simple absence of a sound or sequence in one language's phonological inventory makes it difficult to learn, several theoretical models have presumed that non-native speech perceptions reflect both the abstract phonological properties and phonetic details of the native language.

Non-native speech patterns can be passed on to the children of learners, who will then exhibit some of the same characteristics despite being native speakers themselves. For example, this process has resulted in many of the distinctive qualities of Irish English and Highland English which were heavily influenced by a Goidelic substratum.

== Examples from Indo-European languages ==
=== Germanic languages ===
==== Dutch ====
Consonants

- Speakers have difficulty with dental fricatives, often pronouncing /ð/ as [d] (failing to contrast then and den) or [s] (especially between vowels). Similarly, the dental fricative /θ/ is replaced by [s] or [t], though Belgian speakers may pronounce both /θ/ and /ð/ as [f] in word-final position.
- The voiced stops and fricatives undergo terminal devoicing, especially in stressed syllables, causing feed and feet to be pronounced as the latter. Similarly, Dutch voicing assimilation patterns may be applied to English utterances so that, for example, iceberg is pronounced as [aɪzbɜːɹk], and if I as [ɪv aɪ].
- Speakers have difficulty with the glottalization of /p t k/, either not pronouncing it or applying it in the wrong contexts so that good morning is pronounced [ɡʊʔ ˈmɔːnɪŋ].
- The voiceless stops /p t k/ lack aspiration in stressed syllable-initial context.
- Medial /t/ is replaced by /d/ such that better is pronounced as [bɛdə].
- The postalveolar sibilants /tʃ dʒ ʃ ʒ/ tend to be pronounced as their alveolo-palatal equivalents in Dutch: [tɕ dʑ ɕ ʑ]; beginners may pronounce them as alveolar (and voiceless) [ts] or [s] in syllable-final positions, leading to wish being pronounced as [wɪs].
- /ɡ/ may be confused with /k/ and /v/ with /f/ in initial position.
- /l/ may be strongly pharyngealized, even in contexts where the dark l does not normally appear in English. Beginners may insert an epenthetic schwa between /l/ and a following /p, f, m, k/, leading to milk being pronounced as [ˈmɪlək].
- /h/ could pose difficulties for certain regional dialects which lack /h/, such as in Zeelandic and West Flemish.
- /w/ is replaced by [ʋ], which English listeners may perceive as /v/.
- The alveolar consonants /t, d, n, s, z, l/ are articulated with the blade of the tongue, rather than the tip as in English.

Vowels

- Speakers confuse between /æ/ and /ɛ/, so that man and men are both pronounced as the latter.
- Speakers confuse between /uː/ and /ʊ/, so that pool and pull are both pronounced with [u]. Some advanced speakers may employ a glide [ʉy].
- /iː/ is pronounced closer, tenser, and sometimes shorter than usual. Some advanced speakers might over-compensate for the length with a diphthong like [ëi].
- /ʌ/ is replaced by [ʉ]. Spelling might cause confusion with /ɒ/ in words like wonder, nothing and lovely.
- British English /ɒ/ is replaced by [ɔ].
- British English /ɜː/ is replaced by the sequence in Dutch /ør/, with significant lip-rounding and r-insertion.
- /eɪ/ is replaced by [eː].
- /əʊ/ is replaced by [oː]. More advanced speakers might use the Dutch diphthong [eːu].
- /aɪ/ tends to be overly long before fortis consonants, giving the impression of a following lenis consonant.

==== German ====
General

- German has a smaller pitch range, less consonant cluster reduction, and less vowel reduction.

Consonants

- Speakers may not velarize /l/ in coda positions as most native speakers do.
- German features terminal devoicing, which is often carried over to English (creating homophones in cub/cup, had/hat, etc.)
- German features neither /ð/ ("the") nor /θ/ ("think"), and both are often realised as either /s/ or /f/ (think/sink, thought/fought, etc.)
- German speakers tend to realise /w/ (written ⟨w⟩ in English) as [v] (also written ⟨w⟩ in German) when speaking English.
- The German /r/ is realised differently from the English /r/. Whereas in the former case the tongue touches the uvula, in the latter case it does not.
- After German speakers master the pronunciation of [w], some of them hypercorrect to incorrectly pronounce the [v] phoneme in English as [w] without realizing it.

=== Hellenic languages ===
==== Greek ====
Consonants

- Greek speakers tend to struggle with the difference between /s/ and /ʃ/.
- /tʃ/ and /dʒ/ can be replaced by [ts] or [dz].
- /p t k/ tend to be unaspirated.
- Greek speakers may pronounce the English rhotic as a flap [ɾ].
- The closest sound to English /h/ in Greek is [x], and speakers may substitute this sound in words like house.

Vowels

- The English vowels [ɪ] (bit) and [iː] (beat) are conflated.

=== Romance languages ===
==== Catalan ====
Consonants

- Devoicing of final consonants: /b d ɡ v z dʒ ʒ/ to [p t k f s tʃ ʃ].

E.g. phase can be pronounced like face (even though Catalan has both /s/ and /z/ phonemes).

- Confusion of /b/ /v/, usually realized as [b~β] (/b/ /v/ are only distinguished in Valencian and Balearic).
- Rhotic pronunciation, with /r/ pronounced as a trill [r] or a flap [ɾ].
- Difficulties with word-initial clusters involving /s/, where an epenthetic e is usually added.

E.g. stop being pronounced estop.

- Simplification of some word consonant clusters.

E.g. instant being pronounced instan

Vowels

- Vowel length confusions.
- Confusion of /æ/ /ɑ(ː)/ /ʌ/, usually realized as [a]
- Confusion of /ɪ/ /i(ː)/, usually realized as [i].
- Confusion of /ʊ/ /u(ː)/, usually realized as [u].
- Confusion of /ɔ(ː)/ /ɒ/, usually realized as [ɔ] or [o].

Suprasegmental features

- Narrower pitch range, with emphasis marked with extra length instead of extra pitch variation.
- Problems with variable stress.

E.g. the blackbird vs. the black bird.

- Problems with contrastive stress.

E.g. with sugar or without sugar? (the second sugar is more heavily stressed)

==== Italian ====
Studies on Italian speakers' pronunciation of English revealed the following characteristics:

General

Italians learning English have a tendency to pronounce words as they are spelled, so that walk is [walk], guide is [ɡwid̪], and boiled is [ˈbɔilɛd]. This is also true for loanwords borrowed from English as water (water closet), which is pronounced [ˈvat̪ɛr] instead of [ˈwɔːtə(r)].

Consonants

- Tendency to realise /ŋ/ as [ŋɡ] ("singer" rhymes with "finger") or as [n] because Italian [ŋ] is an allophone of /n/ before velar stops.
- Tendency to realise word-initial /sm/ with [zm], e.g. small [zmɔl]. This voicing also applies to /sl/ and /sn/. The main reason is that the letter "s" is always pronounced as /z/ before a voiced consonant in Italian.
- Italian does not have dental fricatives:
  - Voiceless /θ/ may be realised as [t̪] or [f].
  - Voiced /ð/ may be realised as [d̪].
- Since /t/ and /d/ are typically pronounced as dental stops anyway, words like there and dare can become homophones.
- Tendency to pronounce /k/, /p/, /t/ as unaspirated stops.
- Italian speakers may pronounce consonant-final English words with a strong vocalic offset, especially in isolated words, e.g. dog [ˈdɔɡːə].
- Tendency to realise /r/ as [r]; a trill rather than the native approximant [ɹ]~[ɻ], even when the dialect of English they are learning is nonrhotic.

Vowels

- /ɪ/ and /iː/ are pronounced [i] (ship and sheep are homophones);
- /æ/ (in certain words) and /ɛ/ are pronounced [ɛ] (bad and bed are homophones);
- /æ/ (in certain words), /ʌ/, and /ɑː/ are pronounced [a] (bat, but, and bath are homophones);
- /ʊ/ and /uː/ are pronounced [u] (cook and kook are homophones);
- Speakers tend to have little difficulty with /ɒ/, though some might pronounce it as [ɑ] or [a]).
- The pronunciation of /ɔː/, /əʊ/, and /oʊ/ are variable, pronounced as [o] or [ɒ].
- The /əl/ sequence in words like bottle is realized as [ʌl], [ɒl], or [ʊl].
- Schwa [ə] does not exist in Italian; speakers tend to give the written vowel its full pronunciation, e.g. lemon [ˈlɛmɔn], television [ˌt̪ɛleˈviʒɔn], parrot [ˈpar(ː)ɔt̪], intelligent [in̪ˈt̪ɛl(ː)idʒɛn̪t̪], water [ˈwɔt̪ɛr], sugar [ˈʃuɡar].

==== French ====
Consonants

- Because of the phonetic differences between English and French rhotics, speakers may perceive English /r/, allophonically labialized to [ɹʷ], as /w/-like and have trouble distinguishing between /r/ and /w/.
- French speakers have difficulty with /h/ and many delete it, as most French dialects do not have this sound.
- French speakers have difficulty with dental fricatives /θ/ and /ð/ (since these sounds do not exist in French). In France they may be pronounced as /s/ and /z/, while in Quebec, Canada, the usual substitution is /t/ and /d/.
- Speakers tend not to make a contrast between /ɪ/ (as in ship) and /iː/. (as in sheep).

==== Portuguese ====
Brazilian speakers of English as a second language are likely to exhibit several non-standard pronunciation features, including:

Vowels

- Confusion of /ɪ/ and /iː/, usually realized as [i], and of /ʊ/ and /uː/, usually realized as [u].
- Especially in a British context, confusion of /əʊ/ and /ɒ/. The Brazilian /ɔ/ is equivalent to RP English /ɒ/, and English orthography rarely makes a clear demarcation between the phonemes, thus cold (ideally [ˈkɜʊ̯ɫd]) might be homophone with called /ˈkɔːld/. The North American equivalent of British /əʊ/, /oʊ/, may be easier to perceive as it closely resembles the Portuguese diphthong [ow]. Speakers may also have trouble distinguishing between schwa and /ʌ/.
- In a British context, the diphthong /əʊ/ might also be pronounced as the Portuguese diphthong eu, [ew].
- Persistent preference for /æ/ over /ɑː/ (even if the target pronunciation is England's prestige accent), and use of /æ/ within the IPA [ɛ] space (Portuguese /ɛ/ is often [æ], which makes it even more prone to confusion in production and perception), so that can't, even in RP, might sound like an American pronunciation of Kent. Some might even go as far as having [le̞st] instead of /læst ~ lɑːst/ for last.

Consonants

- Difficulty with dental fricatives /θ/ and /ð/. These may be instead fronted [f v], stopped [t̪ d̪] or hissed [s̻ z̻].
- Speakers may pronounce word-initial r as a guttural r pronunciations or a trill. These often sound to English speakers as /h/, leading to confusion between ray and hay, red and head, height and right, etc.
- Neutralization of coda /m n ŋ/, giving preference to a multitude of nasal vowels (often forming random diphthongs with [j̃ w̃ ɰ̃], or also randomly losing them, so that sent and saint, and song and sown, are homophonous) originating from their deletion. Vowels are also often strongly nasalized when stressed and succeeded by a nasal consonant, even if said consonant starts a full syllable after it.
- Fluctuation of the levels of aspiration of voiceless stops /p t k/, that might sound like /b d g/.
- Loss of contrast between coronal stops /t d/ and post-alveolar affricates /tʃ dʒ/ due to palatalization of the earlier, before vowels such as /iː/, /ɪ/, /juː/, and /ɨ/.
- The insertion of [i] to break up consonant clusters.
- Palatalization due to epenthetic /ɪ ~ iː/, so that night sounds slightly like nightch ([ˈnajtɕ ~ ˈnajtɕi̥] rather than /ˈnaɪt/) and light sounds like lightchie ([ˈlajtɕi] rather than /laɪt/).
- Loss of unstressed, syllable-final [i ~ ɪ ~ ɨ] to palatalization, so that city sounds slightly like sitch ([ˈsitɕ ~ sitɕi̥] rather than /ˈsɪti/).
- Post-alveolar affricates /tʃ dʒ/ are easily confused with their fricative counterparts /ʃ ʒ/, often merging chip and ship, cheap and sheep, and pledger and pleasure.
- Absence of contrast of voice for coda fricatives. He's, hiss and his are easily confused with each other. Spelling pronunciations are also possible, in which all words that historically contain schwas in their orthography are pronounced as /z/, even when the usual pronunciation would be /s/.
- English is less prone to perfect liaison-style sandhi than Portuguese, Spanish and French might be. Often, two identical or very similar consonants follow each other within a row, each in a different word, and both should be pronounced. Brazilians might either perform epenthesis or delete one of them. As such, this stop is produced either [ˈdis i̥sˈtɒpi̥ ~ ˈdiz isˈtɒpi̥] or [ˈdi sˈtɒpi̥], instead of the native /ðɪs ˈstɒp/
- In Portuguese, the semivowels [j] and [w] may be vocalized to their corresponding vowels ([i] and [u], respectively). so that I love you is pronounced [ˈaj ˈlɐviː ˈuː]. These semivowels may also be epenthetically inserted between vowels of very dissimilar qualities.
- With the exception of /s ~ z/ (here represented with a loss of contrast at the end of a word) and /r/, consonants tend to not elide corresponding to or assimilate to the next word's phoneme, even in connected speech. This means, for example, occasional epenthesis even if the following word starts in a vowel, as in their native language (not[ɕi] really).

==== Romanian ====
Consonants

- Romanian doesn't have /ð/ and /θ/. They are often pronounced as [d] and [t], respectively.
- The letter r is often pronounced as the hard rhotic [r], as that is the only sound it makes in Romanian, even though a native English speaker would pronounce it as [ɹ]~[ɻ].
- The silent p before a consonant(e.g. in psychology or pterodactyl) is usually pronounced.
- "Ch" in the middle of words borrowed from Greek (usually making the [k] sound) such as "psychology", "technology" or "archaeology" is often pronounced /h/, as this is what the sound is in the Romanian equivalents

Vowels

- /ɪ/ and /iː/ are often pronounced [i] (ship and sheep are homophones).
- Romanian doesn't have the /æ/ and /ɛ/ sounds. They are often pronounced as [e]. However, speakers in some parts of Transylvania are usually familiar with Hungarian before learning English, and Hungarian does have /ɛ/, as such, they pronounce them as [ɛ].
- Romanian doesn't have the /ʌ/ sound. It is often pronounced as [a].
- /ʊ/ and /uː/ are often pronounced [u] (cook and kook are homophones).

==== Spanish ====
An excerpt of F. Scott Fitzgerald's The Great Gatsby as read in English by a person whose mother tongue is Spanish

Consonants

- Since Spanish does not make voicing contrasts between its fricatives (and its one affricate), speakers may neutralize contrasts between /s/ and /z/; likewise, fricatives may assimilate the voicing of a following consonant.
- Rhotic pronunciation, with /r/ pronounced as a trill [r] or a flap [ɾ].
- Cuban and Central American speakers tend to merge /tʃ/ with /ʃ/, and /dʒ, ʒ/ with /j/.
- /j/ and /w/ often have a fluctuating degree of closure.
- For the most part (especially in colloquial speech), Spanish allows only five (or six) word-final consonants: /θ/, /s/, /n/, /r/, /d/ and /l/; speakers may omit word-final consonants other than these, or alter them (for example, by turning /m/ to /n/ or /ŋ/).
- In Spanish, /s/ must immediately precede or follow a vowel; often a word beginning with [s] + consonant will acquire an epenthetic vowel (typically [e]) to make stomp pronounced [esˈtomp] rather than [stɒmp].
- In Spanish, the /θ/ phoneme exists only in (most dialects of) Spain; where this sound appears in English, speakers of other Spanish dialects replace /θ/ with /t/ or /s/.
- Speakers tend to merge /ð/ and /d/, pronouncing both as a plosive unless they occur in intervocalic position, in which case they are pronounced as a fricative. A similar process occurs with /v/ and /b/, because /v/ does not exist in Spanish.
- The three nasal phonemes of Spanish neutralize in coda-position; speakers may invariably pronounce nasal consonants as homorganic to a following consonant; if word-final (as in welcome) common realizations include [n], deletion with nasalization of the preceding vowel, or [ŋ].
- Devoicing of final consonants.

Vowels

- Vowel length confusions.
- Confusion of /æ/ /ɑ(ː)/ /ʌ/, usually realized as [a]
- Confusion of /ɪ/ /i(ː)/, usually realized as [i].
- Confusion of /ʊ/ /u(ː)/, usually realized as [u].
- Confusion of /ɔ(ː)/ /ɒ/, usually realized as [o].

Suprasegmental features

- Narrower pitch range, with emphasis marked with extra length instead of extra pitch variation.
- Problems with variable stress.

E.g. the blackbird. vs. the black bird.

- Problems with contrastive stress.

E.g. with sugar or without sugar?
(the second sugar is more heavily stressed)

=== Slavic languages (part of the Balto-Slavic branch) ===
==== Czech ====
These are the most common characteristics of the Czech pronunciation of English:

Consonants

- Final devoicing of voiced consonants (e.g. "bet" and "bed" are both pronounced [bɛt]), since non-sonorant consonants are always voiceless at the end of words in Czech. Some speakers may pronounce consonant-final English words with a strong vocalic offset, especially in isolated words (e.g. "dog" can be [ˈdɔɡə]).
- Czech /r/ is alveolar trill. There is a tendency to pronounce the trill in English and in all positions where ⟨r⟩ is written.
- Final -er (-or) pronounced as syllabic alveolar trill [r̩] (e.g. "water" sounds [ˈvɔːtr̩]). Stressed /ɜː/ tends to be realized as [ɛːr] (e.g. "bird" [bɛːrt]).
- Tendency to realize both /v/ and /w/ as [v], since /w/ does not exist in Czech.
- Tendency to pronounce the initial ⟨wr⟩ cluster as [vr] (e.g. "write" [vrajt]).
- Tendency to realize /θ/ as [s] or [f], since [θ] does not exist in Czech.
- Tendency to substitute /ð/ as [d] or [d͡z], since [ð] does not exist in Czech.
- Tendency to pronounce /h/ as voiced (e.g. "how" [ɦau̯]).
- Tendency not to aspirate the stops /p, t, tʃ, k/ (e.g. "keep" sounds [kiːp] instead of [kʰiːp]), since these stop consonants are not aspirated in Czech.
- Tendency to realise /ŋ/ as [ŋk] or [ŋɡ] (e.g. "singing" [ˈsɪŋɡɪŋk]), because Czech [ŋ] is an allophone of /n/ before velar stops.

Vowels

- /æ/ is often realised as [ɛ], so that "had" sounds like "head" [ɦɛt], homophonous with "hat".
- Schwa [ə] does not exist in Czech. Speakers tend to pronounce it as [ɛ] (e.g. "a table" [ɛ ˈtɛjbl̩]) or [a] (e.g. "China" [ˈt͡ʃajna]).

Suprasegmental features

- Tendency to isolate all words in speech, because the liaison is unusual in Czech. For instance, "see it" tends to be pronounced [siː ʔɪt], rather than [siː‿ɪt].
- The melody of the Czech language is not so strong as in English. Czech speakers may sound monotonous to an English ear.

==== Russian ====
Consonants

- There is no /w/ in Russian; speakers typically substitute [v].
- Native Russian speakers tend to produce an audible release for final consonants and in consonant clusters and are likely to transfer this to English speech, creating inappropriate releases of final bursts that sound overly careful and stilted and even causing native listeners to perceive extra unstressed syllables.
- Word-initial voiceless stops /p/, /t/, /k/ may not be aspirated by Russian speakers (following the pattern in Russian), which may sound to native English speakers as /b/, /d/, /g/ instead. However, at least one study challenges this, with Russian-accented English speakers in the study aspirating the voiceless consonants just as much as General American English speakers, and /t/ even more than General American speakers.
- Russian exhibits final-obstruent devoicing, which may also be used by speakers in English.
- Since there are no dental fricatives (/θ/ and /ð/) in Russian, speakers may pronounce them respectively as [s] or [f] or [t] and as [z] or [v] or [d].
- English /r/ is typically realised as a trill [r], the native Russian rhotic.
- Likewise, /h/ may be pronounced like its closest Russian equivalent, [x].
- Since there is no /ŋ/ in Russian, speakers typically produce [n] or [nɡ] instead.
- The voiced palato-alveolar affricate /d͡ʒ/ may be realised as a sequence of a stop and a fricative: [d] [ʐ].
- The voiceless palato-alveolar affricate /t͡ʃ/ may be pronounced as its closest Russian equivalent, /t͡ɕ/.
- The postalveolar fricatives /ʃ/ and /ʒ/ may be realised as their closest Russian equivalents, /ʂ/ and /ʐ/.
- The consonant cluster /t/ /s/ may be realised as an affricate, /t͡s/.
- The "clear" alveolar /l/ may be realised as Russian [l̪ˠ], sounding closer to English velarised [ɫ] (a.k.a. "dark l").
- Consonants written twice in English may be geminated by speakers.

Vowels

- Russian speakers may have difficulty distinguishing /iː/ and /ɪ/, /æ/ and /ɛ/, and /uː/ and /ʊ/; similarly, speakers' pronunciation of long vowels may sound more like their close counterpart (e.g. /ɑː/ may sound closer to /æ/)

== Examples from non-Indo-European languages ==
=== Sino-Tibetan ===
A pianist announces the piece Greensleeves; note emphasis on the e in 'transformed'

==== Cantonese ====
Consonants

- /ð/ tends to be [d], so this is [dis],

Vowels

- /ə/ tends to be [a], so whether is [ˈwɛda].
- There is less vowel reduction in unstressed syllables, and some variation in the placement of stress. For example, chocolate may be pronounced [ˈtʃɒkoʊleɪt] instead of [ˈtʃɒklɪt].

=== Uralic ===
==== Hungarian ====
Consonants

- The dental fricatives /θ/ and /ð/ may be realised as [s̻] and [d̪] respectively.
- Since Hungarian lacks the phoneme /w/, many Hungarian speakers substitute /v/ for /w/ when speaking in English. A less frequent practice is hypercorrection: substituting /w/ for /v/ in instances where the latter is actually correct.
- In Hungarian phonology, in obstruent clusters, retrograde voicing assimilation occurs, so voiced consonants change to their voiceless counterparts if a voiceless consonant follows them and voiceless consonants change to their voiced counterparts if a voiced consonant follows them. While in English, it's the other way around. e.g. pronouncing dropped as /drobd/ instead of /dɹɔpt/

Vowels

- The vowel in called /kɔːld/ and/or the vowel in cold /kəʊld/ may be replaced by Hungarian ó /oː/.
- The vowel in track /tɹæk/ and/or the vowel in trek /tɹɛk/ may be merged into Hungarian e /ɛ/.

=== Austronesian ===
==== Indonesian ====
The following are some characteristics of the English pronunciation by Indonesian speakers:

Consonants

- Merger of /θ/ and /ð/ into /t/ and /d/.
- Final-obstruent devoicing.

Vowels

- Difficulty with English vowels, including lack of vowel length.
  - /ɑː/ → [a]
  - /eɪ/ → [e]
- Common occurrence of unusual spelling pronunciations (e.g. eleven as [ɛlɛv(ə)n], cow as [koʊ], bite as [bitɛ] or even what as [wɛt]).

=== Japonic ===
==== Japanese ====
Consonants

- Speakers tend to confuse /l/ and /r/ both in perception and production, since the Japanese language has only one liquid phoneme /r/, whose possible realizations include central [ɾ] and lateral [l]. Speakers may also hear English /r/ as similar to the Japanese /w/.

Vowels

- Tendency to realize syllables containing unstressed central vowel /ə/ with a vowel based on the written form
- Tendency to insert a vowel, typically /o/ or /ɯ/, after consonants other than moraic nasal /ɴ/, as Japanese lacks syllable-final consonants.

Suprasegmental features

- Tendency to reanalyze English words according to moraic timing and/or pitch accent, leading to unnatural stress/timing

=== Austroasiatic ===
==== Vietnamese ====
Note: There are three main dialects of Vietnamese, a northern one centered on Hanoi, a central one centered on Huế, and a southern one centered on Ho Chi Minh City.

Consonants

- Speakers may not produce final consonants since there are fewer final consonants in Vietnamese and those that do exist differ in their phonetic quality:
  - Final /b/ /f/ /v/ is likely to be confused with /p/.
  - Final /d/ is likely to be confused with /t/.
  - Final /s/ /ʃ/ /z/ /tʃ/ is likely to be omitted.
  - Final /l/ is likely to be confused with /n/, but some Vietnamese pronounce the word bell as [ɓɛu̯].
  - Final /t/ is likely to be confused with /k/ by southern Vietnamese.
- Speakers also have difficulty with English consonant clusters, with segments being omitted or epenthetic vowels being inserted.
- Speakers may not aspirate initial /p/, /t/, /k/ and /tʃ/, native English-speakers think that they pronounce as /d/ and /ɡ/. For example, when Vietnamese people pronounced the word tie, native English-speakers think that they say the word die or dye.
- Speakers often have difficulty with and confuse the following phonemes, which in some cases may depend on where in Vietnam they are originally from:
  - /θ/ with /t/, /s/.
  - /ð/ with /d/, /z/.
  - /p/ with /b/ (especially in southern dialects).
  - /ɡ/ with /k/.
  - /dʒ/ with /z/.
  - /ʒ/ with /z/ or /dʒ/.
  - /s/ with /ʃ/ by northern Vietnamese.
  - /tr/ with /dʒ/, /tʃ/, or /t/ by northern Vietnamese.
  - /v/ with /j/ by southern Vietnamese.

Vowels

- Speakers often have difficulty with and confuse the following phonemes, which in some cases may depend on where in Vietnam they are originally from:
  - /ɪ/ with /iː/.
  - /ʊ/ with /uː/ or /ʌ/.
  - /æ/ with /ɑː/.

Suprasegmental features

- Vietnamese being a tonal language, speakers might try to apply the Vietnamese tonal system or use a mid tone with English words. However, they produce a high tone when the closed syllable is followed by /p, t, k/. They may also associate tones with the intonational pattern of a sentence and become confused by inflectional changes.

=== Afroasiatic ===
==== Semitic ====
===== Arabic =====
General features among most or all Arabic speakers:

====== Consonants ======
- Speakers tend to speak with a rhotic accent and pronounce /ɹ/ as [ɾ] or [r].
- There is struggle in pronouncing /ŋ/ alone in its final position; the "ing" syllable. It is often immediately related to the /g/ sound, like in: "waiting" /ˈweɪtɪŋg/ instead of /ˈweɪtɪŋ/ and "something" /sʌm.θɪŋg/ instead of /sʌm.θɪŋ/.
- A study conducted with 45 subjects from Egypt, Libya and Saudi Arabia found that speakers had difficulty in pronouncing some English consonants such as /p/, /v/, /ŋ/, dark /ƚ/.

====== Vowels ======
- Confusion between /ɪ/ as in sit /sɪt/ and /ɛ/ as in set /sɛt/, pronouncing both vowels as [ɪ], [e̞], or [ɛ].
- Difficulty distinguishing low sounds, /æ/ as in bam and /ɑː/ as in balm may both be realized as [aː], [æː], or [ɑː] depending on the speaker's dialect.
- Confusion between /ɔː/ as in called and caught with /oʊ/ as in cold and coat, both being realized as [oː] or [o̞ː] depending on the speaker's dialect.

===== Hebrew =====
====== Consonants ======
- The dental fricatives /ð/ (as in "the") and /θ/ (as in "think") are often mispronounced.
- Hebrew speakers may confuse /w/ and /v/.

====== Vowels ======
- The lack of discrimination in Hebrew between tense and lax vowels makes correctly pronouncing English words such as hit/heat and cook/kook difficult.

====== Suprasegmental features ======
- In Hebrew, word stress is usually on the last (ultimate) or penultimate syllable of a word; speakers may carry their stress system into English, which has a much more varied stress system. Hebrew speakers may also use Hebrew intonation patterns which mark them as foreign speakers of English.

== See also ==
- Anglophone pronunciation of foreign languages
- Pronunciation of English ⟨th⟩
- Non-native speech database
- International Dialects of English Archive
- Accent reduction
- Koiné language
- Shibboleth
- English prosody

== Bibliography ==
- Al Saqqaf, Abdullah; Vaddapalli, Maruthi (2012), "Teaching English vowels to Arab students: A search for a model and pedagogical implications", International Journal of English and Literature, 2 (2): 46–56
- Cheung, Karen (2 September 2015), "10 English Pronunciation Errors by Greek Speakers", Pronunciation Studio
- Collins, Beverly; Mees, Inger M. (2003), The Phonetics of English and Dutch (5th ed.), Leiden: Brill, ISBN 978-90-04-10340-5
- Hwa-Froelich, Deborah; Hodson, Barbara W; Edwards, Harold T (2003), "Characteristics of Vietnamese Phonology", American Journal of Speech-Language Pathology, 11 (3): 264–273, doi:10.1044/1058-0360(2002/031)
- Goldstein, Brian; Fabiano, Leah; Washington, Patricia Swasey (2005), "Phonological Skills in Predominantly English-Speaking, Predominantly Spanish-Speaking, and Spanish–English Bilingual Children", Language, Speech, and Hearing Services in Schools, 36 (3): 201–218, doi:10.1044/0161-1461(2005/021), PMID 16175884, S2CID 15933169
- Goto, Hiromu (1971), "Auditory perception by normal Japanese adults of the sounds "l" and "r""", Neuropsychologia, 9 (3): 317–323, doi:10.1016/0028-3932(71)90027-3, PMID 5149302
- Gut, Ulrike (2009), Non-native speech. A corpus-based analysis of phonological and phonetic properties of L2 English and German., Frankfurt: Peter Lang
- Hallé, Pierre A.; Best, Catherine T.; Levitt, Andrea (1999), "Phonetic vs. phonological influences on French listeners' perception of American English approximants", Journal of Phonetics, 27 (3): 281–306, doi:10.1006/jpho.1999.0097
- Jeffers, Robert J.; Lehiste, Ilse (1979), Principles and Methods for Historical Linguistics, MIT press, ISBN 978-0-262-60011-8
- Khattab, Ghada (2002), "/r/ production in English and Arabic bilingual and monolingual speakers", in Nelson, Diane (ed.), Leeds Working Papers in Linguistics and Phonetics, vol. 9, pp. 91–129
- Kovács, János; Siptár, Péter (2006), A-Z angol kiejtés, Budapest: Corvina Kiadó, ISBN 978-963-13-5557-4
- LaCharité, Darlene; Prévost, Philippe (1999), "The Role of L1 and of Teaching in the Acquisition of English Sounds by Francophones", in Greenhill, Annabel; Tano, Cheryl; Littlefield, Heather (eds.), Proceedings of the 23rd Annual Boston University Conference on Language Development, vol. 2, Somerville, Massachusetts: Cascadilla Press, pp. 373–385
- MacDonald, Marguerite (1989), "The influence of Spanish phonology on the English spoken by United States Hispanics", in Bjarkman, Peter; Hammond, Robert (eds.), American Spanish pronunciation: Theoretical and applied perspectives, Washington, D.C.: Georgetown University Press, pp. 215–236, ISBN 978-0-87840-493-3
- Melen, Dušan (2010). Výslovnost angličtiny na pozadí češtiny (in Czech). Praha: Big Ben Bookshop Prague. pp. 71–75. ISBN 978-80-904306-2-4.
- Munro, Miles; Mann, Virginia (2005), "Age of immersion as a predictor of foreign accent", Applied Psycholinguistics, 26 (3): 311–341, doi:10.1017/S0142716405050198
- Nádasdy, Ádám (2006), Background to English Pronunciation, Budapest: Nemzeti Tankönyvkiadó, ISBN 978-963-19-5791-4
- Paradis, Carole; LaCharité, Darlene (2001), "Guttural deletion in loanwords", Phonology, 18 (2): 255–300, doi:10.1017/S0952675701004079, S2CID 61325971
- Paradis, Carole; LaCharité, Darlene (2012), "The Influence of Attitude on the Treatment of Interdentals in Loanwords: Ill-performed Importations", Catalan Journal of Linguistics, 11 (11): 97–126, doi:10.5565/rev/catjl.12
- Ravid, Dorit (1995), Language Change in Child and Adult Hebrew: A Psycholinguistic Perspective, Oxford University Press, ISBN 978-0-19-508893-9
- Shoebottom, Paul (2007), "The differences between English and Hebrew", Frankfurt International School, archived from the original on 2013-11-06
- Swan, Michael (2001). Learner English: A Teacher's Guide to Interference and Other Problems, Volume 1. Cambridge University Press. ISBN 978-0-521-77939-5.
- Thompson, Irene (1991), "Foreign Accents Revisited: The English Pronunciation of Russian Immigrants", Language Learning, 41 (2): 177–204, doi:10.1111/j.1467-1770.1991.tb00683.x
