= Accent (sociolinguistics) =

Distinctive way of pronouncing a language

In sociolinguistics, an accent is a way of pronouncing a language that is distinctive to a country, area, social class, or individual. An accent may be identified with the locality in which its speakers reside (a regional or geographical accent), the socioeconomic status of its speakers, their ethnicity (an ethnolect), their caste or social class (a social accent), or influence from their first language (a foreign accent).

Accents typically differ in quality of voice, pronunciation and distinction of vowels and consonants, stress, and prosody. Although grammar, semantics, vocabulary, and other language characteristics often vary concurrently with accent, the word "accent" may refer specifically to the differences in pronunciation, whereas the word "dialect" encompasses the broader set of linguistic differences. "Accent" is often a subset of "dialect".

== History ==
As human beings spread out into isolated communities, stresses and peculiarities develop. Over time, they can develop into identifiable accents. In North America, the interaction of people from many ethnic backgrounds contributed to the formation of the different varieties of North American accents. It is difficult to measure or predict how long it takes an accent to form. Accents from Canada, South Africa, Australia and the United States for example, developed from the combinations of different accents and languages in various societies and their effect on the various pronunciations of British settlers.

Accents may vary within regions of an area in which a uniform language is spoken. In some cases, such as regional accents of English in the United States, accents can be traced back to when an area was settled and by whom. Areas like the city of New Orleans in Louisiana that are, or at one point in time were, semi-isolated have distinct accents due to the absence of contact between regions. Isolated regions allow dialects to expand and evolve independently. Social and economic factors can also influence the way people speak.

== Development ==
During the early period of rapid cognitive development in a child's life, it is much easier to develop and master foreign skills such as learning a new (or first) language. Verbal cues are processed and silently learned in preparation for the day the vocal system is developed enough to speak its first words (usually around 12 months). Before infants can identify words, they just hear "sounds" that they come to recognize. Eventually neural pathways are established in the brain that link each sound with a meaning. The more frequently a word is heard, the more its connection is solidified and the same goes for accents. There is no "standard" accent for the child to practice; as far as they are concerned, the accent they hear from their parents is not the "right" way but the only way. Eventually children graduate from the conscious act of recalling each word, and it becomes natural, like breathing. As children grow up, they learn vocabulary of the language they are immersed in, whether assisted by parents or not. However, their first few encounters with words determine the way they will pronounce them for the rest of their lives. This is how accents are cultivated in groups as small as towns and as large as countries; it is a compounding effect. Though it is possible to develop a new accent or lose an old one, it is difficult because the neural pathways created when learning the language were developed with the "original" pronunciations.

Children are able to take on accents relatively quickly. Children of immigrant families, for example, generally have a pronunciation more similar to people native to where they live compared to their parents, but both children and parents may have an accent noticeably differing from local people. Accents seem to remain relatively malleable until a person's early twenties, after which a person's accent seems to become more entrenched.

Nonetheless, accents are not fixed, even in adulthood. An acoustic analysis by Jonathan Harrington of Elizabeth II's Royal Christmas Messages revealed that the speech patterns of even so conservative a figure as a monarch can continue to change over her lifetime.

== Non-native accents ==
Accents of non-native speakers may be the result of the speaker's native language. Each language contains distinct sets of sounds. At around 12 months, human infants will pick out which sounds they need to learn their language. As they get older, it becomes increasingly harder to learn these "forgotten" sounds. A prime example of this can be seen between German and English: the "w" and "th" sounds, like in the English words "wish" and "this" respectively, do not exist in German (the closest sounds are "v" because a German “w” is rendered as a “v”, and "z" because the “th” sounds do not exist in German). As a result, many English-speaking Germans pronounce "wish" as "vish" and "this" as "zis". A similar disjunction occurs in German-speaking native English speakers, who may find it difficult to pronounce the vowels in German words such as "schön" (beautiful) and "müde" (tired).

An important factor in predicting the degree to which the accent will be noticeable (or strong) is the age at which the non-native language was learned. The critical period theory states that if learning takes place after the critical period (usually considered around puberty) for acquiring native-like pronunciation, an individual is unlikely to acquire a native-like accent. This theory, however, is controversial among researchers. Although many subscribe to some form of the critical period, they either place it earlier than puberty or consider it more of a critical window, which may vary from one individual to another and depend on factors other than age, such as length of residence, similarity of the non-native language to the native language, and the frequency with which both languages are used.

Nevertheless, children as young as 6 at the time of moving to another country often speak with a noticeable non-native accent as adults. There are also rare instances of individuals who are able to pass for native speakers even if they learned their non-native language in early adulthood. However, neurological constraints associated with brain development appear to limit most non-native speakers' ability to sound native-like. Most researchers agree that for most adults, acquiring a native-like accent in a non-native language is near impossible.

== Social factors ==
When a group defines a standard pronunciation, speakers who deviate from it are often said to "speak with an accent". However, everyone speaks with an accent. People from the United States would "speak English with an accent" from the point of view of an Australian, and vice versa. Accents such as Received Pronunciation or General American English may sometimes be erroneously designated in their countries of origin as "accentless" to indicate that they offer no obvious clue to the speaker's regional or social background.

Accents are an important dimension of social identity, both individual and communal, due to their ability to identify group or community belonging. One's accent can showcase their class, religion or sexual orientation.

=== Being understood ===
Many teachers of English as a second language for example neglect teaching speech and pronunciation. Many adult and near-adult learners of second languages have unintelligible speech patterns that may interfere with their education, profession, and social interactions. Pronunciation in a second or foreign language involves more than the correct articulation of individual sounds. It involves producing a wide range of complex and subtle distinctions which relate sound to meaning at several levels.

Teaching of speech/pronunciation is neglected in part because of the following myths:

- Pronunciation is not important: "This is patently false from any perspective." Speech/Pronunciation forms the vehicle for transmitting the speaker's meaning. If the listener does not understand the message, no communication takes place, and although there are other factors involved, one of the most important is the intelligibility of the speaker's pronunciation.
- Students will pick it up on their own: "Some will learn to pronounce the second language intelligibly; many will not."

Inadequate instruction in speech/pronunciation can result in a complete breakdown in communication. The proliferation of commercial "accent reduction" services is seen as a sign that many ESL teachers are not meeting their students' needs for speech/pronunciation instruction.

The goals of speech/pronunciation instruction should include: to help the learner speak in a way that is easy to understand and does not distract the listener, to increase the self-confidence of the learner, and to develop the skills to self-monitor and adapt one's own speech.

Even when the listener does understand the speaker, the presence of an accent that is difficult to understand can produce anxiety in the listener that he will not understand what comes next, and cause him to end the conversation earlier or avoid difficult topics. "In speech the perceptual salience of the accent overrides other measures of competence and performance," wrote Ingrid Piller.

Intelligibility of speech, in comparison to native-like accent, has been experimentally reported to be of greater importance for the second language speakers. As such ways of increasing intelligibility of speech has been recommended by some researchers within the field. A strong accent does not necessarily impede intelligibility despite common perceptions.

=== Prestige ===
Certain accents, particularly those of European heritage, are perceived to carry more prestige in a society than other accents, such that some speakers may as a result consciously adopt them. This is often due to their association with the elite part of society. For example, in the United Kingdom, Received Pronunciation of the English language is associated with the traditional upper class. The same can be said about the predominance of Southeastern Brazilian accents in the case of the Brazilian variant of the Portuguese language, especially considering the disparity of prestige between most caipira-influenced speech, associated with rural environment and lack of formal education, together with the Portuguese spoken in some other communities of lower socioeconomic strata such as favela dwellers, and other sociocultural variants such as middle and upper class paulistano (dialect spoken from Greater São Paulo to the East) and fluminense (dialect spoken in the state of Rio de Janeiro) to the other side, inside Southeastern Brazil itself.

The goal of linguistics with respect to accents is to catalogue them and to track, explain, and, occasionally, predict their evolution. In the process, linguistics recognizes that the assignment of differing levels of prestige, aesthetic merit, and/or "standardness" by different sectors of society to different accents influences the evolution of those accents. However, linguistics, at least in its ideal form, does not itself participate in making those normative assessments and comparisons. In turn, it does not pass judgment about whether societally performed normative judgments are accurate, in part because doing so would require the independent performance and articulation of normative judgments when setting and promulgating standards against which to assess normative judgments by sectors of society.

=== Accent stereotyping and discrimination ===
Negative perceptions of accents, the basis of which may relate to the speaker's social identity, can manifest as stereotyping, harassment or employment discrimination.

Researchers consistently show that people with non-native accents are judged as less intelligent, less competent, less educated, having poor English/language skills, and unpleasant to listen to. Not only people with standard accents subscribe to these beliefs and attitudes, but individuals with accents also often stereotype against their own or others' accents. Research demonstrates that an average listener is adept at detecting an accent typical of a language differing from their own.

Accents have even found to be more impactful on perception of babies than known perceptual dividers like race, religion, or sex. In a PNAS study, babies were told to choose a toy from two recorded speakers with varying characteristics. Ahead of all variables tested, including race and gender, recordings speaking with an accent native to the child were selected at a considerably higher frequency.

Unlike other forms of discrimination, there are no strong norms against accent discrimination in the general society. Rosina Lippi-Green writes,

Accent serves as the first point of gate keeping because we are forbidden, by law and social custom, and perhaps by a prevailing sense of what is morally and ethically right, from using race, ethnicity, homeland or economics more directly. We have no such compunctions about language, thus, accent becomes a litmus test for exclusion, and excuse to turn away, to recognize the other.

In the English speaking world, speakers with certain accents often experience discrimination in housing and employment. For example, speakers who have foreign or ethnic-minority accents are less likely to be called back by landlords and are more likely to be assigned by employers to lower status positions than those with standard accents. In business settings, individuals with non-standard accents are more likely to be evaluated negatively. Accent discrimination is also present in educational institutions. For example, non-native speaking graduate students, lecturers, and professors, across college campuses in the US have been targeted for being unintelligible because of accent. Second language speakers have reported being discriminated against, or feeling marginalized for, when they attempted to find a job in higher ranking positions mainly because of their accents. On average, however, students taught by non-native English speakers do not underperform when compared to those taught by native speakers of English. Some English native-speaker students in Canada reported a preference for non-native speaker instructors as long as the instructor's speech is intelligible. This was due to the psychological impacts such circumstances has on the students requiring them to pay closer attention to the instructor to ensure they understand them.

Studies have shown the perception of the accent, not the accent by itself, often results in negative evaluations of speakers. In a study conducted by Rubin (1992), students listened to a taped lecture recorded by a native English speaker with a standard accent. They were then shown an image of the "lecturer", sometimes Asian-looking, sometimes white. Participants in the study who saw the Asian picture believed that they had heard an accented lecturer and performed worse on a task that measured lecture comprehension. Negative evaluations may reflect the prejudices rather than real issues with understanding accents.

=== Legal implications ===
In the United States, Title VII of the Civil Rights Act of 1964 prohibits discrimination based on national origin, implying accents. However, employers may claim that a person's accent impairs their communication skills that are necessary to the effective business operation. The courts often rely on the employer's claims or use judges' subjective opinions when deciding whether the (potential) employee's accent would interfere with communication or performance, without any objective proof that accent was or might be a hindrance.

Kentucky's highest court in the case of Clifford vs. Commonwealth held that a white police officer, who had not seen the black defendant allegedly involved in a drug transaction, could, nevertheless, identify him as a participant by saying that a voice on an audiotape "sounded black". The police officer based this "identification" on the fact that the defendant was the only African American man in the room at the time of the transaction and that an audio-tape contained the voice of a man the officer said "sounded black" selling crack cocaine to a European American informant planted by the police.

=== Acting and accents ===
Actors are often called upon to speak a language variety other than their own. For instance, an actor may portray a character of some nationality other than their own by adopting into their native language the phonological profile typical of the nationality to be portrayed, in what is commonly known as "speaking with an accent".

Accents may have stereotypical associations in entertainment. For example, in Disney animated films, mothers and fathers typically speak with White, middle-class American or English accents. On another note, English accents in Disney animated films are frequently employed for one of two purposes: slapstick comedy and the portrayal of evil geniuses. Examples of this can be seen in characters from the films Aladdin (the Sultan and Jafar, respectively) and The Lion King (Zazu and Scar, respectively), among others.

== See also ==
- Accent reduction
- Accent perception
- Brogue (accent)
- English-language accents in film
- Foreign accent syndrome
- Human voice
- Language change
- Non-native pronunciations of English
- Regional accents of English
- Variety (linguistics)
- Koiné language
