= Hicks =

Hicks, also spelled Hickes, is a surname.

== Surname ==
=== A ===
- Aaron Hicks (born 1989), American professional baseball center fielder
- Adam Hicks (born 1992), American actor, rapper, singer, and songwriter
- Akiem Hicks (born 1989), American football defensive end
- Albert W. Hicks (1820–1860), American triple murderer, and one of the last persons executed for piracy in the US
- Aline Elizabeth Black Hicks (1906–1974), African-American schoolteacher who filed a salary discrimination case
- Amy Hicks (1877–1953), American suffragist
- Andrew Hicks (cricketer) (born 1988), Papua New Guinean cricketer
- Andy Hicks (born 1973), English snooker player
- Angelica Hicks (born 1992), British illustrator
- Anthony Hicks (1943–2010), Welsh musicologist, music critic, editor, and writer
- Artis Hicks, American football player
- Ashley Hicks (born 1963), British interior designer

=== B ===
- Baptist Hicks, 1st Viscount Campden (1551–1629), English politician
- Barbara Hicks, British actress
- Beatrice Hicks, American engineer
- Benjamin Hicks (politician), 18th-century New York assemblyman
- Betty Hicks, American golfer
- Bill Hicks (1961–1994), American comedian
- Bill Hicks (American football) (born 1940), head football coach for the Howard Payne University Yellow Jackets
- Bill Hicks (footballer) (1899–1962), Australian rules footballer who played with Fitzroy in the Victorian Football League
- Billy Hicks (1927–2016), American moving target shooter
- Bobby Hicks (1933–2024), American bluegrass fiddler and professional musician
- Bonny Hicks (1968–1997), Singaporean model and novelist
- Brandon Hicks, professional baseball player

=== C ===
- Cardie Hicks, American former basketball player
- Catherine Hicks, American actress
- Chakowby Hicks, American basketball player
- Charles R. Hicks (1767–1827), one of the most important Cherokee leaders in the early 19th century
- Chris Hicks (rugby league), Australian rugby league footballer
- Chris Hicks (record executive), American record company executive
- Chris Hicks (rugby league), Australian former professional rugby league footballer
- Chuck Hicks, American actor and stuntman
- C. J. Hicks (born 2003), American football player
- Clifford Hicks (disambiguation), multiple people
- Courtney Hicks (born 1995), American figure skater
- Curry Hicks (1885–1964), American football coach, athletic director, and professor of physical education

=== D ===
- Dan Hicks (disambiguation), several people
- David Hicks (disambiguation), various people
- Dolores Hicks (born 1938), American better known under stage name Dolores Hart, former actress who joined convent and became a nun
- Doug Hicks, Canadian hockey player
- Dwight Hicks, American football player
- Dwone Hicks, American football player
- Dylan Hicks, American musician and singer-songwriter

=== E ===
- Edna Hicks, American blues musician
- Edward Hicks (1780–1849), American Quaker and naive painter
- Edward Hicks (bishop) (1843–1919), British Anglican author and Bishop of Lincoln
- Edward Hicks (Wisconsin pioneer) (1818–1873), American politician in Wisconsin
- Emmett R. Hicks (1854–1925), American lawyer
- Edwin Hicks (1830–1902), New York politician
- Elias Hicks (1748–1830), American Quaker minister
- Elijah Hicks (born 1999), American football player
- Eric Hicks (disambiguation), several people
- Esther Hicks, American medium and motivational speaker

=== F ===
- Faion Hicks (born 2000), American football player
- Frederick Hicks (disambiguation), several people

=== G ===
- George Hickes (disambiguation), several people
- George Hicks (disambiguation), several people
- Granville Hicks (1901–1982)
- Greg Hicks (born 1953), English actor

==== H ====
- Hannah Hicks (born 1991), British table tennis player
- Helen Hicks, American golfer
- Henry Hicks (disambiguation), several people
- Hilly Hicks, American actor
- Hinda Hicks, British singer
- Hope Hicks (born 1988), American public relations executive and former White House publicity czar under Trump

==== I ====
- India Hicks, British fashion model, daughter of Lady Pamela Hicks

=== J ===
- Jack Hicks, constructionist steel sculptor
- Jaden Hicks (born 2002), American football player
- Jessie Hicks (born 1971), American former professional basketball player
- Jim Hicks (1940–2020), American professional baseball player
- Jodie Hicks (born 1997), Australian rules footballer
- John Hickes (politician) (fl. 1380–1388), English politician and spicer
- John Hickes (minister) (1633–1685), English nonconformist minister
- John Hicks (disambiguation), several people
- Jon Hicks (disambiguation), several people
- Jordan Hicks (born 1992), American football middle linebacker
- Jordan Hicks (baseball) (born 1996), American professional baseball pitcher
- Jose Luis Romero Hicks, Mexican politician
- Joshua Hicks (born 1991), Australian rower
- Juan Carlos Romero Hicks, Mexican politician

=== K ===
- Karen Hicks, American Democratic Party operative
- Katherine Hicks, Australian actress
- Kevin Hicks (disappeared 1986), English missing schoolboy

==== L ====
- Lancelot Hickes (1884–1965), Second World War British Army major-general
- Larry R. Hicks (born 1943), American Senior United States District Judge of the United States District Court for the District of Nevada
- Larry S. Hicks, Republican member of the Wyoming Senate, representing the 11th district since 2011
- Laurence Henry Hicks (1912–1997), Australian composer
- Liam Hicks (born 1999), Canadian baseball player
- Louise Day Hicks (1916–2003), American politician and lawyer

=== M ===
- Margaret Hicks, artist of miniatures
- Margaret Hicks (architect), American architect
- Martin Hicks (born 1957), English former football defender
- Maurice Hicks, American football player
- Merv Hicks, Welsh rugby league footballer
- Michael Hicks (disambiguation), several people
- Michele Hicks (born 1948), English actress

=== N ===
- Nat Hicks (1845–1907), an American baseball player who was the first catcher to stand behind the batter
- Nicola Hicks (born 1960), English sculptor

=== P ===
- Lady Pamela Hicks (1929–2026), daughter of Louis Mountbatten
- Phil Hicks (born 1953), American former basketball player

=== R ===
- Ramón Hicks (born 1959), Paraguayan former football winger
- Ratcliffe Hicks (1843–1906), American industrialist and state legislator
- René Hicks, American comedian
- Reni Hicks (born 1998), Australian rules footballer
- Robert Hicks (disambiguation), several people
- Ron Hicks, American politician from Missouri
- Ronald Aldon Hicks (born 1967), American Roman Catholic prelate, Archbishop of New York
- Rosalind Hicks, British literary guardian and only child of author Agatha Christie
- Russell Hicks (1895–1957), American film actor

==== S ====
- Scott Hicks (basketball) (born 1966), American former college basketball coach
- Scott Hicks (director), Australian film director
- Seymour Hicks, English actor/manager
- Sheila Hicks, American textile artist
- Skilyr Hicks, American musical artist
- Skip Hicks, American football player
- Stephen Hicks (born 1960), Canadian-American philosopher
- Stuart Hicks (born 1967), English former professional football defender

==== T ====
- Taral Hicks, American singer and actress
- Taylor Hicks, American singer
- Thomas Hicks (disambiguation), several people named Thomas or Tom
- Tim Hicks, American singer
- Tim Hicks (American football), American football player
- Tony Hicks (born 1945), guitarist, singer and songwriter of The Hollies

==== V ====
- Victor Hicks, American football player

==== W ====
- Whitehead Hicks, the 42nd mayor of New York City, from 1766 to 1776
- William Hicks (disambiguation), several people called Bill or William

==== Z ====
- Zachary Hickes (1739–1771), Royal Navy lieutenant, second-in-command on James Cook's first voyage of discovery to the Pacific

== Fictional characters ==
- Brian Hicks, a private military contractor in the game Army of Two
- Billy Hicks, a character in St. Elmo's Fire
- Chick Hicks, an anthropomorphic race car from Pixar's animated feature film Cars
- Dante Hicks, in the films Clerks and Clerks II
- Corporal Dwayne Hicks, United States Colonial Marine in the movie Aliens
- Gilly Hicks, fictional founder of the Abercrombie & Fitch brand of the same name
- Steve Hicks, one of the title characters in the 2005 American romantic comedy movie Adam & Steve

== See also ==
- General Hicks (disambiguation)
- Judge Hicks (disambiguation)
- Senator Hicks (disambiguation)
- Lancelot Joynson-Hicks, 3rd Viscount Brentford, British politician
- Paula Hicks-Hudson (born 1951), American politician
- Peggy Glanville-Hicks (1912–1990), Australian composer
- Hix (disambiguation)
