= Higgs =

Higgs may refer to:

== Physics ==
- Higgs boson, an elementary particle
- Higgs factory, a proposed particle accelerator
- Higgs field, a quantum field
- Higgs field (classical)
- Higgs mechanism, an explanation for electroweak symmetry breaking
- Higgs phase
- Higgs sector

== Mathematics ==
- Higgs bundle, a vector bundle
- Higgs prime, a class of prime numbers

== People ==
- Alan Higgs (died 1979), English businessman and philanthropist
- Alf Higgs (born 1904), Welsh rugby league footballer
- Alfred Higgs (sprinter) (born 1991), Bahamian sprinter
- Amanda Higgs, Australian television producer, writer and executive
- Anna Higgs, English film producer
- Avis Higgs (1918–2016), New Zealand textile designer and painter
- Blaine Higgs (born 1954), Canadian politician; Premier of New Brunswick
- Blake Alphonso Higgs (1915–1986), Bahamian singer and musician
- Cecil Higgs (1898–1986), South African artist
- Colleen Higgs (born 1962), South African writer and publisher
- David Higgs, American organist
- Denis Higgs (1929–2011), English mathematician
- Derek Higgs (1944–2008), English business leader and merchant banker, son of Alan Higgs
- Devon Higgs (born 2000), American basketball player
- Douglas Higgs (born 1951), British haematologist
- Dustin Higgs (1972–2021), American convicted murderer
- Eric Higgs (disambiguation), various people
- George Higgs (1930–2013), American Piedmont blues musician
- Godfrey Higgs (1907–1986), Bahamian sailor
- Griffin Higgs (1589–1659), English churchman
- Harry Higgs (born 1991), American golfer
- Helen Burns Higgs (1897–1983), Bahamian writer, journalist and botanical illustrator
- Henry Higgs (1864–1940), English civil servant, economist and historian of economic thought
- Henry Marcellus Higgs (also known as H.M. Higgs) (1855–1929), English composer and music arranger
- Hubert Higgs (1911–1992), Anglican Bishop of Hull
- Jake Higgs (born 1975), Canadian curler
- James Higgs (1829–1902), English organist and teacher, uncle of Henry Marcellus Higgs
- Jess Higgs (born 1989), Australian singer also known as George Maple
- Jim Higgs (born 1950), Australian former cricketer
- Joe Higgs (1940–1999), Jamaican singer and musician
- John Higgs (born 1970s), English writer, novelist, journalist
- Jonathan Higgs (born 1985), English singer-songwriter and musician
- Ken Higgs (1937–2016), English cricketer
- Ken Higgs (Canadian football) (1930–2002), Canadian football player
- Kenneth Higgs (1886–1959), English cricketer
- Kenny Higgs (born 1955), American retired basketball player, brother of Mark Higgs
- Lesley Higgs (born 1965), English footballer
- Mark Higgs (born 1966), American football player who played in the National Football League, brother of Kenny Higgs
- Mark Higgs (cricketer) (born 1976), Australian cricketer
- Mary Higgs (1854–1937), British writer and social reformer
- Matthew Higgs (born 1964), English artist, curator, writer and publisher
- Michael Higgs (born 1962), English actor
- Michael Higgs (politician) (1912–1995), British Member of Parliament
- Mike Higgs, British comic book artist, writer, designer, and editor
- Montague Higgs (1939–2006), Bahamian sailor
- Nate Higgs (born 1970), American/Spanish basketball player and coach
- Nick Higgs, English businessman and football club chairman
- Peter Higgs (1929–2024), British physicist and Nobel Prize laureate, namesake of the Higgs boson particle
- Ray Higgs (born 1950), Australian rugby league footballer
- Raymond Higgs (born 1991), Bahamian long jumper
- Rebekah Higgs (born 1982), Canadian singer
- Robert Higgs (born 1944), American economist
- Robert W. Higgs (born 1957), South African admiral
- Russell Shaw Higgs (born 1960), British artist and political activist
- Shane Higgs (born 1977), English footballer
- Suzanne Higgs, English psychologist
- Teddy Higgs (died 1950), British tennis player
- Tracy Higgs (born 1970), British psychic and television personality
- Walter Higgs (1886–1961), British Member of Parliament
- William Higgs (disambiguation), various people

== Fictional characters ==
- Higgs, narrator in the 1872 novel Erewhon by Samuel Butler
- John Higgs, a silent character in The Archers on BBC Radio 4
- Higgs Monaghan, an antagonist in Hideo Kojima's 2019 video game Death Stranding

== See also ==
- HIG (disambiguation)
