= Hicks (disambiguation) =

Hicks is a surname.

Hicks may also refer to:

== Places ==
=== United States ===
- Hicks, Louisiana, an unincorporated community
- Hicks, Ohio, an unincorporated community
- Hicks City, Missouri, an unincorporated community
- Mount Hicks (Nevada)
- Hicks Creek (Santa Clara County), California
- Hicks Creek (Susquehanna River tributary), Luzerne County, Pennsylvania
- Hicks Creek (Texas), Bandera County
- Hicks Island (New York)
- Hicks Lake, Washington

=== Elsewhere ===
- Hicks Island, Australia
- Mount Hicks (Antarctica)
- Mount Hicks (New Zealand)

== Other uses ==
- Hicks baronets, two titles in the Baronetage of England, one extant
- Lew Moren (1883–1966), American Major League Baseball pitcher nicknamed "Hicks"
- HM Capital Partners, a private US equity firm, formerly "Hicks, Muse, Tate & Furst"

== See also ==
- Hick's Cayes, Belize, a group of uninhabited islands
- Hick's law, in psychology
- Hicks' yew, a conifer
- Hick (disambiguation)
- Higgs (disambiguation)
