= Mount Hicks =

Mount Hicks can refer to these mountains:

- Mount Hicks (Antarctica)
- Mount Hicks (New Zealand), 3216 m
- Mount Hicks (Nevada), United States, 2857 m
- Lower Mount Hicks, Tasmania, Australia, 88 m

== Places ==
- Mount Hicks, Tasmania, a locality in Tasmania, Australia
