= Hick =

Hick is a surname or a nickname. Notable people with the name include:

== Surname ==
- Andrew Hick (born 1971), Australian rugby league footballer
- Benjamin Hick (1790–1842), English civil and mechanical engineer
- Bruce Hick (born 1963), Australian rower
- Graeme Hick (born 1966), English cricketer
- Jacqueline Hick (1919–2004), Australian painter
- Jochen Hick (born 1960), German film director
- John Hick (MP) (1815–1894), English MP, civil and mechanical engineer
- John Hick (1922–2012), philosopher of religion and theologian
- Les Hick (1927–1971), English footballer
- Pentland Hick (1919–2016), British entrepreneur, author, and publisher
- Rarriwuy Hick (born 1990/1991), Australian actress
- W. E. Hick (1912–1974), British psychologist

== Nickname ==
- Hick Cady (1886–1946), baseball player
- Hick Carpenter (1855–1937), baseball player
- The Hick from French Lick (born 1956), Larry Bird, basketball player
- Lorena "Hick" Hickok (1893–1968), American journalist

== Other uses ==
- Hick: The Trailblazing Journalist Who Captured Eleanor Roosevelt's Heart, 2025 biography of Lorena Hickok by Sarah Miller
- Hick, another term for the derogatory term redneck

== See also ==
- Hicks (surname)
- Hicks (disambiguation)
