= Ken Higgs (disambiguation) =

Ken, Kenneth or Kenny Higgs may refer to:

- Ken Higgs (1937–2017), English cricketer
- Ken Higgs (Canadian football) (1930–2002), English football player
- Kenneth Higgs (1886-1959), English cricketer
- Kenny Higgs (born 1955), American basketball player
