= Joe Hicks =

Joe Hicks is the name of:

- Joe Hicks (baseball) (1932–2023), American baseball player
- Joe Hicks (musician), American R&B and soul blues singer and songwriter
- Joe R. Hicks (1941–2016), African-American conservative activist

== See also ==
- Joe Hicks Tipton, MLB catcher
- Hicks (surname)
