= Hix =

Hix or HIX may refer to:

== People ==
- DJ Hix, Northern Irish DJ
- Hix McCanless (1868–?), American architect
- H. L. Hix (born 1960), American poet
- Mark Hix (born 1962), English chef
- Simon Hix (born 1968), British political scientist

== Places ==
=== United States ===
- Hix, Georgia, an unincorporated community
- Hix, McDowell County, West Virginia, an unincorporated community
- Hix, Summers County, West Virginia, an unincorporated community

=== France ===
- Hix, a village in Bourg-Madame

== Other uses ==
- Health insurance exchange, in the United States
- Hixkaryana language, spoken in Brazil
- Jake Hix, a character in All the Wrong Questions

== See also ==
- Hicks (disambiguation)
