= William Hicks =

William, Will, Bill, or Billy Hicks may refer to:

== Law and politics ==
- Sir William Hicks, 1st Baronet (1596–1680), English Member of Parliament and Royalist officer
- William Watkin Hicks (1837–?), Florida politician and Methodist minister
- William Wesley Hicks (1843–1925), Louisiana state representative from 1900 to 1904
- William Joynson-Hicks, 1st Viscount Brentford (1865–1932), British politician
- William Harold Hicks (1888–1974), Canadian politician
- William Clayton Hicks (1919–1999), American politician in Wisconsin
- William H. Hicks (born 1925), American politician in New Jersey

== Sports ==
- Bill Hicks (footballer) (1899–1962), Australian rules footballer
- Billy Hicks (1927–2016), American moving target shooter
- Bill Hicks (American football) (born 1940), American football coach

== Others ==
- William Hicks (Cherokee chief) (1769–c. 1837), Principal Chief of the Cherokee Nation
- William Hicks (Royal Navy officer) (1788–1848), British Royal Navy lieutenant
- William Robert Hicks (1808–1868), British asylum superintendent and humorist
- William J. Hicks (1827–1911), American builder, architect and prison warden
- William Hicks (British soldier) (1830–1883), British soldier in the Bombay army
- William Hicks (pastor) (1869–1954), American Baptist pastor, academic administrator, and writer
- William Mitchinson Hicks (1850–1934), British mathematician and physicist
- William Woodbury Hicks (1896–1966), American philatelist
- Bill Hicks (1961–1994), American comedian
- Will Hicks (record producer), (born 1984) British record producer
