= Hix, West Virginia =

Hix, West Virginia may refer to one of two settlements named "Hix" in the state of West Virginia:

- Hix, McDowell County, West Virginia
- Hix, Summers County, West Virginia
