= Charles Tempest-Hicks =

British Army officer

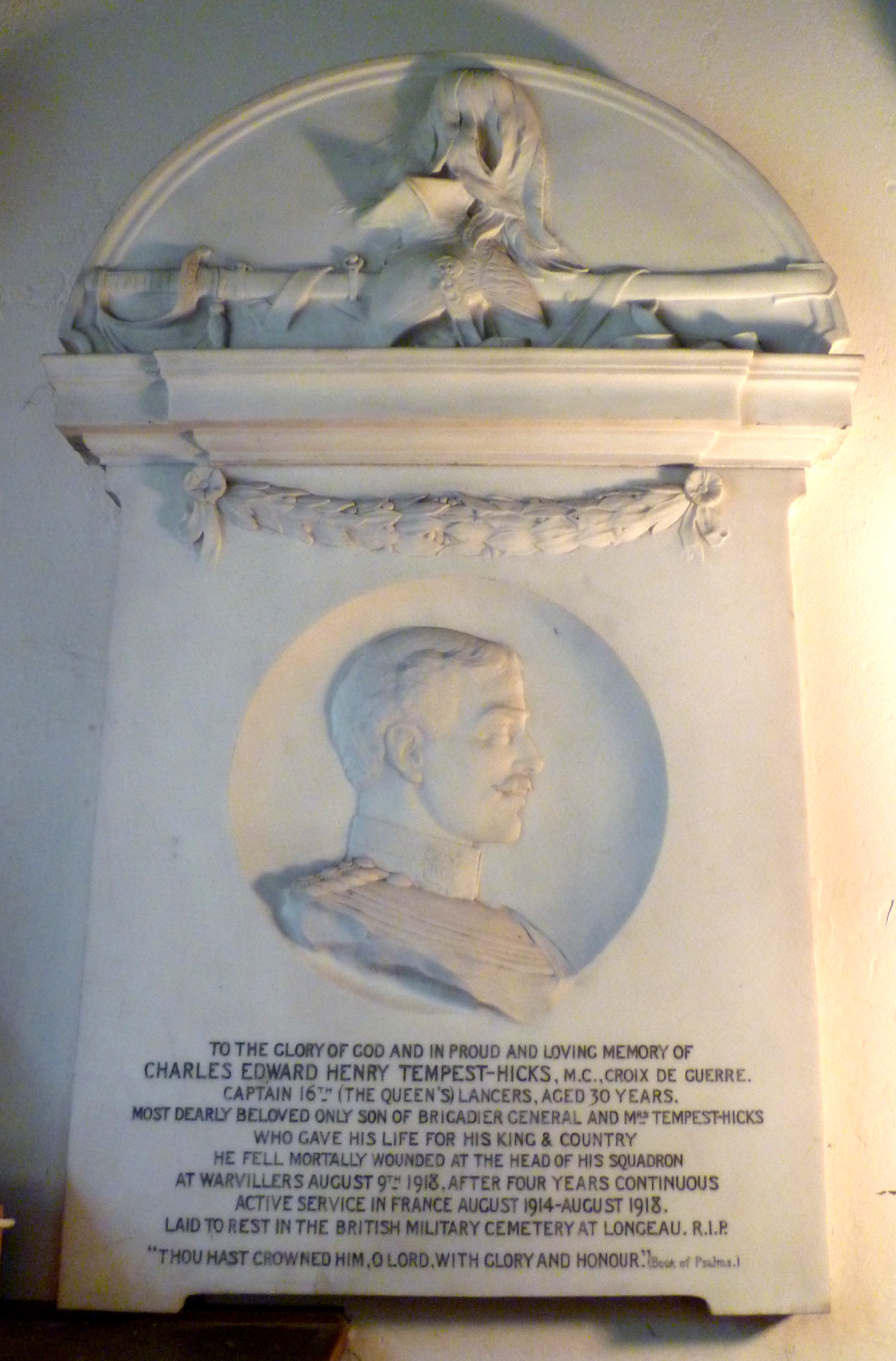
Monument to Charles Tempest-Hicks MC in St Mary, Monken Hadley.

Charles Edward Henry Tempest-Hicks MC (18 May 1888 – 9 August 1918) was a British Army officer in the 16th The Queen's Lancers.

Tempest-Hicks was the son of Brigadier-General Henry Tempest Hicks of Monken Hadley who served with distinction in the South African War. Charles Tempest-Hicks died in action at Warvillers during the First World War and is buried at the Longueau British Cemetery in Somme. A memorial to him by William Hamo Thornycroft exists inside St Mary's church, Monken Hadley. He was mentioned in dispatches and awarded the Military Cross and French Croix de Guerre.

He was educated at Ludgrove School and then Harrow School and Sandhurst, the latter for whom he played cricket.

== See also ==
- Gladsmuir
