= William J. Hicks =

American architect

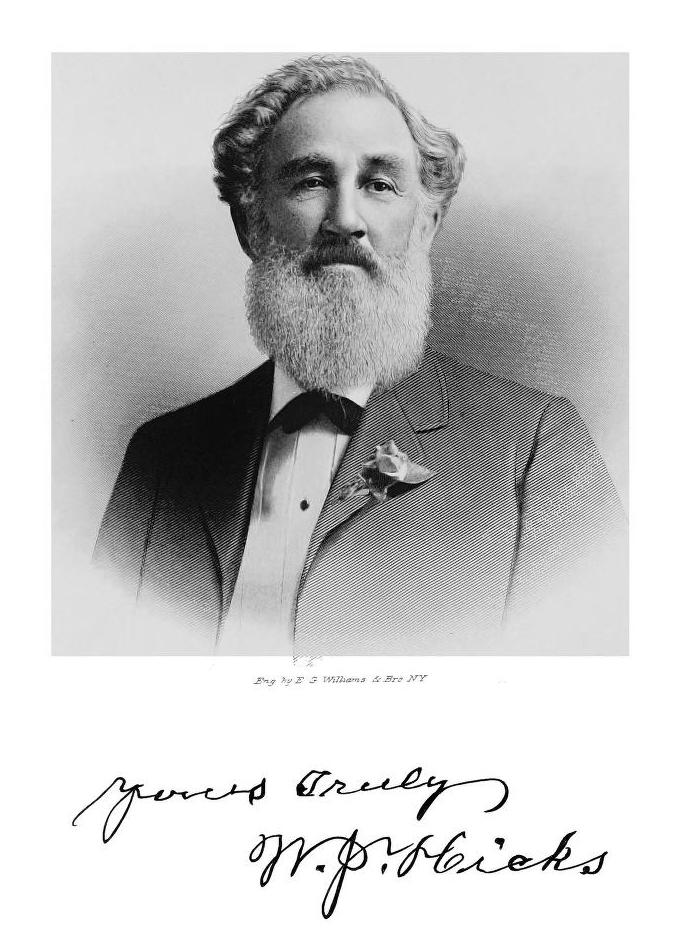
William Jackson Hicks

William Jackson Hicks (1827–1911) was a builder, architect and prison warden of North Carolina. He supervised a prison labor run brickworks and supplied bricks for use in the construction of a prison, other state buildings, and for use in private construction.

== Works ==
Works of Hicks are listed on the U.S. National Register of Historic Places. These include:

- Watts and Yuille Warehouses, 905 W. Main St. Durham, North Carolina (Hicks, W. J.), NRHP-listed
- One or more works in Bright Leaf Historic District, roughly bounded by W. Peabody St., Duke St., Minerva Ave., N&W RR, Corporation St., Ligget St., Morris St. and W. Loop Durham, North Carolina (Hicks, William Jackson), NRHP-listed
