= Hicks Creek =

Hicks Creek is the name of the following American streams:

- Hicks Creek (Santa Clara County), California
- Hicks Creek (Susquehanna River tributary), Luzerne County, Pennsylvania
- Hicks Creek (Texas), Bandera County
