= Tracy Higgs =

Tracy Higgs (also known as T.J. Higgs; born 1970) describes herself as a psychic medium and appears regularly in the media in the United Kingdom. She writes for Spirit and Destiny magazine, and has appeared on the Richard & Judy television programme.

In 2006 Higgs filmed a series for Zone Reality, with Tony Stockwell and Colin Fry called Psychic Private Eyes.

== Bibliography ==
- Higgs, TJ (16 July 2009). Living with the Gift. Rider Books. ISBN 978-1-84604-195-2.
- Higgs, TJ (5 August 2010). Signs from the Afterlife. Rider Books. ISBN 978-1-84604-198-3.
