= Tony Stockwell =

British psychic medium

Tony Stockwell is a British psychic medium, author and television personality. He was born in Walthamstow, East London and currently lives in Wickford, Essex.

== Career ==
Stockwell was born in London's East End. His career as a medium began at the age of 16 when he was invited to a local Spiritualist church by a friend to see another medium at work. After this experience, Tony decided that he wanted to become a medium. In his early years he practised mediumship at the Spiritualist Association of Great Britain.

Stockwell has worked extensively in the media and has had three of his own television series: The Psychic Detective, Street Psychic, and Psychic School. He has also had two one-off specials: Street Psychic San Francisco and The National ESP Challenge. He has also appeared on The Three Mediums, The Best of British Mediumship and guested on 6ixth Sense with Colin Fry. In 2009 he toured the UK with the American medium James Van Praagh.

In addition to his tours and media appearances, Stockwell has written four books about his experiences as a Spiritualist medium, and released four audio CDs on communication with spirits, angels, and spirit guides. He also runs a training school for aspiring mediums. Stockwell is well known for his enjoyment of medium curries.

== Bibliography ==
Books

- Spirited, Mobius; New Ed edition (Oct 2005) ISBN 978-0-340-83354-4
- Embracing Eternity, Mobius; New Ed edition (Mar 2007) ISBN 978-0-340-89794-2
- The Psychic Case Files, Hodder & Stoughton (Jul 2007) ISBN 978-0-340-93563-7
- Walking With Angels, (May 2010)

Instructional audio CDs

- Getting To Know Your Spirit Guides
- Healing The Wounded Soul
- Heighten Your Spiritual Awareness
- Angel Experience
