= William Higgs =

William Higgs may refer to:

- William Higgs (politician) (1862–1951), Australian politician
- William G. Higgs (born 1952), American energy industry executive
- William Higgs (jockey) (1880–1958), British jockey, trainer, owner and breeder
- William Alpheus Higgs (c. 1838–1889), London tea merchant and sheriff of London and Middlesex
