= Longueau =

- Commune
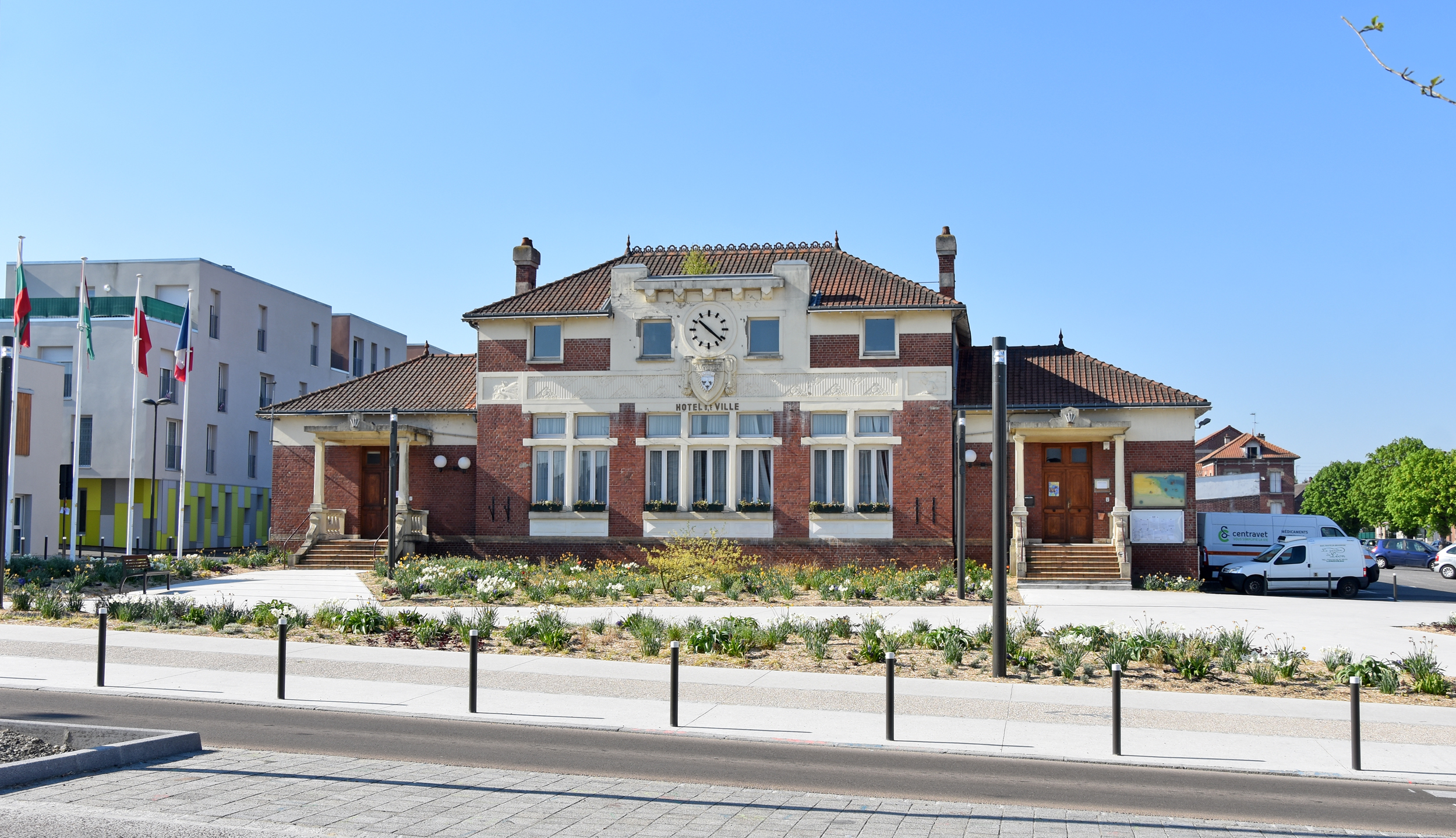
- The town hall of Longueau in 2019

- Coat of arms
- Location of Longueau
- Location within France Location within Hauts-de-France
- Coordinates: 49°52′15″N 2°21′25″E
- Country: France
- Region: Hauts-de-France
- Department: Somme
- Arrondissement: Amiens
- Canton: Amiens-4
- Intercommunality: Amiens Métropole

Government
  - Mayor (2020–2026): Pascal Ourdouillé
- Area^{1}: 3.42 km^{2} (1.32 sq mi)
- Elevation: 28 m (92 ft)
- Highest elevation: 64 m (210 ft)
- Lowest elevation: 23 m (75 ft)
- Population (2023): 5,680
  - Density: 1,660/km^{2} (4,300/sq mi)
- Time zone: UTC+01:00 (CET)
  - Summer (DST): UTC+02:00 (CEST)
- INSEE/Postal code: 80489 /80330
- ^{1} French Land Register data, which excludes lakes, ponds, glaciers > 1 km^{2} (0.386 sq mi or 247 acres) and river estuaries.

Longueau (French pronunciation: [lɔ̃ɡo]; Picard: Londjeu) is a commune in the Somme department in Hauts-de-France in northern France.

== Geography ==
Longueau is situated 4 miles (6 km) southeast of Amiens, a suburb just by the airport, on the N29 road. Longueau station has rail connections to Amiens, Creil, Arras, Lille, Compiègne and Paris.

== Population ==
Historical population
Year	Pop.	±% p.a.
1968	5,485	—
1975	5,598	+0.29%
1982	5,309	−0.75%
1990	4,940	−0.90%
1999	5,220	+0.61%
2007	5,267	+0.11%
2012	5,751	+1.77%
2017	5,621	−0.46%
2023	5,680	+0.17%
Source: INSEE

== Places of interest ==
The town was once a railway centre. The reinforced concrete depot, now a registered historic monument is one of four designed by Bernard Lafaille between the two world wars.

Longeau hosts a British military cemetery containing 204 Commonwealth war dead, primarily from the First World War.

== See also ==
- Communes of the Somme department
