= 2019 Durham gas explosion =

Deadly incident in North Carolina, US

Coordinates: 36.000013°N 78.908148°W

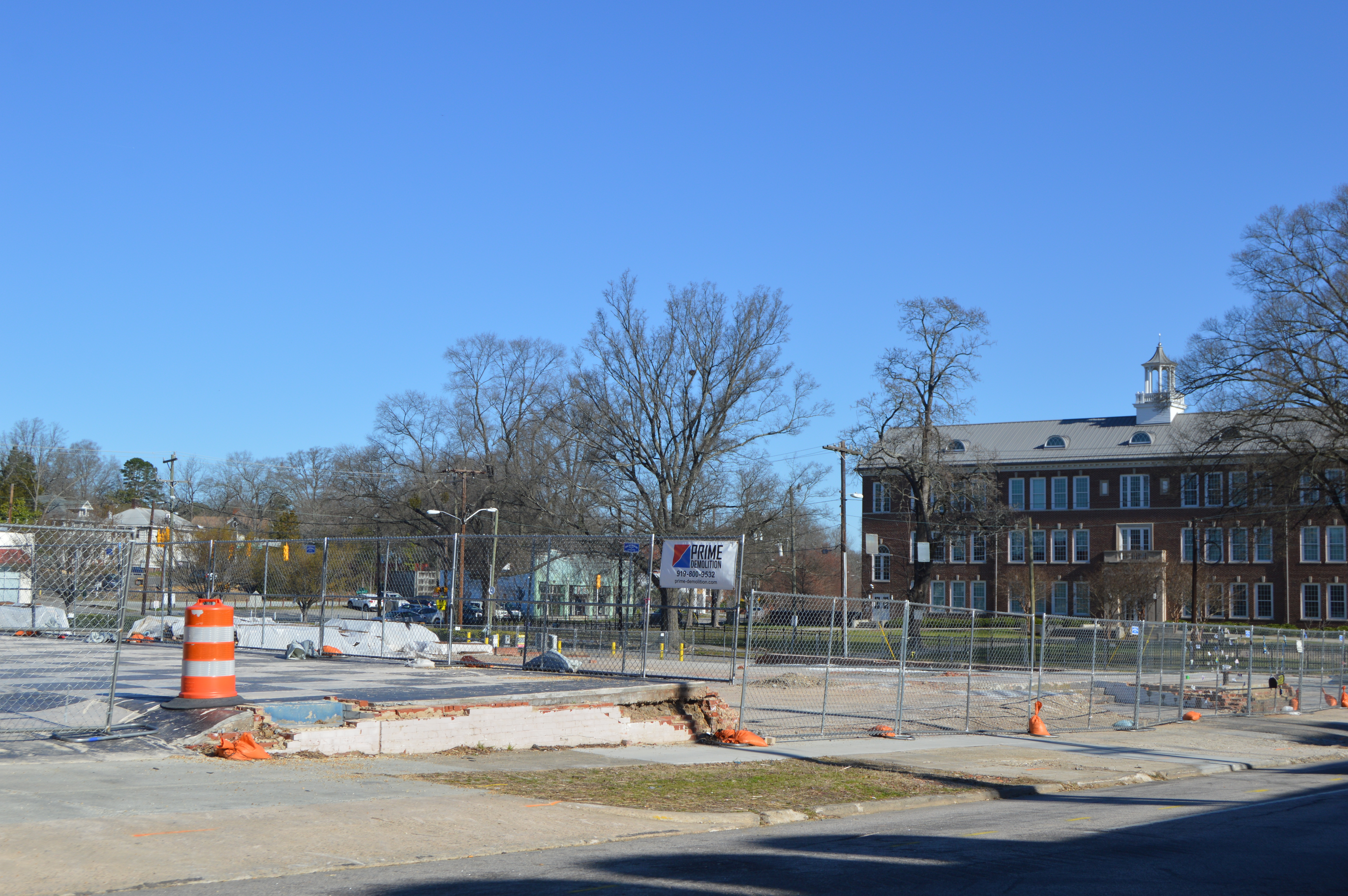
- Scene of the explosion in March 2020, cleared and fenced off
- Date: April 10, 2019
- Time: 10:07 am.
- Location: 115 North Duke Street, Brightleaf, Durham, North Carolina
- Cause: Accidental gas leak
- Deaths: 2
- Injuries: 25
- Property damage: Destruction and collapse of buildings located at 111 and 115 N. Duke St, damaged vehicles including Porsches, windows shattered in and around Brightleaf District

On April 10, 2019, a gas explosion occurred near downtown Durham, North Carolina at the 115 block of North Duke Street in the Brightleaf District. The blast destroyed several buildings and damaged dozens of others, killing two people and injuring 25 others, including 9 firefighters. City officials cited a gas leak as the cause of the explosion.

On June 22, 2020, four lawsuits were filed in relation to the explosion. Each lawsuit represented separate victims of the blast, including one of the two deceased.

== Background ==
The explosion occurred at a local coffee shop by the name of Kaffeinate. The store was run by shop owner Kong Lee and his family.

At 9:38 am, firefighters responded to a call of a potential gas leak near the Kaffeinate shop. Many witnesses reported the smell of gas prior to the explosion taking place. Durham officials stated that they evacuated eight to ten people from the coffee shop prior to the blast. The leak was reportedly caused by a gas line being breached by contractors who possessed valid work permits.

== Explosion ==
At 10:06 am, an explosion was reported near downtown Durham. The sound of the explosion was captured by one of the cameras facing the nearby 11-foot-8 bridge.

The damage was widespread, as businesses roughly two blocks away suffered damage, although this was mostly limited to shattered windows. Fifteen buildings suffered damage in and around the Brightleaf District. The coffee shop, Kaffeinate, was reduced to rubble as a result of the blast. An adjacent building housing a Porsche collection was destroyed. An office building directly in front of the coffee shop suffered extensive damage to its interior and exterior. The explosion was felt from several miles away, and a large smoke cloud from the resulting fire was seen from miles away. The smoke cloud was detected by local weather radar.

The Durham School of the Arts suffered damage to its interior, although no injuries were reported.

=== Casualties ===
Twenty-five people were treated for injuries and at least 10 people were sent to local hospitals. Both Duke Regional Hospital and Duke University Hospital received five patients. Kong Lee, the owner of Kaffeinate, was killed in the blast, as he prepared to evacuate the store. Jay Rambeaut, a Dominion Energy first responder, was sent to UNC Medical Center, where he died from his injuries on April 25.

Five of the injured were in critical condition. Nine of the 25 injured were responding firefighters. One firefighter suffered major injuries and underwent surgery. Vincent E. Price, the president of Duke University, confirmed that 10 Duke employees were injured in the explosion.

== Aftermath ==
Passersby and nearby building occupants rushed to the scene after the explosion, seeking to help the injured, while others helped motorists who were trapped in their cars by inflated airbags. City firefighters arrived to fight the fire that was caused by the explosion. Once the blaze was extinguished, a search-and-rescue effort began; it continued until the evening of the following day.

Following an investigation, officials in the Durham Fire Department released a report which determined that a three person crew from Optic Cable Technology digging horizontally to install underground cables breached a 3/4-inch (2 cm) gas line in front of Kaffeinate on the morning of the explosion. Shop owner Kong Lee went outside to complain about the gas smell – the report includes images from a nearby security camera that shows Lee waving his hand in front of his nose as he talked with the crew – but there was no evidence that Lee or anyone from Optic Cable called 911 to report the gas leak. The report was unable to determine what ignited the estimated 46,000 cubic feet (1,300 m^{3}) of natural gas that leaked out of the ruptured pipe in the roughly 60 minutes from the initial breach to the explosion at 10:06 am.
