= Frederick Hicks =

Frederick Hicks may refer to:

- Frederick Charles Hicks (1863–1953), American professor of economics and university president
- Frederick C. Hicks (1872–1925), American banker and United States Representative from New York
- Nugent Hicks (Frederick Cyril Nugent Hicks, 1872–1942), Anglican bishop and author
- Fred Hicks (baseball) (1888–1950), American baseball player
- Fred Hicks, author of Spirit of the Century and FATE (role-playing game system)
