= Henry Hicks =

Henry Hicks may refer to:

- Henry A. Hicks (died 1927), American labor union leader and political activist
- Henry Hicks (Nova Scotia politician) (1915–1990), lawyer, university administrator, and politician in Nova Scotia
- Henry Hicks (geologist) (1837–1899), Welsh physician, surgeon and geologist
- Hal Hicks (Henry Hicks, 1900–1965), Canadian professional ice hockey player
- Harry Hicks (athlete) (1925–2012), British Olympic runner
- Henry Tempest Hicks (1852–?), British soldier
