= Robert Hicks =

Robert Hicks or Bob Hicks may refer to:

- Barbecue Bob (1902–1931), early American blues musician born Robert Hicks
- Bob Hicks (activist) (1929–2010), American civil rights activist in Louisiana
- Bob Hicks (American football) (1921–2012), American college football coach
- Bobby Hicks (1933–2024), American bluegrass fiddler
- Robert C. Hicks (1927–2018), American college football coach
- Robert Drew Hicks (1850–1929), English classical scholar
- Robert Hicks (American author) (1951–2022), American author and preservationist
- Robert Hicks (American football) (born 1974), NFL offensive tackle
- Robert Hicks (Australian footballer) (born 1991), Australian rules footballer
- Robert Hicks (British politician) (born 1938), British Conservative Member of Parliament for Cornish constituencies
- Robert Hicks (Canadian politician) (1933–2014), Canadian Progressive Conservative politician

== See also ==
- Hicks (disambiguation)
