= General Hicks =

General Hicks may refer to:

- David Hicks (chaplain) (born 1942), U.S. Army major general
- Henry Tempest Hicks (1852–1922), British Army brigadier general
- Michael Hicks (British Army officer) (1928–2008), British Army major general
