= John Hicks (disambiguation) =

John Hicks (1904–1989) was an English economist.

John Hicks may also refer to:

== Politics ==
- John Hicks (Nova Scotia politician) (1715–1790), land agent and politician
- John Hicks (Fowey MP), 17th- and 18th-century English politician
- John F. Hicks, American diplomat, United States Ambassador to Eritrea
- John Sydney Hicks (1864–1931), British doctor and Australian politician
- John Hickes (politician), MP for Oxford

== Sports ==
- John Hicks (American football) (1951–2016), lineman
- John Hicks (baseball) (born 1989), American baseball player
- John Hicks (cricketer) (1850–1912), English cricketer
- John Hicks (field hockey) (1938–2021), New Zealand field hockey player
- Johnny Hicks (born 2005), Canadian ice hockey player

== Other ==
- John Hicks (pianist) (1941–2006), American jazz pianist and composer
  - John Hicks (album)
- John Hickes (minister), or Hicks, English nonconformist minister
- John Braxton Hicks (1823–1897), British obstetrician
- John Donald Hicks (1890–1972), American historian
- John J. Hicks (died 1997), director of National Photographic Interpretation Center
- John R. Hicks (1956–2005), American murderer
- John V. Hicks (1907–1999), English/Canadian poet and accountant, Saskatchewan Order of Merit
- John W. Hicks (1921–2002), president of Purdue University, 1982–1983

== See also ==
- Jon Hicks (disambiguation)
- Jack Hicks (1939–2008), photographer
- John Hick (1922–2012), theologian
