= Helen Burns Higgs =

- Helen Burns
- Born: 22 October 1897
- Died: 26 March 1983 (aged 85)
- Citizenship: Bahamas
- Occupations: Writer; Botanical illustrator Journalist
- Spouse: Leslie Charles Higgs
- Writing career
- Pen name: Mrs. Leslie Higgs
- Language: English

Helen Burns Higgs (also known as Mrs. Leslie Higgs) (1897–1983) was a Bahamian writer, journalist and botanical illustrator. Higgs specialized in the culture of the Bahamas, including herbal medicine and cooking. She self-published four books: Flowers of Nassau, Bahamian Cook Book: Recipes by Ladies of Nassau, which documents Higgs' forty-five years of research on Bahamian cuisine shared by women in Nassau; Bush Medicine in the Bahamas, a collection about herbal medicine; and Presenting Nassau in 1936. Higgs provided the illustrations for Bush Medicine in the Bahamas. She wrote a weekly column for The Nassau Guardian for over 15 years, writing about agriculture, gardening and plants. She died in 1983 and is buried at Sacred Heart Church Cemetery in Nassau.

== Publications ==
- Higgs, Helen Burns. Presenting Nassau. Self-published (1936).
- Higgs, Helen Burns. Flowers of Nassau. Miami: Miami Post Publishing Company (1956).
- Mrs. Leslie Higgs. Bush Medicine in the Bahamas. Self-published (1974).
- Mrs. Leslie Higgs. Bahamian Cook Book: Recipes by Ladies of Nassau. Self-published (1957).
