= HIG =

HIG may refer to:

- H.I.G. Capital, an American investment firm
- Human interface guidelines for software development
- Hezb-e-Islami Gulbuddin, an Afghan political party
- The Hartford, an American investment and insurance company
- Gjøvik University College (Norwegian: Høgskolen i Gjøvik)
- High-Value Interrogation Group, a multi-agency intelligence organization in the United States government
- Hig Hurtenflurst, a character in The Hitchhiker's Guide to the Galaxy
- Highbridge and Burnham railway station, in England
- Highett railway station, in Victoria, Australia
- HLA Informatics Group, a medical research group
- Home Interiors and Gifts, an American direct sales company
- Kamwe language, spoken in Nigeria
