= Judge Hicks =

Judge Hicks may refer to:

- Larry R. Hicks (1943–2024), judge of the United States District Court for the District of Nevada
- S. Maurice Hicks Jr. (born 1952), judge of the United States District Court for the Western District of Louisiana
- Xenophon Hicks (1872–1952), judge of the United States Court of Appeals for the Sixth Circuit
