= Clifford Hicks =

Clifford Hicks is the name of:

- Clifford B. Hicks (1920–2010), American writer
- Cliff Hicks (born 1964), former NFL player
