= Hicks, Ohio =

Unincorporated community in Ohio, U.S.

Coordinates: 39°21′30″N 84°03′22″W

Hicks is an unincorporated community in Warren County, in the U.S. state of Ohio.

== History ==
A variant name was "Hick Station". The community has the name of one J. Hicks.
