= Bright Leaf Historic District =

Historic district in North Carolina, United States

- U.S. National Register of Historic Places
- U.S. Historic district
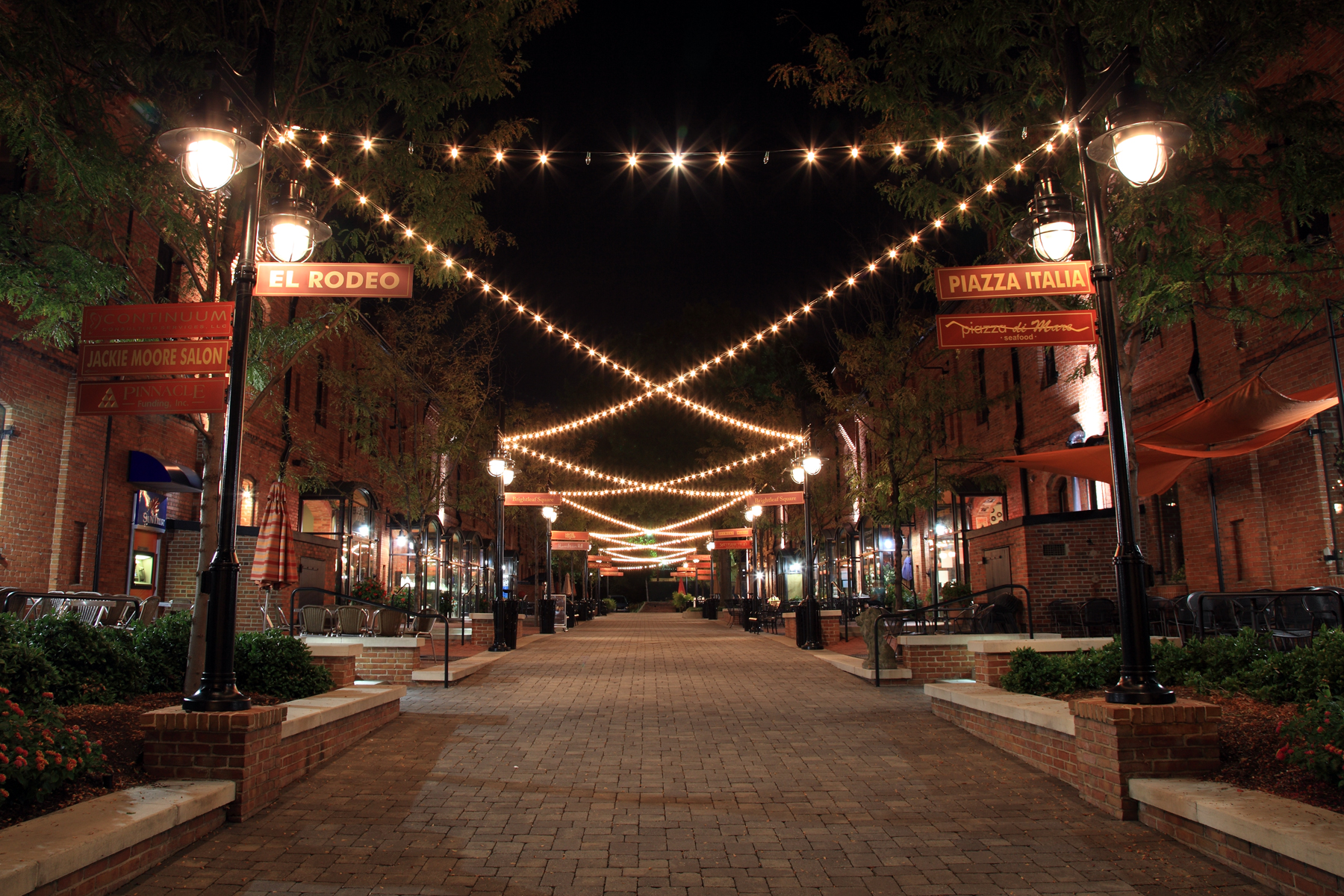

- Location within North Carolina Location within the United States
- Location: Roughly bounded by W. Peabody St., Duke St., Minerva Ave., N&W RR, Corporation St., Ligget St., Morris St. and W. Loop, Durham, North Carolina
- Coordinates: 36°00′06″N 78°54′21″W
- Area: 34 acres (14 ha)
- Built: 1884
- Built by: William H. Linthicum, William Jackson Hicks
- Architectural style: Italianate
- MPS: Durham MRA
- NRHP reference No.: 99001619
- Added to NRHP: December 30, 1999

The Bright Leaf Historic District is a national historic district located at Durham, Durham County, North Carolina. It encompasses 22 contributing buildings and seven contributing structures in an industrial section of Durham. The majority of the buildings were built from the 1870s to the World War II period, and are massive two- to four-story structures, usually rectangular in form with flat or very shallow gable roofs and of fireproof construction with brick exteriors. Notable buildings include the B. L. Duke Warehouse (late 1870s), the Italianate style W. Duke Sons and Company Cigarette Factory (1884), the Watts and Yuille Warehouses, Liggett and Myers Office Building, Chesterfield Building, Flowers Building (1916), Imperial Tobacco Company Factory (1916), White Warehouse (1926), and five Romanesque Revival style buildings built by The American Tobacco Company trust—Walker Warehouse (1897), Cobb Building (1898), O'Brien Building (1899), Hicks Warehouse (1903) and Toms Warehouse (1903).

It was listed on the National Register of Historic Places in 1999.

== See also ==
- Watts and Yuille Warehouses
- 2019 Durham gas explosion
