= Henry Marcellus Higgs =

Henry Marcellus Higgs (1855–1929) was a British composer and performer whose early life and entire career was spent in London. His published output includes not only original instrumental, organ and sacred/secular vocal music but also arrangements of music from popular comtemporary stage works both for solo piano and for ensembles.

== Early life ==
Henry Marcellus Higgs was one of three children born to organist and composer Marcellus Higgs (1827–88) and his wife Clara, nee Tomlin (c.1829-?). The organist and academic musician James Higgs, was brother to Marcellus.

At the time of his birth Henry's family were living in the parish of St George Hanover Square, London. Henry's father Marcellus was organist of St James the Less, Westminster, and teacher of music and singing. By 1861 the family had moved to Bessborough Street in the parish of St John Westminster, where Marcellus had been appointed organist of the parish church, developing "considerable private teaching".

In 1879, Henry married Emmeline Meates (1852-1927) at Holy Trinity, Vauxhall Bridge Road, London. Henry and Emmeline settled in Twickenham before moving to Sutton. They had six children: Irene Emmeline Marcella Higgs, William Clapham Marcellus Higgs, Sidney Marcellus Higgs, Ethel Florence Gertrude Higgs, Ernest Henry Marcellus Higgs and Margaret Harriet Higgs.

== Career ==
=== Organist ===
Henry Marcellus Higgs was variously organist of St Saviour Pimlico, St. Paul’'s Church, Great Portland Street and of Christ Church Sutton. In 1902 Henry Higgs had become a United Grand Lodge of England freemason at Wallington Lodge No. 1892 in Wallington, Surrey, and was the organist of this lodge.

=== Editor ===
H. M. Higgs worked for the music publisher Metzler & Co. and then for 22 years he was chief music editor for Chappell & Co.

== Compositions ==
=== Choral ===
- 1902: 'I was glad'. Anthem for SATB and organ.

=== Organ ===
- 1883: Three Pieces: Allegretto, Andante, Processional March (London: Novello)
- 1887: Allegro; Communion Offertory; Prelude and Fugue; Melodie, Offertoire in D-minor; Priére and Pastorale; (London: Novello)
- 1887: Sonata in C-minor. Published in instalments in the Organists Quarterly Journal (London: Novello) nos. 73,74,76[sic] and as a complete work in 1905 (London: Ashdown and Co.)
- 1897: "Original Compositions" (4 vols): Grand Choeur in D, Priére, Romance sans paroles, Adoration, Toccata in B-minor, Pastorale, Marche Solennelle, Duo Cantabile, Méditation, Prelude, Nocturne and Marche Festivale. (London: Metzker and Co)
- 1899: Cantiléne Pastorale; Lento Religioso: Offertoire; Théme avec variations (London: Schott and Co.).
- 1900: Chanson Pastorale; Légende (London: Novello)
- 1905: Six Pieces (Preludio, Romanza, Alla Marcia, Intermezzo, Priére du Soir, Toccata Militaire) (London: Augner and Co.)
- 1905: Six Pieces (Toccata A-minor, Canzone, Introduction and Fugato in A-minor, Duo in Canon, Elegie, Grand Chorus) Op. 134 (London: Novello)
- 1907: Variations on “Heinlein” (in The Village Organist Bk. 45) (London: Novello)
- 1913: Twelve Miniatures (London: Novello)
- 1919: Allegro (London: Novello)
