= Michael Hicks =

Michael Hicks or Mike Hicks may refer to:

- Michael Hicks (American football) (1973–2024), American football running back
- Michael Hicks (basketball) (born 1983), American-Polish basketball player
- Michael Hicks (British Army officer) (1928–2008), British general
- Michael Hicks (courtier) (1543–1612), English courtier, secretary to Lord Burghley
- Michael Hicks (game designer) (born 1993), independent video game designer and musician
- Michael Hicks (historian) (born 1948), British historian
- Michael Hicks (musicologist) (born 1956), BYU professor of music and composer
- Michael Hicks (musicologist) (1937–2017), British communist and trade unionist
- 165659 Michaelhicks, a main-belt minor planet

- Michael D. Hicks (1964–2023), the scientist namesake of that planet

- Michael J. Hicks (born 1962), economist and columnist
- Michael W. Hicks, American computer scientist
- Mike Hicks (trade unionist)
- Mike Hicks (Canadian politician)
