= Joe R. Hicks =

American political commentator and activist

Joe Russell Hicks (July 13, 1941 – August 28, 2016) was an African-American political commentator and community activist. He was vice president of Community Advocates Inc., and served as the executive director of the Los Angeles City Human Relations Commission from 1997 to 2001, under Mayor Richard Riordan.

== Writing and media appearances ==
Hicks wrote for the Washington Post, Los Angeles Times, Jewish Journal, and National Review, and frequently appeared as a television commentator. He hosted a Saturday evening radio show on the Los Angeles radio station KFI; his final show was January 31, 2009. He was a regular contributor to Pajamas Media via their PJTV online video site, where he hosted a weekly show called "The Hicks File".

In 1996, he debated David Duke at California State University, Northridge over Proposition 209.

== Career ==
Hicks was the vice president of Community Advocates Inc., a political think tank based in Los Angeles. He served as a member of the California Advisory Panel to the United States Commission on Civil Rights. From 2006 to 2009, he hosted "The Joe Hicks Show", a weekly Los Angeles radio talk show on KFI AM 640.

In 1991, Hicks became the executive director of the Southern Christian Leadership Conference, founded by Martin Luther King Jr., and served until 1997. He served as the executive director of the Los Angeles City Human Relations Commission, under then-Mayor Richard Riordan, from 1997 to 2001.

Hicks served three years as a member of the Board of Governors for the California State Bar, stepping down in 2002.

Hicks, a lifelong Los Angeles resident, became an advocate after the Watts riots in the 1960s. He served as Communications Director for the Southern California chapter of the American Civil Liberties Union. In the early 1990s, Hicks was Executive Director of the Greater Los Angeles chapter of the Southern Christian Leadership Conference.

== Political positions ==
Up until the 1990s, Hicks views were conventionally liberal. However, by the early-1990s Hicks began a re-examination of these views which resulted in dramatic changes. Ultimately, he described himself as a political conservative with libertarian leanings.

Hicks was formerly a board member of the anti-death penalty group Death Penalty Focus, but supported capital punishment up until his 2016 death. Hicks spoke out against black on black crime, the "culture of incompetence" at Martin Luther King Jr.-Harbor Hospital, and the "black hooligans" protesting the BART Police shooting of Oscar Grant.

== Personal life ==
Hicks was divorced with five children. He died on August 28, 2016, at a hospital in Santa Monica, California from complications from surgery.
