= Hick's Cayes =

Group of islands in Belize

Coordinates: 17°40′N 88°08′W

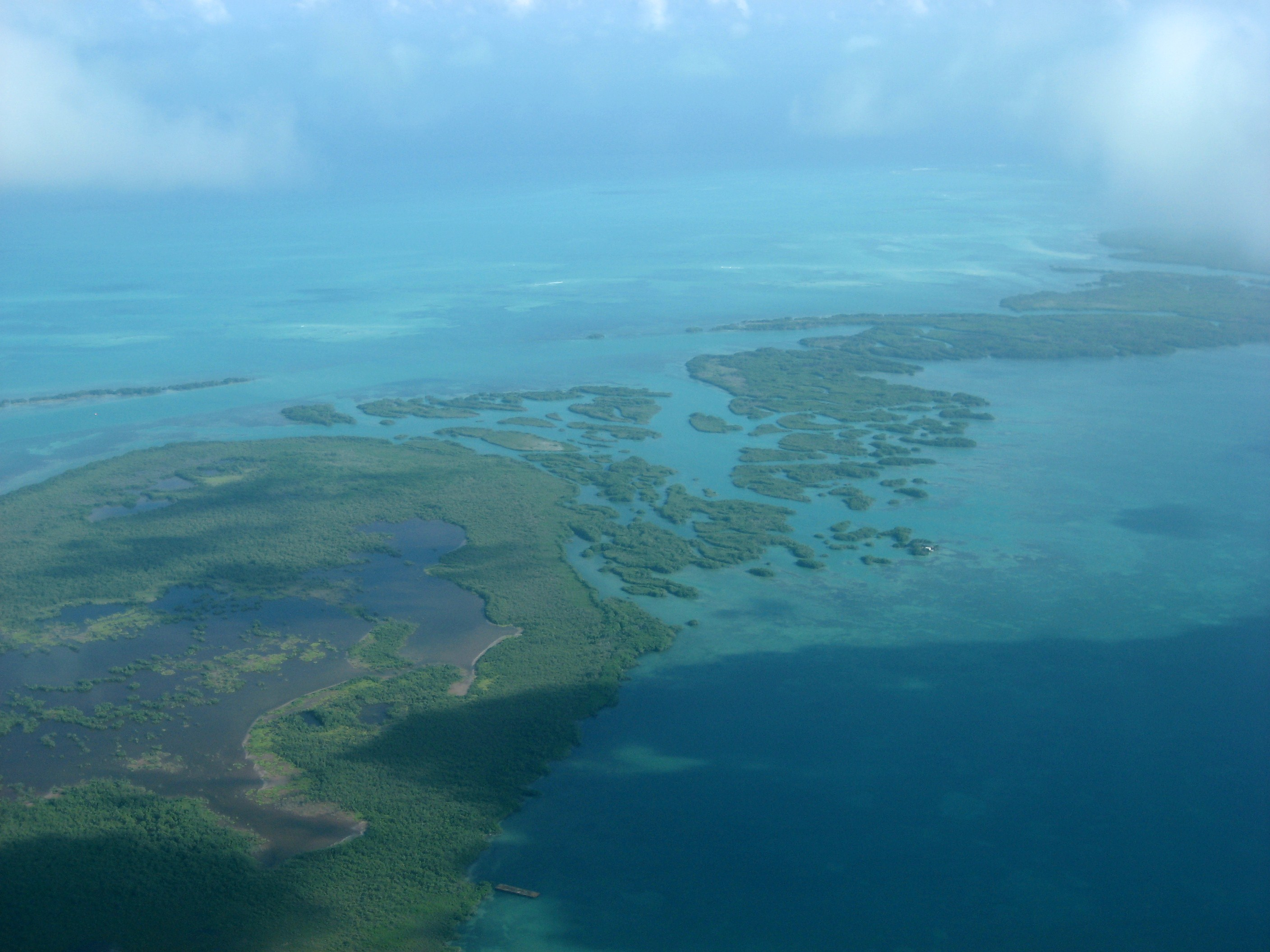
Aerial view of one of the Hick's Cayes

Hick's Cayes (Spanish: Cayos Hicks) are a group of uninhabited islands in the south of Chetumal Bay, between St. George's Caye and Caye Chapel, about halfway between Belize City and San Pedro Town.
