= 6ixth Sense =

British television series

- Starring: Colin Fry
- Country of origin: United Kingdom

Production
- Running time: 30 minutes

Original release
- Network: Living TV
- Release: 28 May – 29 September 2002

6ixth Sense is a British television series aired on Living TV. Hosted by spiritualist medium Colin Fry, it features him giving Psychic readings to a studio audience, and occasionally shows one-to-one readings.

== Background ==
Fry turned down three offers to do a television programme before he finally accepted to make 6ixth Sense with Colin Fry in 2002. 6ixth Sense catapulted him to fame and made him a household name. It was the start of a successful run of TV shows for him on Living TV. IPM, the television company who made 6ixth Sense, said that they wanted to make a British version of Crossing Over with Fry working with an audience theatre-style and doing one-to-one sittings. Their interest in the genre was influenced by Living TV showing Crossing Over with American medium John Edward and Derek Acorah who had been on Psychic Livetime on Granada Breeze.

== 6ixth Sense Special ==
A 6ixth Sense Special was broadcast on Living TV in 2002/03 showing footage from the original pilot episode, explaining how the programme was made and its origins, also featuring highlights, interviews and outtakes.

== DVD ==
A DVD entitled 6ixth Sense with Colin Fry including 15 minutes of unseen footage was released in 2003 by Living TV and Flextech Rights Limited.
