= Eric Hicks =

Eric Hicks may refer to:

- Eric Hicks (American football) (born 1976), National Football League player
- Eric Hicks (basketball) (born 1983), college basketball player
