= Senator Hicks (disambiguation) =

Thomas Holliday Hicks (1798–1865) was a U.S. Senator from Maryland from 1862 to 1865. Senator Hicks may also refer to:

- A. M. Hicks (1835–1915), Mississippi State Senate
- Carri Hicks (fl. 2010s–present), Oklahoma State Senate
- Charles P. Hicks (1858–1929), Arizona State Senate
- Clayton Hicks (1919–1999), Wisconsin State Senate
- Edward Hicks (pioneer) (1818–1873), Wisconsin State Senate
- Edwin Hicks (1830–1902), New York State Senate
- Herbert Hicks (1872–?), Illinois State Senate
- Larry S. Hicks (born 1958), Wyoming State Senate
- Paula Hicks-Hudson (born 1951), Ohio State Senate
- Xenophon Hicks (1872–1952), Tennessee State Senate
