= John Hicks (Fowey MP) =

English politician (1658 or 1659–1734)

Member of Parliament
- In office December 1701 – 1708
- Constituency: Fowey

Personal details
- Born: 26 February 1658/9
- Died: 1734
- Education: Exeter College, Oxford

John Hicks (26 February 1658/9 – June 1734) was an English politician and lawyer who sat as MP for Fowey from December 1701 till 1708.

He was the first son of Thomas Hicks and Elizabeth. He was educated at St. Ewe School and Exeter College, Oxford in 1675. He entered the Middle Temple in 1678 and was called to the bar in 1685. Around 2 January 1695, he married Elizabeth.

He first contested Lostwithiel in 1698 but was unsuccessful. He unsuccessfully contested Lostwithiel again in April 1701. In December 1701, he entered Parliament as MP for Fowey. In 1702, he was re-elected for Fowey after a contest.

He died by a fall in June 1734.
