= Suzanne Higgs =

English psychologist

Academic background
- Education: BA, MA, Somerville College, Oxford; PhD, psychology, 1996, Durham University
- Thesis: Benzodiazepine receptors and the control of ingestive behaviour (1996)

Academic work
- Institutions: University of Birmingham

Suzanne Higgs is an English psychologist. She is a professor in the Psychobiology of Appetite at the University of Birmingham and was editor-in-chief of the journal Appetite from 2012 to 2022.

== Early life and education ==
Higgs earned her Bachelor of Arts and Master's degree from the Somerville College, Oxford in 1989 before receiving her PhD in psychology from Durham University. She completed her post-doctoral research at Oxford before earning an academic position at the University of Birmingham in 1999.

== Career ==
Higgs' research at Birmingham focused on the link between memory and food addiction. In 2002, she published Memory for recent eating and its influence on subsequent food intake, which found that when participants were reminded of when they previously ate they were less likely to overeat. She followed up this research a few year later by publishing Memory and its role in appetite regulation in the journal Physiology & Behavior. As a result of her academic input, Higgs was appointed editor-in-chief of the journal Appetite.

In 2013, Higgs received a £333K Economic and Social Research Council (ESRC) grant to research ways social norms can promote healthy eating. This resulted in the publication of Social norms and their influence on eating behaviours in 2015, which concluded that social norms influenced food choices and intake due to fears of social judgement. Due to the impact she had on her field, Higgs was appointed President-Elect of the Society for the Study of Ingestive Behavior. Following this, she was the co-recipient of a £800,000 project grant from the Biotechnology and Biological Sciences Research Council to explore how the pleasure of eating is affected by cognitive functions. In 2017, Higgs collaborated with Jeff Brunstrom and Lenny Vartanian to explore how eating with other people affects appetite using funding from an ESRC grant.
