= Eric Higgs =

Eric Higgs may refer to:

- Eric Sidney Higgs (1908–1976), English archaeologist
- Eric Higgs (environmental scholar) (born 1958), Canadian philosopher and ecological planner
