= George Hickes =

George Hickes may refer to:

- George Hickes (divine) (1642–1715), English divine and scholar
- George Hickes (Manitoba politician) (born 1946), Canadian politician
- George Hickes (Nunavut politician) (born 1968/69), Canadian politician, son of the above

== See also ==
- George Hicks (disambiguation)
