= Hicks City, Missouri =

Unincorporated community in Missouri, U.S.

Coordinates: 38°53′08″N 94°07′26″W

Hicks City is an unincorporated community in Jackson County, in the U.S. state of Missouri.

== History ==
A post office called Hicks City was established in 1872, and remained in operation until 1906. The community has the name of Russell Hicks, an original owner of the site.
