= George Hicks =

George Hicks may refer to:

- George Hicks (trade unionist) (1879–1954), British trade unionist and politician
- George Hicks (footballer) (1902–1954), English footballer
- George Elgar Hicks (1824–1914), English painter
- George Hicks (RAF officer) (1900–1951), World War I flying ace
- George Hicks (broadcast journalist) (1905–1965), American war correspondent
- George L. Hicks, college football player and colonel in the U. S. Army
- George Dawes Hicks (1862–1941), British philosopher

== See also ==
- George Hickes (disambiguation)
