= William G. Higgs =

American businessman

Bill Higgs
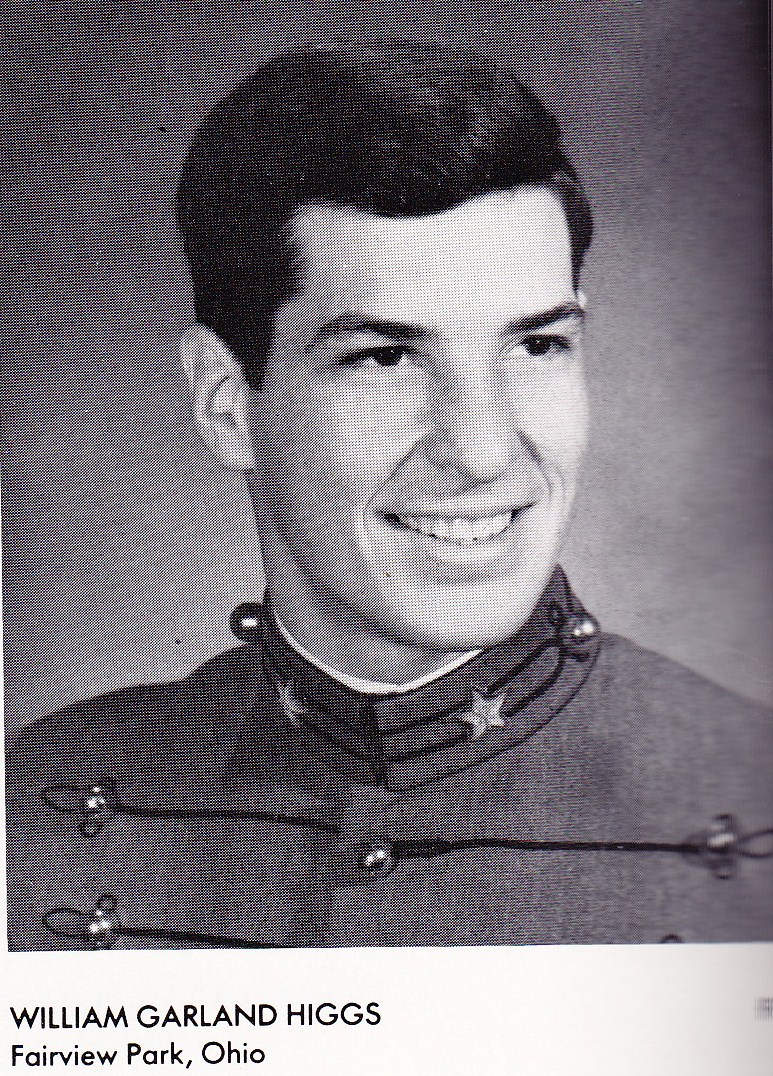
- William Higgs cadet yearbook photo from West Point in 1974
- Born: William Garland Higgs; June 9, 1952 (age 73); Denver, Colorado

William (Bill) Garland Higgs (born 1952) is an American businessman and co-founder of Mustang Engineering in 1987. Born in Denver, he was raised in Cleveland, Ohio.

== Background ==
Higgs was admitted to the United States Military Academy (West Point) and graduated as a Distinguished Graduate (graduated in the top 5% of his class) in 1974. While there he was active in soccer, judo, and wrestling. He was also a semi-finalist for a Rhodes Scholarship. Upon graduation he served five years in the Army as a combat engineer and Ranger.

Higgs co-founded Mustang Engineering in 1987 in Houston, Texas despite the oil and gas industry's struggles at the time. The company focused on engineering, procurement, and construction management to offshore oil and gas platforms. The company used computer-aided design when most were still doing manual drawings. Mustang Engineering is now a business unit of Wood Group, based in Aberdeen, Scotland. The company also works in pipeline, automation, and nonenergy process markets. In 2004, Higgs and Paul Redmon received the Industry Achievement Award from the Engineering and Construction Contracting Association. In 2016, Higgs published a book called Mustang the Story that detailed the founding and ultimate success of Mustang Engineering.

== Community involvement ==
Higgs got involved in Scouting as a nine-year-old Cub Scout in Cleveland, Ohio. He became an Eagle Scout in 1967 and later earned three palms. Higgs stayed active in Scouting as an adult and was recognized with the Distinguished Eagle Scout Award (DESA) in 2004.

He credits the lessons he learned in his involvement with Scouting for the ability to get his company going. He believes that Scouting helps a boy throughout his life by improving family communication, values, service, and achievement. He noted that on the application to West Point three of ten background questions related to Scouting: "Were you a Scout? Were you an Eagle Scout? Were you a senior patrol leader?"

== Personal life ==
Higgs is married to Ann. They have two grown children: Greg and Stephanie. Higgs continues to support Scouting.

== Published works ==
- Higgs, Bill (January 7, 2020). Mustang The Story: From Zero to $1 Billion. Forbes Books. ISBN 978-1946633699.
- (Bill) Higgs, William G. (March 2016). Culture Code Champions: 7 Steps to Scale & Succeed in Your Business. Independent Publisher. ISBN 978-1495198755.
