= Watts and Yuille Warehouses =

Historic warehouses in North Carolina, US

- U.S. National Register of Historic Places
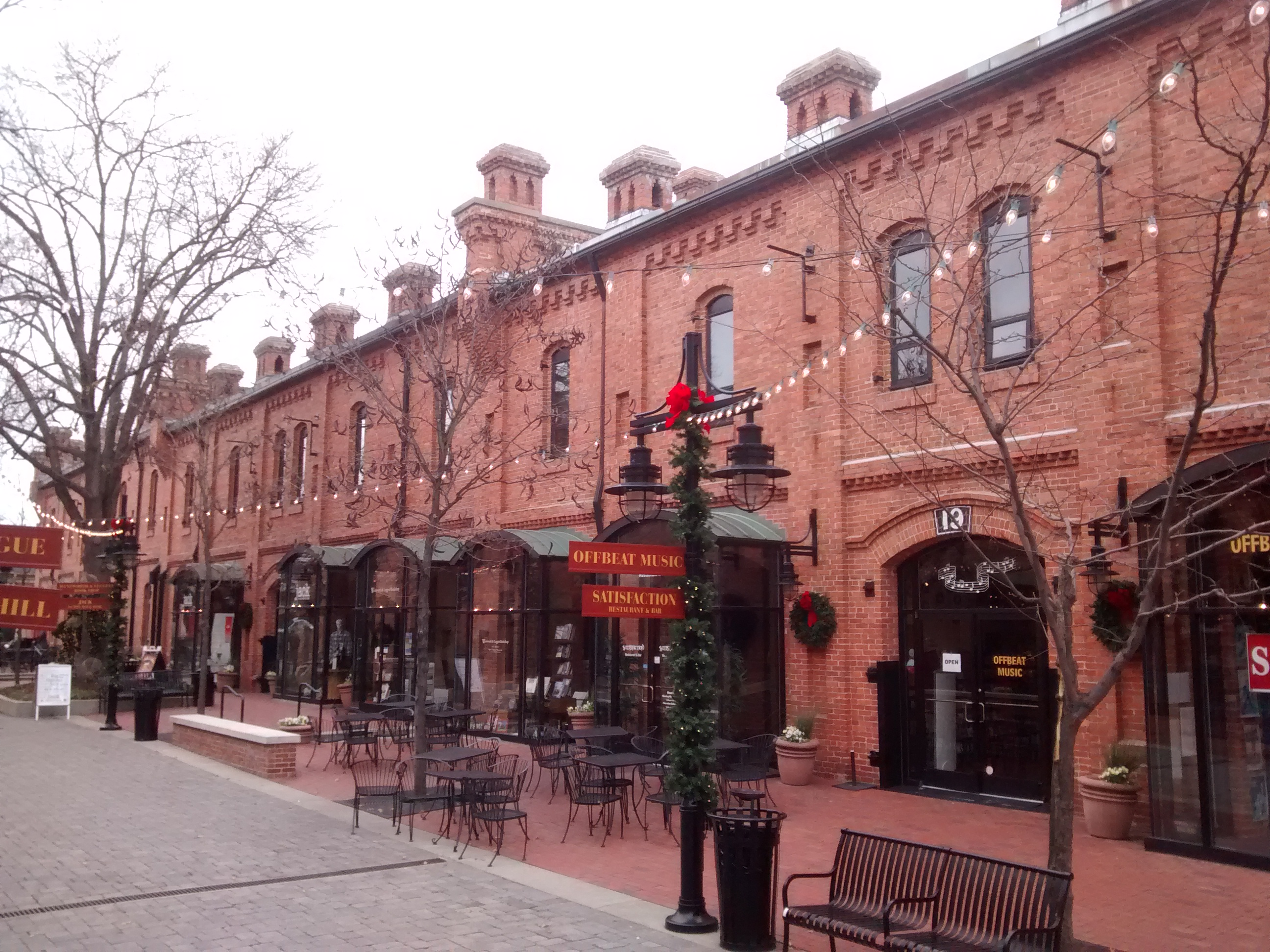
- Yuille Warehouse in December 2014

- Location within North Carolina Location within the United States
- Location: 905 W. Main St., Durham, North Carolina
- Coordinates: 36°0′1″N 78°54′37″W
- Area: 2.4 acres (0.97 ha)
- Built: 1904
- Architect: Hicks, W. J.; Hunt, Albert F.
- Architectural style: Romanesque, Norman Revival
- NRHP reference No.: 84002259
- Added to NRHP: April 5, 1984

Watts and Yuille Warehouses, also known as Brightleaf Square, are two historic tobacco storage warehouses located at Durham, Durham County, North Carolina. They are part of the Bright Leaf Historic District. They were built in 1904, and are two identical buildings parallel to each other with a courtyard in between. They are two-story Romanesque-style brick structures, seven bays wide and twenty bays long. Each unit of the warehouses is 75 feet by 118 feet, for a total of 35,400 square feet on each floor. They are an example of "slow burn" masonry and wood factory construction. They were among the 12 brick tobacco storage warehouses erected by The American Tobacco Company trust beginning in 1897. The buildings have been converted to retail and office use.

It was listed on the National Register of Historic Places in 1984.
