= Longueau British Cemetery =

Cemetery located in Somme, France

- Commonwealth War Graves Commission
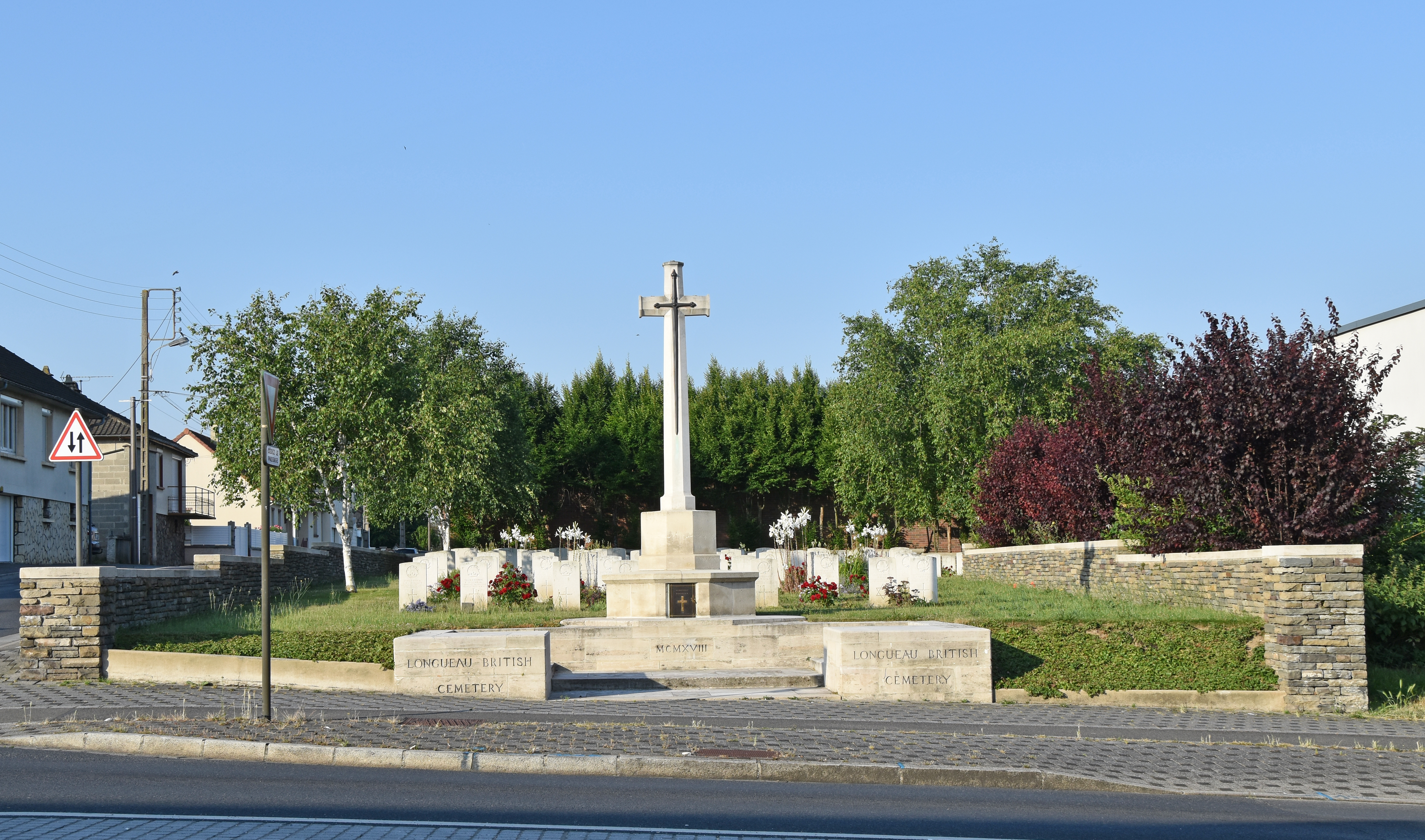
- Cross of Sacrifice at the cemetery
- Used for those deceased 1918-1945
- Established: April 1918
- Location: 49.8694°N 2.3593°E near Amiens, Somme, France
- Designed by: Reginald Blomfield
- Total burials: 204
- Unknowns: 14

Burials by nation
- United Kingdom 74; Canada 65; Australia 65

Burials by war
- World War I 202; World War II 2

Longueau British Cemetery is a First World War cemetery of Commonwealth soldiers in France, located to the east of Longueau, a suburb south-east of Amiens, Somme, France. The cemetery was begun in April 1918 and contains 204 burials, 14 of which are unidentified. Two Second World War airmen are also interred in the cemetery.

== History ==
The cemetery was created in April 1918, as the British defensive lines before Amiens were re-established to contain a German push. Interments were taken until the end of August 1918 and later interments were made as field graves were moved to the cemetery. The cemetery was designed by Sir Reginald Blomfield.
