= Jon Hicks =

Jon Hicks may refer to:

- Jon Hicks (designer) (born 1972), English designer and creator of the Firefox logo
- Jon Hicks (journalist), English journalist and editor of the UK edition of Official Xbox Magazine

== See also ==
- John Hicks (disambiguation)
