= Fred Hicks (baseball) =

American baseball player (1888–1950)

- Third baseman
- Born: May 16, 1888; Kansas City, Missouri, U.S.
- Died: October 20, 1950 (aged 62); Kansas City, Missouri, U.S.

Negro league baseball debut
- 1920, for the Kansas City Monarchs

Last appearance
- 1920, for the Kansas City Monarchs

Teams
- Kansas City Monarchs (1920)

Fred Hicks (May 16, 1888 – October 20, 1950) was an American Negro league third baseman in the 1920s.

A native of Kansas City, Missouri, Hicks played for the Kansas City Monarchs in 1920. He died in Kansas City in 1950 at age 62.
