= James Higgs =

English organist and teacher (1829–1902)

James Higgs (1829 – 26 April 1902) was an English organist and teacher, and the uncle of Henry Marcellus Higgs.

== Life and career ==
James Higgs was born in Lambeth in 1829. He studied under his father, an amateur of ability. He succeeded the late Dr. Wylde as organist of Eaton Chapel in 1844 and in the following year, on the secession of his brother Marcellus Higgs, he became organist of St. Benet and St.Peter, Paul's Wharf. His successive organ appointments were St. Mark's, Kennington, 1852–64, St.Michael's, Stockwell, 1864-7 and for twenty-eight years of St. Andrews, Holborn, 1867 to 1895, when he retired from playing in public.

In 1864 he was among the first twenty-one members of the Royal College of Organists. Some years later, in 1867, he was appointed as examiner for the Royal College of Organists and from then on he frequently acted as examiner. Even later, in 1874, he graduated Mus. Bac. Oxon from New College, Oxford. His well-deserved doctor's degree was conferred upon him by the Archbishop of Canterbury.

As original member of the Musical Association, he succeeded the late Charles Kensington Salaman as Hon.Secretary in 1877, and held the post for six years. He read two instructive papers before the Association - on 'Bach's Art of Fugue', in 1877, and 'Samuel Wesley : his life, times, and influence on music', in 1894. He was the author of two useful primers - Fugue, and Modulation. In collaboration with Sir Frederic Bridge he edited 'Bach's Organ Music', and he was the editor of a collection of two-part Solfeggi in Novello's Primer Series.

In 1883 he was appointed as one of the Directors of Trinity College, London and Professor of Harmony at the Royal College of Music. In 1900 he received the appointment of Dean of the Faculty of Music at the University of London. Higgs died in London on 26 April 1902. In the Musical Times, the uncredited obituary concluded with the following. "Dr. Higgs will be long remembered for his thoroughness as a teacher and for his kindly nature - qualities possessed by him in no small degree, and to which the present writer, one of his old pupils, bears full and grateful testimony".

== Appointments ==
- Organist of St Peter's Church, Eaton Square 1843
- Organist of St Benet's, Paul's Wharf 1844 – 1852
- Organist of St Mark's Church, Kennington 1852 – 1864
- Organist of St. Michael's Church, Stockwell 1864 - 1867
- Organist of St Andrew's, Holborn 1867 – 1895

== Publications ==
- Editor of a collection of two-part Solfeggi, Novello Primer Series.
- Joint editor of the organ works of J.S. Bach with Sir Frederick Bridge.
