= Thomas Hicks =

Thomas or Tom Hicks may refer to:

== Sports ==
- Thomas Hicks (bobsleigh) (1918–1992), American bobsledder who won a bronze medal at the 1948 Winter Olympics
- Thomas Hicks (athlete) (1876–1952), American athlete who won the marathon gold medal at the 1904 Summer Olympics
- Tom Hicks (cricketer) (born 1979), English cricketer
- Tom Hicks (American football) (born 1952), American football player
- Tom Hicks (rugby union) (born 1991), British rugby player
- Thomas Hicks (tennis) (1869–1956), Australian tennis player and administrator

== Others ==
- Thomas Holliday Hicks (1798–1865), U.S. senator and governor of Maryland
- Tom Hicks (1946–2025), American businessman from Texas
- Thomas O. Hicks Jr., American businessman from Texas
- Tommy Steele (Thomas Willam Hicks, born 1936), British entertainer
- Thomas Hicks (painter) (1823–1890), American painter
- Thomas W. Hicks, Under Secretary of the Navy
