= Dan Hicks =

Dan or Daniel Hicks may refer to:

- Dan Hicks (singer) (1941–2016), American singer and musician
- Dan Hicks (actor) (1951–2020), American actor
- Dan Hicks (sportscaster) (1962–2026), American sportscaster
- Dan Hicks (archaeologist) (born 1972), British historical archaeologist-anthropologist
- Daniel Hicks, builder and first owner of Governor Charles Croswell House
- Daniel Hicks, player-owner of the West Virginia Wild basketball team
- Daniel Hicks, Vogue Italia cover model
- Daniel Hicks, a fictional character in "Nothing As It Seems" (Fringe)
