= Karen Hicks =

American political operative

Karen Hicks is a Democratic political operative specializing in campaign field strategy and organization.

Hicks attended the University of North Carolina at Chapel Hill. Hicks has held positions in a variety of political organizations and campaigns, including Executive Director of New Hampshire Citizen Action (1993–1997), and Political Director for Jeanne Shaheen's gubernatorial (2000) and U.S. Senate (2002) bids. She also served as Shaheen's Health Policy Advisor (2000-2002).

Hicks rose to national prominence during the 2004 Democratic presidential primary when she served as the New Hampshire State Director for Governor Howard Dean's campaign. Her tactics and exceptional leadership abilities earned her wide acclaim, leading ABC News' political newsletter The Note to comment that, "Karen Hicks has captured lightning in a bottle in New Hampshire for Dr. Dean."

Hicks has worked as Deputy National Field Director for the Democratic National Committee, including John Kerry's presidential campaign in 2004, and for Prime Minister Tony Blair and the Labour Party of Britain (2005). She led the petitioning drive to win Gifford Miller a place on the ballot in the race for Mayor of New York City (2005).

Hicks worked in late 2005 and most of 2006 at Catalist, a national voter database company founded by Harold M. Ickes, which was originally dubbed the Data Warehouse project.

Hicks then joined the Institute of Politics at Harvard University as a resident fellow for the Fall 2006 term. In December 2006, media reports indicated that she would join Hillary Clinton's presidential campaign.
