= Les Hick =

English footballer

Personal information
- Full name: Leslie David Hick
- Date of birth: 23 April 1927
- Place of birth: Acomb, England
- Date of death: 17 December 1970 (aged 43)
- Place of death: Wiltshire, England
- Position: Outside right

Senior career*
Years	Team	Apps	(Gls)
1948–1950	Bradford City	1	(0)
- * Club domestic league appearances and goals

Sgt. Leslie David Hick (23 April 1927 – 17 December 1970) was an English professional footballer who played as an outside right.

== Career ==
Born in Acomb, Yorkshire, Hick signed for Bradford City in July 1948 after playing amateur football for the Army, leaving the club in July 1950. During his time with Bradford City he made one appearance in the Football League.

== Death ==
Hick was later a sergeant in the British Royal Air Force. He was killed in December 1970 in a parachuting accident in Wiltshire. An expert testified at the inquiry into his death that the parachute failed to deploy because of a defect, which led to a rubbing friction that disastrously caused the reserve parachute to fail.

== Sources ==
- Frost, Terry (1988). Bradford City A Complete Record 1903-1988. Breedon Books Sport. ISBN 0-907969-38-0.
