= Denis Higgs =

British mathematician (1932–2011)

Denis A. Higgs
- Born: 6 May 1932; England
- Died: 25 February 2011 (aged 78); Toronto, Canada
- Education: University of Cambridge, University of the Witwatersrand, McMaster University
- Known for: Category theory Combinatorics; Universal algebra
- Scientific career
- Fields: Mathematics
- Workplaces: University of the Witwatersrand, University of Cambridge, University of Waterloo
- Thesis: Matroids on Complete Boolean Algebras (1970)
- Doctoral advisor: Gert Sabidussi

Denis A. Higgs (6 May 1932 – February 25, 2011) was a British mathematician, Doctor of Mathematics, and professor of mathematics who specialised in combinatorics, universal algebra, and category theory. He wrote one of the most influential papers in category theory entitled A category approach to boolean valued set theory, which introduced many students to topos theory. He was a member of the National Committee of Liberation and was an outspoken critic against the apartheid in South Africa.

== Life ==
He earned degrees from Cambridge University, St John's College, in England, University of the Witwatersrand in South Africa, and McMaster University in Canada.

In 1962, he became a member of the National Committee of Liberation, a movement whose main objective was to dismantle the apartheid in South Africa.

On 28 August 1964, he was kidnapped from his home in Lusaka, Zambia. Then South Africa's Justice Minister John Vorster, who later became Prime Minister, denied any involvement by either the South African government or the police, but accused Higgs of being an accessory to the bombing that killed Ethel Rhys and wounded many others.

On 1 September, an unidentified man who claimed to be part of British Protectorates called the Rand Daily Mail newspaper and gave specific details of Denis Higgs's whereabouts. On 2 September, police authorities found him. He was blindfolded and bound in a van over by the Zoo Park area. Although Higgs was wanted for the Johannesburg railway bombing that killed Rhys, authorities declined to prosecute since Higgs had been returned to South Africa via an extrajudicial kidnapping rather than proper extradition channels.

After first leaving South Africa to return to Zambia, on 6 September 1964, Higgs fled to London, accompanied by his family. He later stated that he feared for his safety and that of his family, since a day before his departure, the South African government had begun proceedings of extradition for his alleged participation in the explosion at the Johannesburg Railway Station that killed Rhys.

== Career ==
He emigrated to Canada in 1966, earning a doctorate from McMaster, and held a position as a professor of Pure Mathematics at the University of Waterloo, where he wrote one of the most influential papers in category theory entitled A category approach to boolean valued set theory, which introduced many students to topos theory.

In 1973, he generalised the Rasiowa-Sikorski Boolean models to the case of category theory.

His academic papers were published in Algebra Universalis, the Journal of Pure and Applied Algebra, the Journal of the Australian Mathematical Society, the Journal of the London Mathematical Society, and Mathematics of Computation, among other journals.

He died on 25 February 2011.

== Academic publications ==
- Denis Higgs (1989). "Nuclearity in the category of complete semilattices". Journal of Pure and Applied Algebra. 57 (1): 67–78. doi:10.1016/0022-4049(89)90028-5.
- Don Brunker; Denis Higgs (1989). "Constructions of Σ-groups, relatively free Σ-groups". Journal of the Australian Mathematical Society. 46 (1): 8. doi:10.1017/S1446788700030354.
- Denis Higgs (1989). "Remarks on duality for $\Sigma$-groups: Banach and Hilbert spaces". Advances in Mathematics. 76 (2): 230–244. doi:10.1016/0001-8708(89)90052-2.
- Denis Higgs (1988). "Σ-Groups as Convergence Groups". Mathematische Nachrichten. 137 (1): 101–112. doi:10.1002/mana.19881370110.
- Denis Higgs (1986). "Lattices of crosscuts". Algebra Universalis. 23 (1): 10–18. doi:10.1007/BF01190905. S2CID 120728413.
- Denis Higgs (1985). "A companion to Grillet's Theorem on maximal chains and antichains". Order. 1 (4): 371–375. doi:10.1007/BF00582742. S2CID 119825698.
- J. E. Baumgartner; P. Erdős; D. Higgs (1984). "Cross-cuts in the power set of an infinite set". Order. 1 (2): 139–145. doi:10.1007/BF00565649. S2CID 10469116.
- D. Handelman; D. Higgs; J. Lawrence (1980). "Directed Abelian Groups, Countably Continuous Rings, and Rickart C*-Algebras". Journal of the London Mathematical Society. s2-21 (2): 193–202. doi:10.1112/jlms/s2-21.2.193.
- D. Higgs (1978). "A Universal Characterization of [0, ∞]". Indagationes Mathematicae (Proceedings). 81 (1): 448–455. doi:10.1016/S1385-7258(78)80035-3.
- John E. Blackburn; Henry H. Crapo; Denis A. Higgs (1973). "A Catalogue of Combinatorial Geometries". Mathematics of Computation. 27 (121): 155. doi:10.2307/2005258. JSTOR 2005258.
- John E. Blackburn; Henry H. Crapo; Denis A. Higgs (1973). "A catalogue of combinatorial geometries". Mathematics of Computation. 27 (121): 155. doi:10.1090/S0025-5718-1973-0419270-0.
- Denis Higgs (1971). "Remarks on residually small varieties". Algebra Universalis. 1 (1): 383–385. doi:10.1007/BF02944997. S2CID 121609538.
- Denis Higgs (1971). "Lattices isomorphic to their ideal lattices". Algebra Universalis. 1 (1): 71–72. doi:10.1007/BF02944957. S2CID 120657722.
- Denis Higgs (1970). "Boolean-valued equivalence relations and complete extensions of complete boolean algebras". Bulletin of the Australian Mathematical Society. 3 (1): 65–72. doi:10.1017/S0004972700045652.
- Denis Higgs (1985). "Interpolation antichains in lattices". Universal Algebra and Lattice Theory. Lecture Notes in Mathematics. Vol. 1149. pp. 142–149. doi:10.1007/BFb0098461. ISBN 978-3-540-15691-8.
