= Ken Higgs (Canadian football) =

Canadian football player

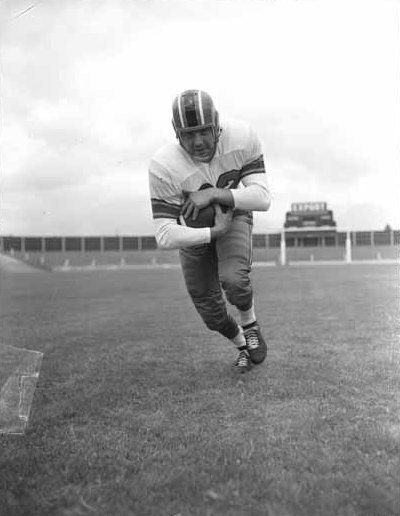
- Ken Higgs in 1955

Profile
- Position: Halfback

Personal information
- Born: January 12, 1930; Vancouver, British Columbia, Canada
- Died: December 14, 2002 (aged 72); Victoria, British Columbia, Canada
- Listed height: 5 ft 11 in (1.80 m)
- Listed weight: 185 lb (84 kg)

Career history
- 1955–1956: BC Lions

Kenneth W. Higgs (January 12, 1930 – December 14, 2002) was a Canadian professional football player who played for the BC Lions.
