= Colin Fry =

English television personality (1962–2015)

- Born: 19 May 1962; Haywards Heath, Sussex, England
- Died: 25 August 2015 (aged 53); Sussex, England
- Occupation: Spiritualist medium

Colin Fry (19 May 1962 – 25 August 2015) was an English television personality, entertainer and self-proclaimed medium. He consistently professed his beliefs as a psychic and garnered a following across his career, whilst critics said his capabilities came from cold reading.

== Life and career ==
Colin Fry was born on 19 May 1962 in Haywards Heath, Sussex. He claimed to have discovered psychic ability from the age of four when he told his grandfather that his mother had “died and gone to heaven”. The next day his grandfather received a telegram that said his mother had died.

He hosted a number of television programmes dealing with the supernatural, including: Most Haunted, Psychic Private Eyes and 6ixth Sense with Colin Fry, produced by Living TV. Fry, who at one time performed under the stage name of "Lincoln", was exposed in 1992 when during a séance the lights were unexpectedly turned on and he was seen holding a spirit trumpet in the air, which the audience had been led to believe was being levitated by spiritual energy.

In April 2015, Fry was diagnosed with terminal lung cancer. He died in Sussex on 25 August 2015, at the age of 53.
