= Mount Hicks (Nevada) =

Mountain in western Nevada, USA

Coordinates: 38°16′49″N 118°49′02″W

Mount Hicks is a summit in the U.S. state of Nevada. The elevation is 9,373 feet (2,857 m).

Mount Hicks was named after E. R. Hicks, a prospector.
