= Billy Hicks =

American sport shooter (1927–2016)

Billy G. Hicks
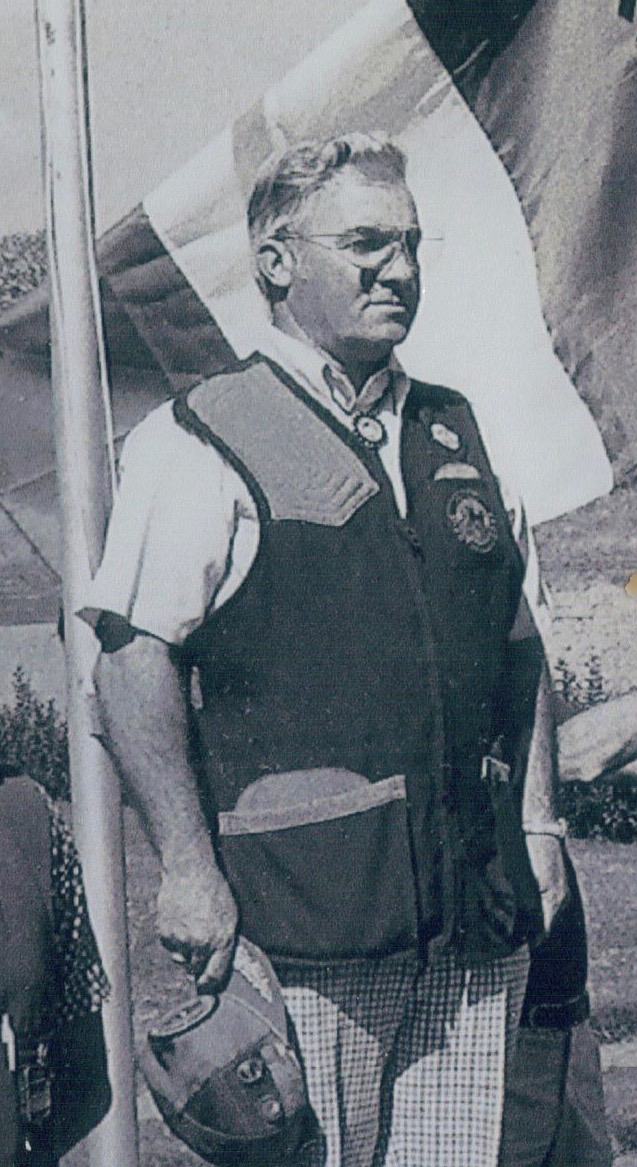
- Billy G. Hicks September 1981 World Flyer Championships
- Born: May 29, 1927; Echols, Kentucky, U.S.
- Died: October 7, 2016 (aged 89); Winchester, Virginia, U.S.
- Military career
- Branch: United States Marine Corps
- Service years: 1945–1971
- Rank: First Sergeant
- Unit: 6th Marine Division
- Conflicts: World War II, Korean War, Vietnam War
- Awards: Navy Commendation Medal; Combat Action Ribbon; Meritorious Unit Commendation; World War II Victory Medal; China Service Medal; Korean Service Medal; Vietnam Service Medal; United Nations Medal; Vietnam Gallantry Cross; Vietnam Campaign Medal; Marksmanship Badge

Billy Gene Hicks (May 29, 1927 – October 7, 2016) was an American moving target shooter who distinguished himself in competitions around the world and the United States from 1955 to 1981. He was considered to be one of the foremost moving target shooters in the world.

== Early life and education ==
Billy G. Hicks was born in Echols, Kentucky, on May 29, 1927. He grew up poor living in rural western Kentucky with his mother and father, brother and two sisters. His father earned a meager living through the 1930s as an electrician for the Louisville Gas and Electric company. Billy was a victim of Polio in his early childhood years but later recovered having only a slight difference in his stance, with his left leg being shorter than the right. He attributed his success in shooting later in his professional career with his early hunting trips as a boy with his father, shooting quail in Central City Kentucky. Hicks was extremely proficient with not only the pistol and rifle but was also deadly accurate with hitting moving targets. Early jobs prior to his military and shooting careers included working part-time for the local mining company in Central City Kentucky, working above the mines and in them. Other early jobs included working for a pharmacy and delivering milk. It was his proficiency with firearms that would end up taking him farther than he ever dreamed possible.

== Military career ==
Hicks' military career started in 1945 when he was drafted into service as a U.S. Marine. He served with the Marine 6th Division in Sing Tau China until the end of World War II. After the war he returned to Kentucky and his home town for a brief period of time. He was drafted again for service when the Korean War broke out and decided to stay in the Marines.

Not long after the Korean War ended, his shooting career began. Hicks began shooting Trap and Skeet in 1955 while stationed in Hawaii, and achieved his AA (Master Class) rating the same year which was almost unheard of. He quickly began moving up the ranks entering into shooting competitions and by 1963 he had achieved over 48 career wins. While stationed in California working as a U.S. Marine Corps Drill Instructor, Billy competed across the state in shooting competitions often against hundreds of other shooters, and began making headlines in Southern California news papers. He entered into large professional competitions sometimes going up against movie stars like Roy Rogers and Robert Stack. It was not unusual for him to enter into a Trap or Skeet competition against 150 or more shooters, and come out with top honors. By 1965 he felt there was nothing more for him to achieve in the amateur competitions and began training on Olympic Trap and Skeet ranges, where there are 12 traps and targets travel at 90+ miles an hour. He wanted to earn a spot on the United States International Team.

Billy earned the praises of the Commandant of the Marine Corps for his consistent display of shooting prowess, and he soon caught the attention of the International Shooting Team thereafter. Billy along with a select other few were invited to participate in team trials. He had to prove to them that he could shoot consistently and with the same accuracy in order to earn a spot on the 4 man team. He traveled to Quantico Virginia to try out for the U.S. team, and destroyed 195x200 targets during his first Olympic Trap trial. In Fredericksburg on the second test – he knocked down 99x100. The third and final test came at the 27th annual North-South Championships in Washington DC. Bill was now part of a "trial" international team of five and together they disintegrated 542x550 birds and won every contest. The local paper headline the next day read “Hicks was picking off skeet like John Wayne picks off Indians during a wagon train attack. He busted 95x100..to capture the first place honors.” The final 4 man international team was then picked, and Billy had earned his place on the prestigious team.

As a member of the United States World Championship Trap and Skeet Team in 1966 Hicks' hit ratio on moving targets was 98.8%, and he was considered to be one of the United States Marine Corps' best Olympic clay target shooters. In a competition where the shooter has a little less than 3 seconds to fire and hit Hicks had proven that he could perform consistently under pressure.

In 1966, the US team won the gold and top honors at the Olympic Trap World Championships in Wiesbaden, Germany. The team consisted of Billy G. Hicks, Gordon Horner, Charles Jenson, and Ken Jones. Hicks' shot down 288x300 targets in this event. He was awarded the highest military badge for any American shooter, the U.S. International Distinguished Shooter Badge (his number is #100).

In 1967, Hicks again joined the United States Team at Bologna Italy with James Beck, Chris Bishop, and Richard Loffelmacher. The US Team won the silver and bronze that year, with Hicks registering a score of 274x300.

In late 1968 his shooting career was put on hold when he received orders to Vietnam. Hicks reported to H&MS 39 in Quảng Trị Province for combat support operations. While there he was instrumental in the realignment of the H&MS-39 provisional organizational structure by recommending delineations of responsibility and assignments of specific tasks, thereby promoting more effective operations. He directed a concentrated effort to enhance the morale and welfare of the squadron. Despite the constant pulse of combat support operations, 1stSgt Hicks in his spare time supervised the layout and construction of the Provisional Marine Air Group 39 Skeet Range which was the only one of its kind in Northern I Corps. It opened for operation in March 1969. In his spare time he continued to manage the range for six months to promote off-duty recreational activity.

== National Records ==
On May 19, 1968, Billy G. Hicks became the first American to ever fire a perfect 200 x 200 straight in Olympic trap at the Preliminary Olympic International Clay Pigeon Competition in Thurmont, Maryland.

On September 7, 1970, he was awarded an NRA certificate in recognition of a National Record (co-holder open and co-holder service records) in a clay pigeon 300 target event, with a score of 294x300 straight at Ft. Benning, Georgia.

== Later life and death ==
At the end of the 1960s and his military shooting career, Hicks held multiple gold, silver, and bronze medals in International Shooting awarded at both the Wiesbaden and Bologna ISSF events. He held a National Record 200x200 straight in Olympic Trap, and was the co-holder of a second National Trap Record of 294x300 straight. He had been awarded the highest achievement medal in shooting the International Distinguished Shooters Badge

In 1971 Hicks retired from the U.S. Marine Corps, and began a second career as a shooting instructor at Rolling Rock Club in Ligonier, Pennsylvania. He continued to compete in the ATA circuit periodically to keep his skills sharp. He was awarded the South Eastern States Clay Pigeon Championship – NRA Civilian Champion Award in 1972.

In 1981 not being one to sit on the sidelines – Hicks entered himself in professional competition once again at the Live Bird World Championships in Guadalajara, Mexico, against 600 of the best moving target shooters from all over the world in a "miss and out" competition, you miss once and you're out of the competition. In just three days, all 600 shooters had been eliminated except for Billy G. Hicks (United States), Carlo Giogretti (Italy), and Butch Riechoff (United States). Riechoff missed his 53rd bird, and left Hicks and Giogretti competing for the World Championship. Hicks missed his 54th bird placing second in the World Competition.

He returned to Rolling Rock Club and opened a children's shooting program to perpetuate the sport, where he taught hundreds of young men and women ages 12–18 how to shoot Skeet and Trap until his retirement. This was something that was very close to his heart and he enjoyed very much. During his career as a professional shooting instructor he designed and built many shooting facilities both at Rolling Rock Club and for other private enterprises, including Duck Towers, Quail Walks, Live Bird Ranges, and culminating with a full size Olympic Trap Range for Rolling Rock Club as his parting gift.

Hicks retired from Trap and Skeet shooting in 1988 and moved to Spring Hill Florida where he spent many happy years with his family and his wife of 64 years Barbara Jean. When asked how he got to be one of the best moving target shooters in the world he replied – "I just kept practicing until I mastered it.".

Billy died on October 7, 2016, from complications due to congestive heart failure.

=== Affiliations and awards ===
1964 National Rifle Association of America, International Skeet – Distinguished Expert Certification

1966 Member- United States World Championship Trap and Skeet Team

1966 ISSF World Shooting Championships [Wiesbaden, Germany) – Gold Medal / Silver Medal / Bronze Medal (288x300)

1966 Military All-American Skeet Team Sports Afield

1966 National Rifle Association of America – Shotgun Distinguished Expert Certification

1966 International Distinguished Shooters Badge #100 [awarded]

1967 Member- United States World Championship Trap and Skeet Team

1967 ISSF World Shooting Championships [Bologna, Italy] – Silver Medal / Bronze Medal (274x300)

1968 (NRA) National Record Holder [a first National Record] – Olympic International Clay Pigeon Competition (200x200) Perfect Score – Thurmont, Maryland [May 19, 1968]

1968 National Rifle Association of America – Master Classification for NRA International Clay Pigeon Competition – Certified Lifetime Master

1968 All-State Skeet Team Virginia

1969 All-State Skeet Team Virginia

1970 NSSA World Champion

1970 (NRA) National Record Holder [Co-Holder] – Clay Pigeon 300 Target (Score 294) – Inter Service Clay Pigeon Tournament, Fort Benning, Georgia [September 7–11, 1970]

1971 All-State Skeet Team Virginia

1981 – World Champion Live Moving Target Championship Guadalajara Mexico [U.S. Grand Prix March 2, 1981]
