= Hicks Creek (Texas) =

- Location within Texas Location within the United States

Physical characteristics
- Source
  - coordinates: 29.8524414°N 99.1705948°W
- Mouth
  - coordinates: 29.7477235°N 99.1578156°W

Hicks Creek is a stream in Bandera County, Texas, in the United States.

Hicks Creek (originally Coker creek) was renamed in the 1850s for a pioneer settler.

== See also ==
- List of rivers of Texas
