= Hix, McDowell County, West Virginia =

Hix
- Unincorporated community
- Location within the state of West Virginia Hix (the United States)
- Coordinates: 37°13′29″N 81°38′1″W
- Country: United States
- State: West Virginia
- County: McDowell
- Elevation: 1,654 ft (504 m)
- Time zone: UTC-5 (Eastern (EST))
  - Summer (DST): UTC-4 (EDT)
- ZIP codes: 25968
- GNIS ID: 1689245

Hix is a ghost town in McDowell County, West Virginia. Hix is located approximately 1.47 miles (2.37 km) north of the West Virginia–Virginia border.
