= Henry Tempest Hicks =

Brigadier-General Henry Tempest Hicks CB JP
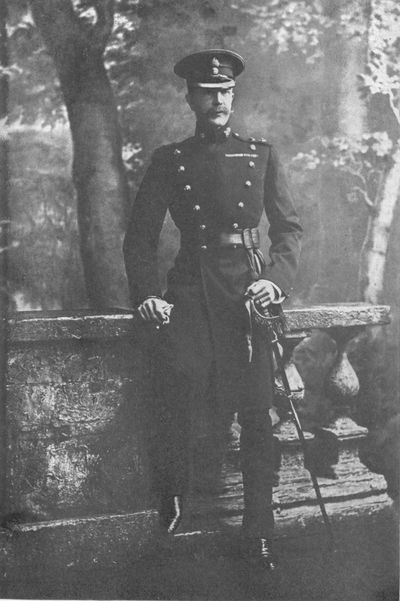
- Born: 25 November 1852
- Died: 10 November 1922 (aged 69)

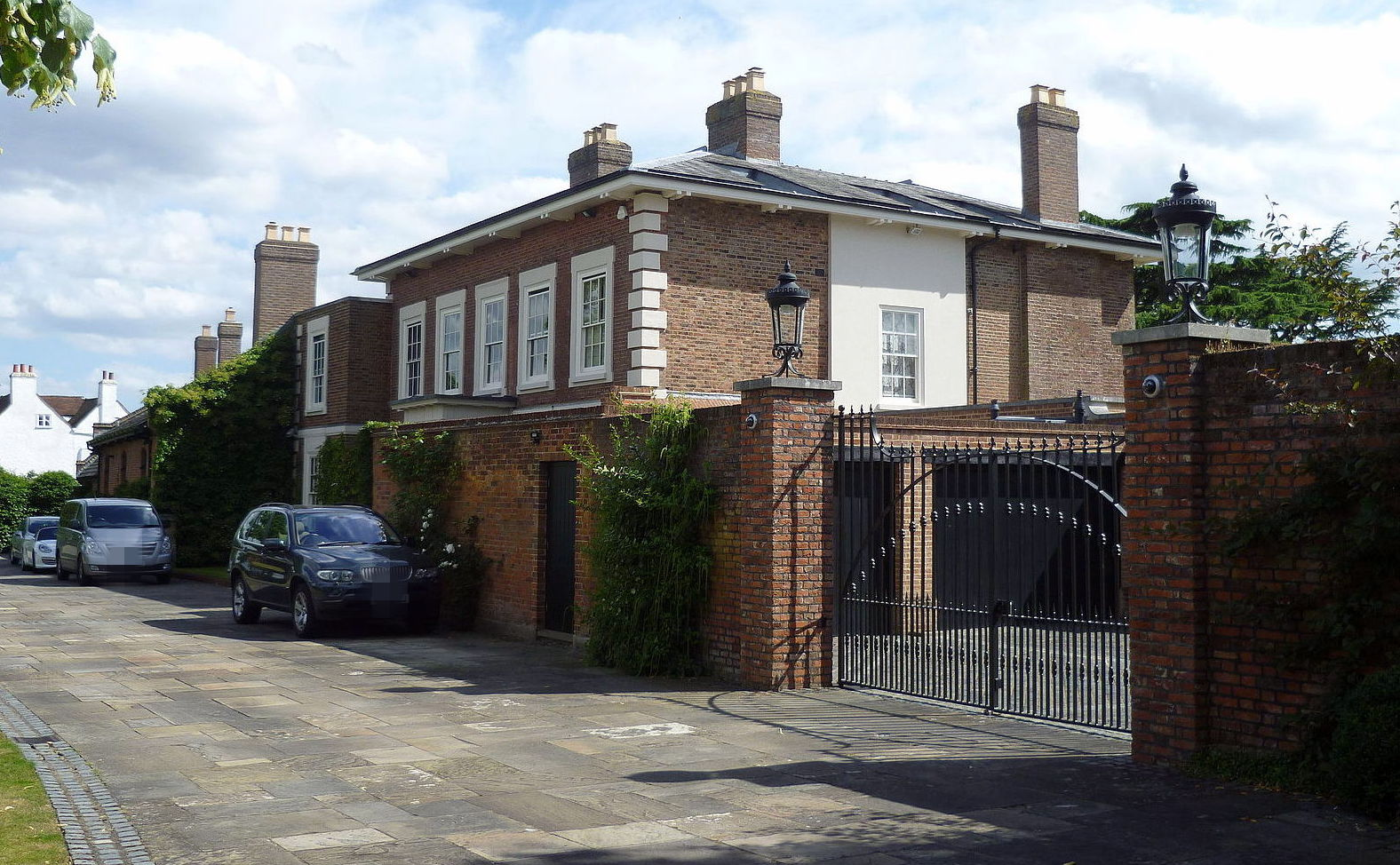
Gladsmuir, Monken Hadley, today. The former home of Tempest-Hicks.

Brigadier-General Henry Tempest Hicks CB JP (25 November 1852 – 10 November 1922) was a British Army officer who served in the South African War and was mentioned in despatches three times and subsequently made a Companion of the Order of the Bath. He later served in Aden.

== Early life ==
Tempest Hicks was born in 1852, the son of George H. Tempest Hicks of Hillgrove, Wells. He was educated at Harrow School and the University of Cambridge.

== Military career ==
Tempest Hicks served in the South African War in command of the 2nd Royal Dublin Fusiliers. He was mentioned in despatches three times and subsequently made a Companion of the Order of the Bath. He later served in Aden. He reached the rank of brigadier general. In 1907, Hicks's address was given as Gladsmuir, Monken Hadley.

== Family ==
Hicks married in 1885 Anna Clara Georgina Hemery, daughter of Charles Hemery of Monken Hadley. The couple had children Captain Charles Edward Henry Tempest-Hicks, who died in action 1918, and Anne Monica Georgiana Tempest-Hicks, who married Thomas Hall Rokeby Plumer, 2nd Viscount Plumer, son of Field Marshal Herbert Charles Onslow Plumer, 1st Viscount Plumer, in 1919. Anne died 2 May 1963.
