= Mount Hicks (New Zealand) =

Mountain in New Zealand

- Saint David's Dome
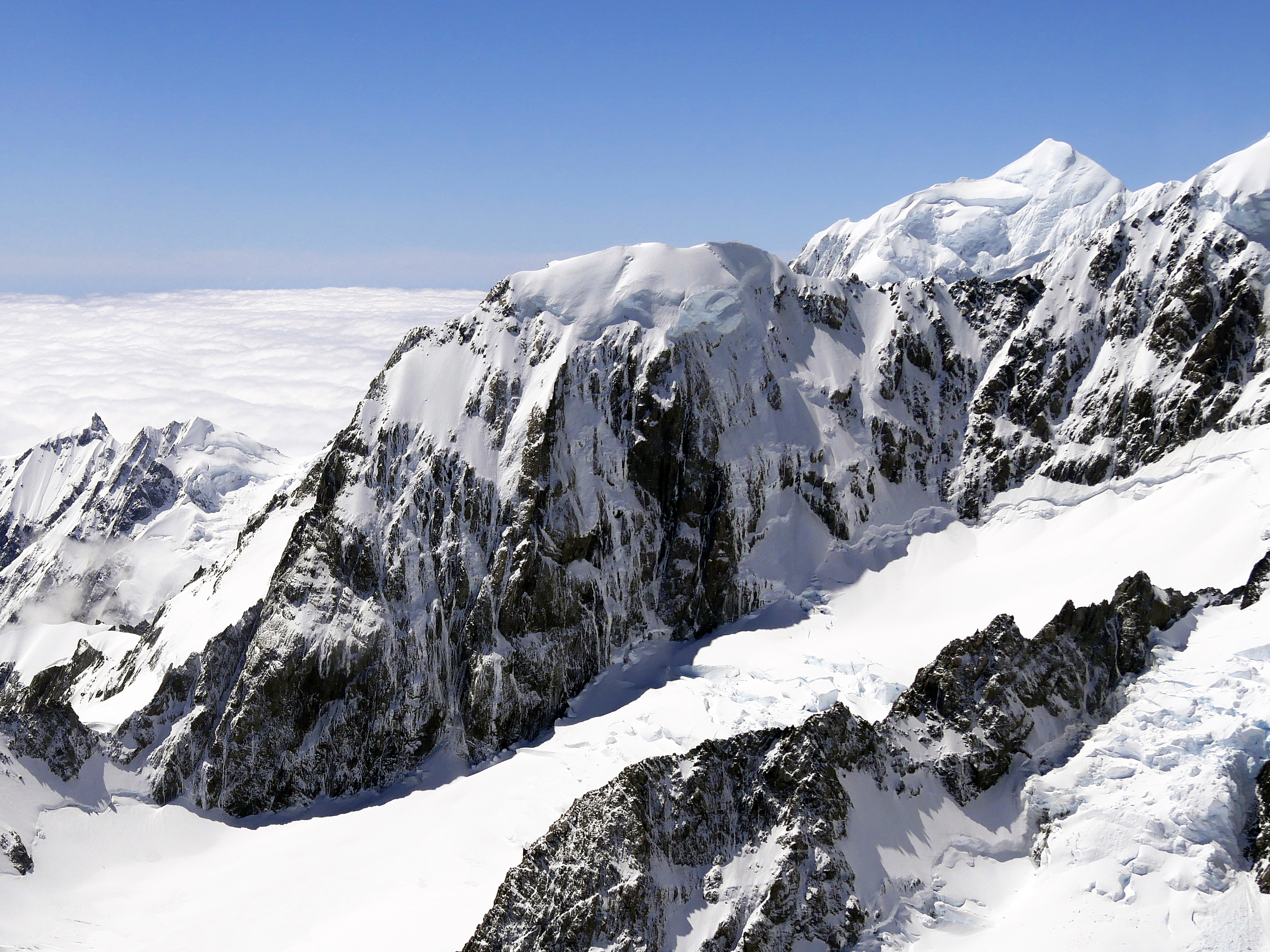
- Mount Hicks in the center of the image, with Mount Vancouver in background

Highest point
- Elevation: 3,198 m (10,492 ft)
- Prominence: 56 m (184 ft)
- Parent peak: Mount Dampier
- Isolation: 0.9 km (0.56 mi)
- Coordinates: 43°35′16″S 170°07′44″E

Geography
- Location within New Zealand
- Location: South Island, New Zealand
- Parent range: Southern Alps

Climbing
- First ascent: February 9, 1906 by Newton, Low und Alec Graham

Mount Hicks (also known as Saint David's Dome) is a mountain in the Southern Alps in Aoraki / Mount Cook National Park on the South Island of New Zealand. The mountain is 3,198 metres (10,492 ft) high. It is above the Hooker Glacier, in the vicinity of Aoraki / Mount Cook.

The mountain was first ascended in 1906. The starting point for ascents is the Empress hut. From the south face of Mount Hicks there are several possible routes, including the Dingle-Button route.
