= Hix, Summers County, West Virginia =

Hix
- Unincorporated community
- Location within the state of West Virginia Hix (the United States)
- Coordinates: 37°43′48″N 80°49′10″W
- Country: United States
- State: West Virginia
- County: Summers
- Time zone: UTC-5 (Eastern (EST))
  - Summer (DST): UTC-4 (EDT)

Hix is an unincorporated community in Summers County, West Virginia, United States. It lies to the northeast of the city of Hinton, the county seat of Summers County. Its elevation is 2,618 feet (798 m). At some point, Hix possessed a post office, which closed on December 6, 1975.
