= Bill Hicks (footballer) =

Australian rules footballer

Personal information
- Full name: William Hicks
- Born: 18 September 1899
- Died: 21 September 1962 (aged 63)
- Height: 169 cm (5 ft 7 in)

Playing career^{1}
Years	Club	Games (Goals)
1921–22	Fitzroy	4 (0)
- ^{1} Playing statistics correct to the end of 1922.

Bill Hicks (18 September 1899 – 21 September 1962) was an Australian rules footballer who played with Fitzroy in the Victorian Football League (VFL).
