= Kenneth Higgs =

English cricketer

Personal information
- Full name: Kenneth Alan Higgs
- Born: 5 October 1886; Haywards Heath, Sussex, England
- Died: 21 January 1959 (aged 72); Haywards Heath, Sussex, England
- Batting: Right-handed
- Bowling: Unknown

Domestic team information
- Years: Team
- 1920–1927: Sussex

Career statistics
Competition	First-class
Matches	41
Runs scored	1,693
Batting average	25.66
100s/50s	2/13
Top score	111
Balls bowled	211
Wickets	4
Bowling average	32.75
5 wickets in innings	–
10 wickets in match	–
Best bowling	2/15
Catches/stumpings	20/–
- Source: Cricinfo, 29 June 2013

Kenneth Alan Higgs (5 October 1886 – 21 January 1959) was an English first-class cricketer active in the 1920s who made over forty appearances for Sussex. Born at Haywards Heath, Sussex, Higgs was a right-handed batsman. He was known as "the Haywards Heath amateur" and was a corn merchant by profession (Jenner & Higgs).

== Career ==
Prior to playing first-class cricket, Higgs served in the British Army during World War I, with a Kenneth Alan Higgs mentioned in the London Gazette on 24 August 1915, as serving with the rank of private in the 16th (County of London) Battalion, with this date coinciding with his promotion to 2nd Lieutenant. Following the war, Higgs resigned his commission in August 1920. It was in that same year that he made his first-class debut for Sussex against Worcestershire in the County Championship at Hove, during which he achieved the feat of making a century on his first-class debut, scoring 101 in Sussex's first-innings, a batting performance which Wisden later described as "flawless". He made five further first-class appearances in 1920, scoring a total of 345 runs at an average of 38.33, which besides his century also included two fifties.

Continuing his good form into the following season, he made nine first-class appearances, scoring 425 runs at an average of 26.56, which included two half centuries, and a second first-class century, scored against Warwickshire at Hove. His century came in a two-hour partnership of 188 for the third wicket with Jack Malden. He made nine first-class appearances for the county in the following season, though met with less success than in his previous two seasons, averaging 17.28 for his 242 runs, with three half centuries and a high score of 62. He played his greatest quantity of first-class matches in 1923, with eleven appearances all made in the County Championship. He equalled the success of his first two seasons in 1923, scoring 474 runs at an average of 27.88, though he failed to record a century, he did however make four half centuries. Higgs played just five first-class matches in 1924, scoring 199 runs with two half centuries. He didn't make any first-class appearances in 1925 or 1926, with his final first-class match coming in 1927, in what was his only appearance in that seasons County Championship against Warwickshire at Cricket Field Road, Horsham. Higgs made a total of 41 first-class appearances for Sussex, scoring 1,693 runs at an average of 25.65, with his score of 111 against Warwickshire being his highest. He also made thirteen half centuries. Although not the oldest man to make a hundred on his first-class debut, he is the oldest (at 33 years and 254 days) to have done so in the English County Championship.

Higgs later became the Vice-President of Sussex County Cricket Club. He died at the town of his birth on 21 January 1959.
