= Plimsoll =

Plimsoll may refer to:

- Plimsoll (surname)
- A symbol (⦵ or ~~o~~) that is used as a superscript in the notation of thermodynamics to indicate a specific arbitrarily chosen non-zero reference point (standard state).
- Plimsoll line or Plimsoll mark on a ship's hull, named after Samuel Plimsoll
- Plimsoll shoe, which is named for the shoe's horizontal lines, which resemble the Plimsoll line

== See also ==
- The Plimsouls, an American rock band.
