= 1880 Oxford by-election =

UK parliamentary by-election

The 1880 Oxford by-election was held in May 1880 due to the incumbent Liberal MP William Vernon Harcourt becoming Home Secretary and seeking re-election to Parliament. Harcourt was defeated.

== Background ==
Harcourt had been one of the two MPs for Oxford since 1868 and had developed a reputation as a skilled debater but without tact. In the 1880 general election he had narrowly beaten his Conservative fellow MP, Alexander William Hall. Harcourt's campaign, particularly his acceptance speech, were regarded as insulting.

== Campaign ==
The Liberals formed a government and Harcourt was invited to be Home Secretary which meant that he would have to resign his seat and seek re-election.

Hall fought a vigorous campaign getting endorsements from A. E. Housman and the Prime Minister's son, Sir Robert Peel. Harcourt accused Hall of being a pawn to the brewing lobby. The rhetoric of the campaign meant that the atmosphere was highly charged.

== Result ==
In a closely fought election Harcourt lost to Hall. Harcourt lost by 2,681 votes to Hall's 2,730.

1880 Oxford by-election (1 seat)
Party	Candidate	Votes	%	±%
Conservative	Alexander William Hall	2,735	50.5	+17.7
Liberal	William Vernon Harcourt	2,681	49.5	−17.7
Majority		54	1.0	N/A
Turnout		5,416	87.9	−0.2
Registered electors		6,163		
Conservative gain from Liberal		Swing	+17.7	

== Aftermath ==
Harcourt found another seat when Samuel Plimsoll immediately resigned and Harcourt was unopposed in the subsequent by-election for Derby.

There were irregularities in the conduct of the election and the election was deemed void. Hall was unseated and the seat was left vacant until 1885. In 1885 Hall won the seat again and held it until 1892.
