= Plimsoll Memorial =

Memorial in London, England

Coordinates: 51.5053°N 0.1231°W

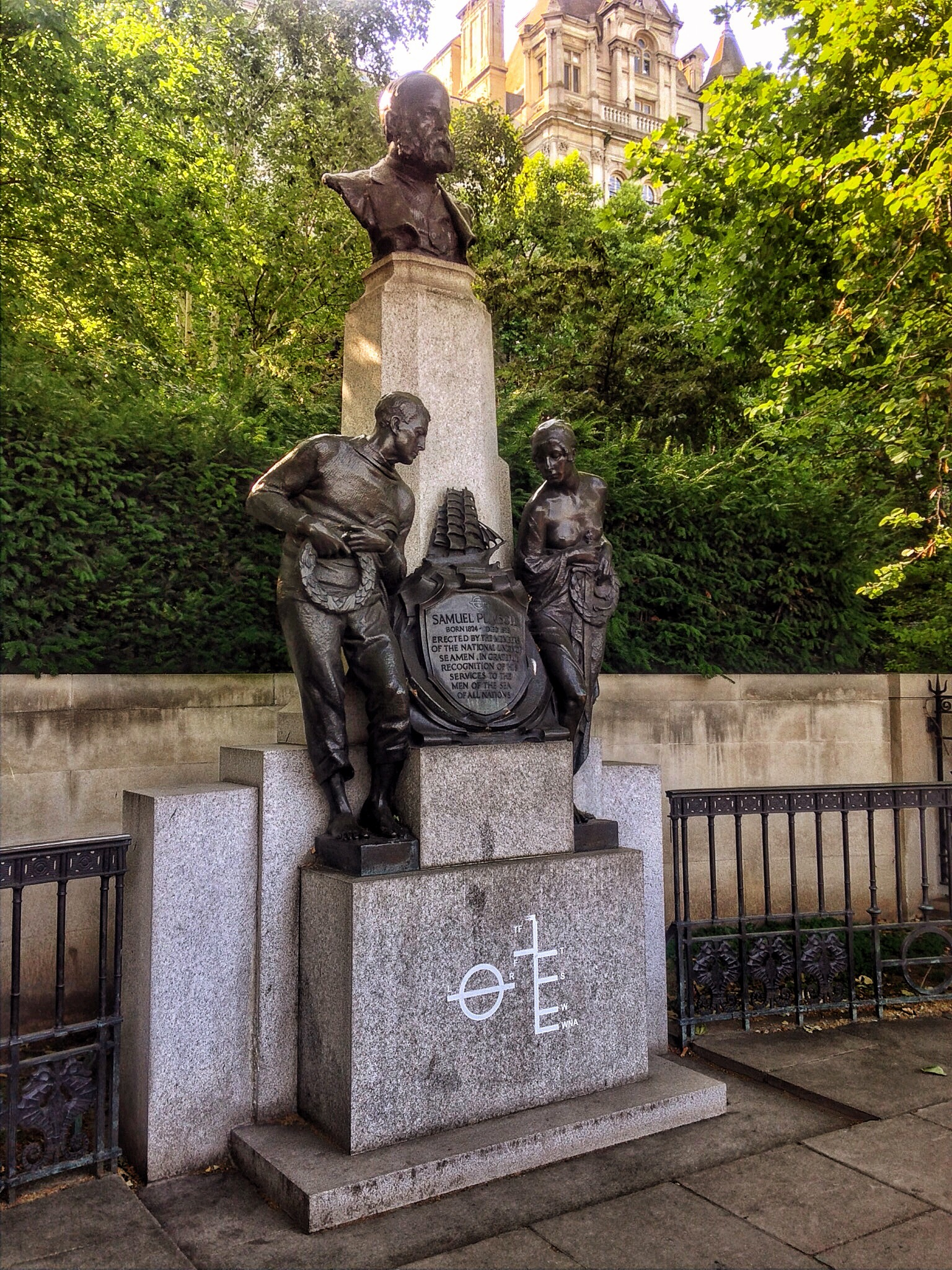
- Artist: Ferdinand Blundstone
- Completion date: 1929
- Subject: Samuel Plimsoll
- Location: London

Listed Building – Grade II
- Official name: Plimsoll Memorial
- Designated: 5 February 1970
- Reference no.: 1274547

The Plimsoll Memorial is a Grade II listed memorial to Samuel Plimsoll on the Victoria Embankment in Westminster, London. It was erected in 1929 and sits just outside the Victoria Embankment Gardens.

The memorial was designed by Ferdinand Blundstone. It includes a bust of Plimsoll who served as an MP, being first elected in 1868, and aimed to tackle issues surrounding shipping. He is known for his namesake plimsoll line which was instituted as part of the Merchant Shipping Act 1876, his campaigning for such safety measures earned him the nickname of 'the Sailors' Friend'. Plimsoll would also become first president of the National Union of Seamen which would erect the monument in his honour. Its design incorporates various sailing motifs including a painted example of the plimsoll line.
