= Waterline =

Line where the hull of a ship meets the surface of the water

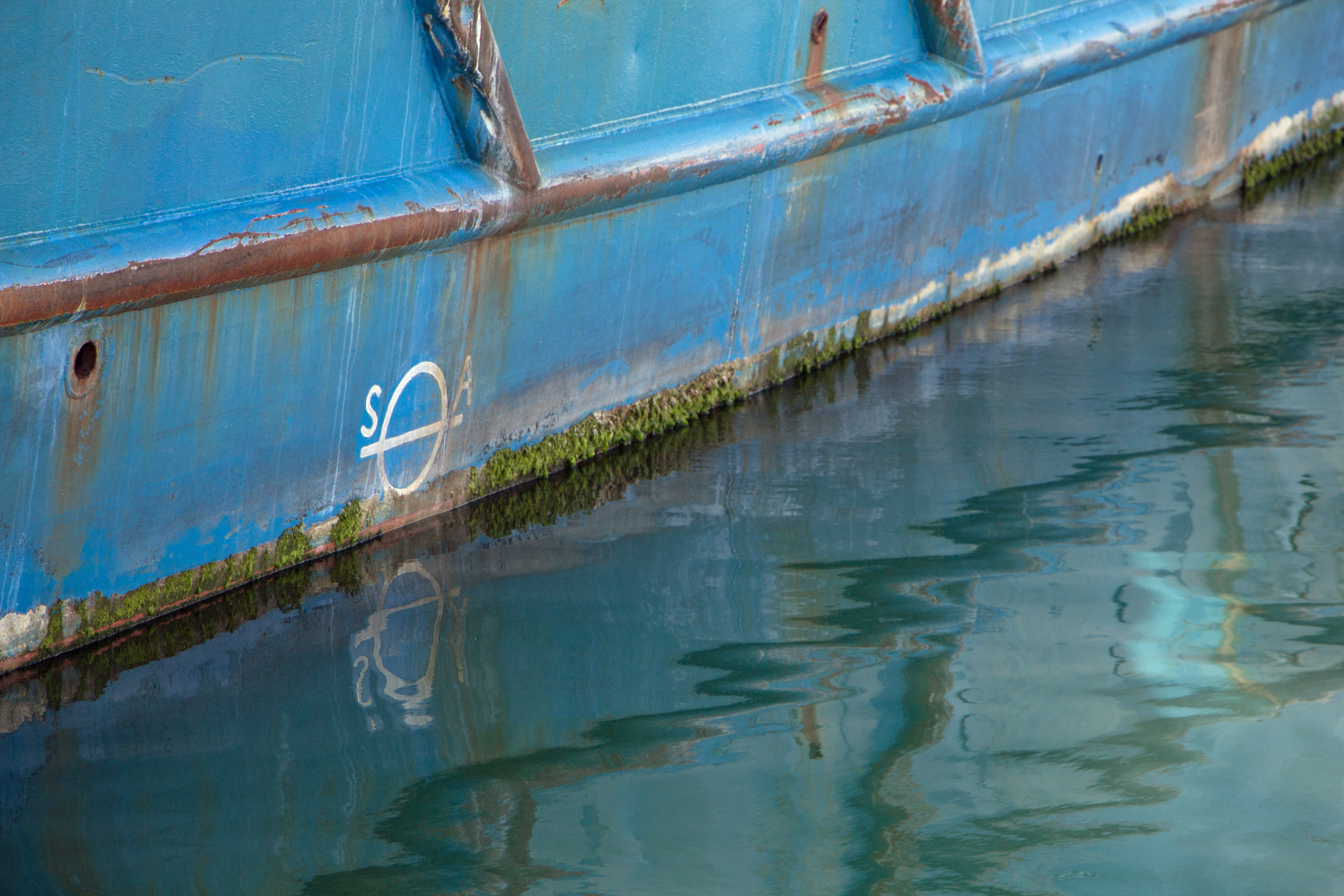
Waterline of a ship. The mark above the waterline indicates the Plimsoll line

The waterline is the line where the hull of a ship meets the surface of the water.

A waterline can also refer to any line on a ship's hull that is parallel to the water's surface when the ship is afloat in a level trimmed position. Hence, waterlines are a class of "ships lines" used to denote the shape of a hull in naval architecture lines plans.

The load line (also known as Plimsoll line) is the waterline which indicates the legal limit to which a ship may be loaded for specific water types and temperatures in order to safely maintain buoyancy.

For vessels with displacement hulls, the hull speed is defined by, among other things, the waterline length. In a sailing boat, the waterline length can change significantly as the boat heels, and can dynamically affect the speed of the boat.

== Aircraft ==
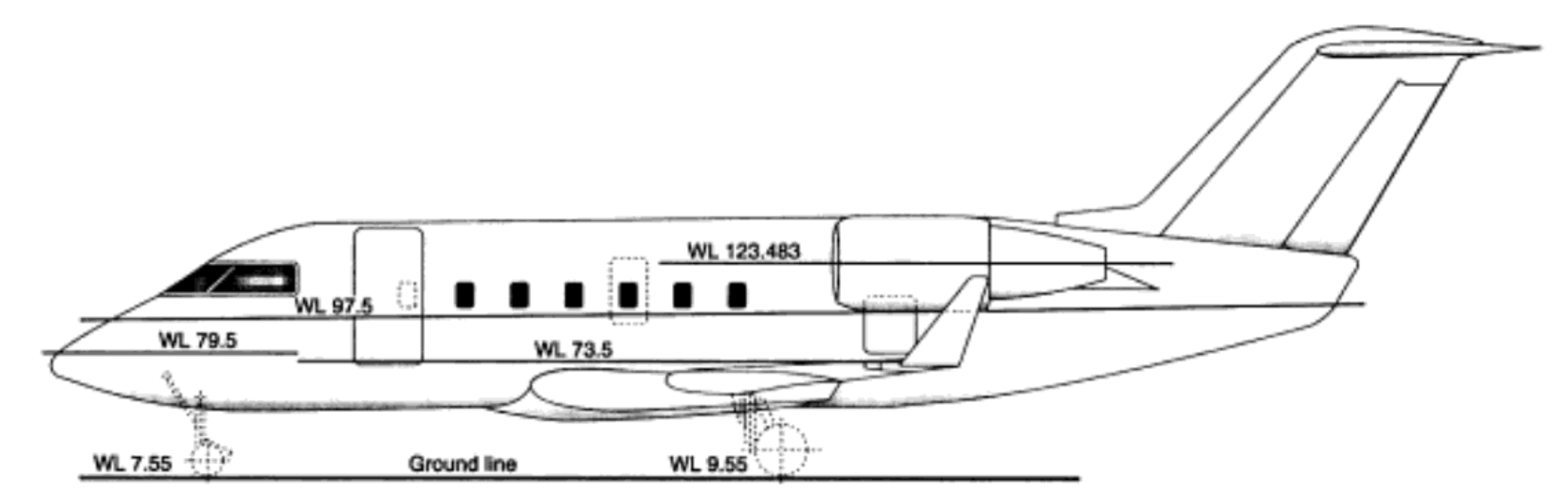
Water lines on a scheme of a fuselage. Baseline is at the ground line, all WL values are nonnegative

Per the US Air Force Airframe Maintenance and Repair Manual (1960), a horizontal waterline extends from the nose cone of the aircraft to the exhaust cone. The base line of the aircraft is designated as waterline 0 (zero). The location of this base line varies on different types of aircraft. However. the planes of all waterlines above and below the zero waterline are parallel. The waterline number (WL or W.L.) in the US is expressed in inches, values increase upwards. Two typical alignments for the base line are the tip of the nose (negative WL are possible) or the "nominal ground plane" (measurements will be nonnegative).

== See also ==
- Waterline length

== Sources ==
- Takahashi, T. (2017). Aircraft Performance and Sizing, Volume I: Fundamentals of Aircraft Performance. Momentum Press. ISBN 978-1-60650-684-4.
- Kerchove, René de baron (1961). International Maritime Dictionary: An Encyclopedic Dictionary of Useful Maritime Terms and Phrases, Together with Equivalents in French and German (2 ed.). Van Nostrand Reinhold. ISBN 978-0-442-02062-0. OCLC 1039382382.
- United States. Air Force (1960). Air Force AFM. Department of the Air Force.
