= 1874 Oxford by-election =

UK Parliamentary by-election

The 1874 Oxford by-election was fought on 16 March 1874. The by-election was fought due to the elevation to the peerage of the incumbent Liberal MP, Edward Cardwell. It was won by the Conservative candidate Alexander William Hall.

1874 Oxford by-election (1 seat)
Party	Candidate	Votes	%	±%
Conservative	Alexander William Hall	2,554	55.0	+22.7
Liberal	John Delaware Lewis	2,092	45.0	−22.7
Majority		462	10.0	N/A
Turnout		4,646	81.8	+2.5
Registered electors		5,680		
Conservative gain from Liberal		Swing	+22.7	
