= William Harcourt (politician) =

British politician (1827–1904)

The Right Honourable Sir William Harcourt KC
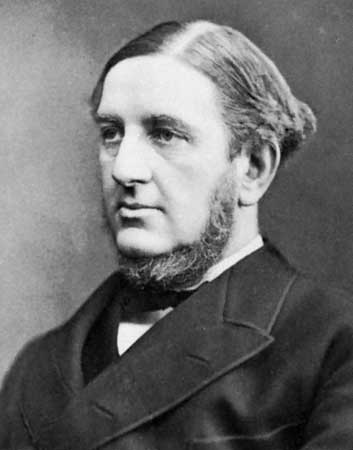

Leader of the Opposition
- In office 6 October 1896 – 8 December 1898
- Preceded by: The Earl of Rosebery
- Succeeded by: Sir Henry Campbell-Bannerman

Chancellor of the Exchequer
- In office 18 August 1892 – 21 June 1895
- Prime Minister: William Ewart Gladstone; The Earl of Rosebery
- Preceded by: George Goschen
- Succeeded by: Sir Michael Hicks Beach, Bt
- In office 6 February 1886 – 20 July 1886
- Prime Minister: William Ewart Gladstone
- Preceded by: Sir Michael Hicks Beach, Bt
- Succeeded by: Lord Randolph Churchill

Home Secretary
- In office 28 April 1880 – 23 June 1885
- Prime Minister: William Ewart Gladstone
- Preceded by: R. A. Cross
- Succeeded by: R. A. Cross

Personal details
- Born: 14 October 1827
- Died: 1 October 1904 (aged 76)
- Party: Liberal
- Spouse(s): (1) Maria Theresa Lister (d. 1863) (2) Elizabeth Cabot Motley (d. 1928)
- Children: 3, including Lewis and Robert
- Parent: William Vernon Harcourt (father)
- Relatives: Edward Venables-Vernon-Harcourt (paternal grandfather); George Harcourt (uncle)
- Education: Trinity College, Cambridge

Sir William George Granville Venables Vernon Harcourt KC (14 October 1827 – 1 October 1904) was a British lawyer, journalist and Liberal statesman. He was Member of Parliament for Oxford, Derby, then West Monmouthshire and held the offices of Home Secretary and Chancellor of the Exchequer under William Ewart Gladstone before becoming Leader of the Opposition. A talented speaker in parliament, he was sometimes regarded as aloof and possessing only an intellectual involvement in his causes. He failed to engender much emotional response in the public and became only a reluctant and disillusioned leader of his party.

Historian Roy Jenkins says he was "too much of a party man. In manner and by origin he was a patrician figure, but he saw most issues exclusively in terms of parliamentary infighting… His views were usually much more of a reaction to what his political enemies, in the other party and in his own, were saying than the result of any objective thought. He inspired considerable loyalty among his followers – the Great Gladiator he was sometimes enthusiastically called – but his colleagues, partly as a result of his execrable temperament and his bullying… found him a difficult man with whom to work."

== Family and ancestry ==
Harcourt was the second son of Rev. Canon William Vernon Harcourt, a scientist and owner of Nuneham Park, Nuneham Courtenay, Oxfordshire and his wife Matilda Mary, daughter of Colonel William Gooch. His father was the fourth son and eventually heir of The Most Rev. Edward Harcourt, Archbishop of York and his wife Lady Anne Leveson-Gower. Anne was a daughter of Granville Leveson-Gower, 1st Marquess of Stafford and kinswoman Lady Louisa Egerton. Her maternal grandparents included Scroop Egerton, 1st Duke of Bridgewater and Rachel. Rachel was a daughter of Wriothesley Russell, 2nd Duke of Bedford and the rich heiress Elizabeth, daughter of John Howland of Streatham. William was, due to the family's appendage of a surname to recognise an inheritance, born a Vernon, and his position as a senior heir in the landed Vernon and Harcourt was emphasised by his link to many of the greater English houses, a fact of which he was proud. In later life his descent from the Plantagenets was a joke among his political opponents.

His probate was sworn in the year he died (when he was resident at Nuneham Park and at Malwood in Hampshire) then resworn, over £3000 upward, at ninepence short of £190,265 (equivalent to about £20,000,000 in 2025).

== Education and early life ==
William's childhood was an austere one, educated at home by a Swiss governess, he was sent to a private school at Southwell, Nottinghamshire, when he was eight. William's father denied him a public school education, sending him to be educated in classics at the small class of Rev. John Owen Parr. In 1840, Parr moved to Preston and William witnessed the Preston bread riots there in 1842. He left Parr in 1844 and, after two more years' study at home, William entered Trinity College, Cambridge, to pursue his interest in mathematics. At Cambridge he became an Apostle, and graduated with first-class honours in the classics tripos in 1851, but he did not enjoy the mathematics, graduating only senior optime.

At Cambridge, William rejected his family's Tory instincts and began to write for the Morning Chronicle in support of Sir Robert Peel. William's father encouraged him to seek a Cambridge fellowship or a career in politics but William chose law and journalism. He entered Lincoln's Inn in 1852 and was called to the bar at the Inner Temple in 1854.

He quickly made his mark as a speaker, his reception into London society being eased by his uncle George Harcourt and aunt Frances Waldegrave. From 1855 William started to write for the Saturday Review, becoming increasingly a follower of William Ewart Gladstone and an opponent of Lord Palmerston. He practised in railway law, commentating, especially in The Times on international law. In 1862, he wrote some famous letters to The Times over the signature of "Historicus," supporting Britain's neutrality in the American Civil War and condemning the widespread public sympathy for the Confederate States. He also wrote on the Trent Affair and the Alabama controversy. He became a Queen's Counsel in 1866, and was appointed Whewell professor of international law at the University of Cambridge in 1869.

== Political career ==
Harcourt entered parliament as Liberal member for Oxford, and sat from 1868 to 1880, being appointed Solicitor General and knighted in 1873. He was re-elected in the Liberal victory at the 1880 United Kingdom general election and, though he had not been a strong supporter of Gladstone in opposition, he was appointed Home Secretary. A mandatory re-election was then required on acceptance of such an office and Harcourt was defeated by Alexander William Hall by just 54 votes. Though Hall was then unseated for political corruption, a seat was found for Harcourt at Derby, by the voluntary retirement of Samuel Plimsoll. He continued to co-represent Derby until 1895, when, having been defeated, he found a seat in West Monmouthshire.

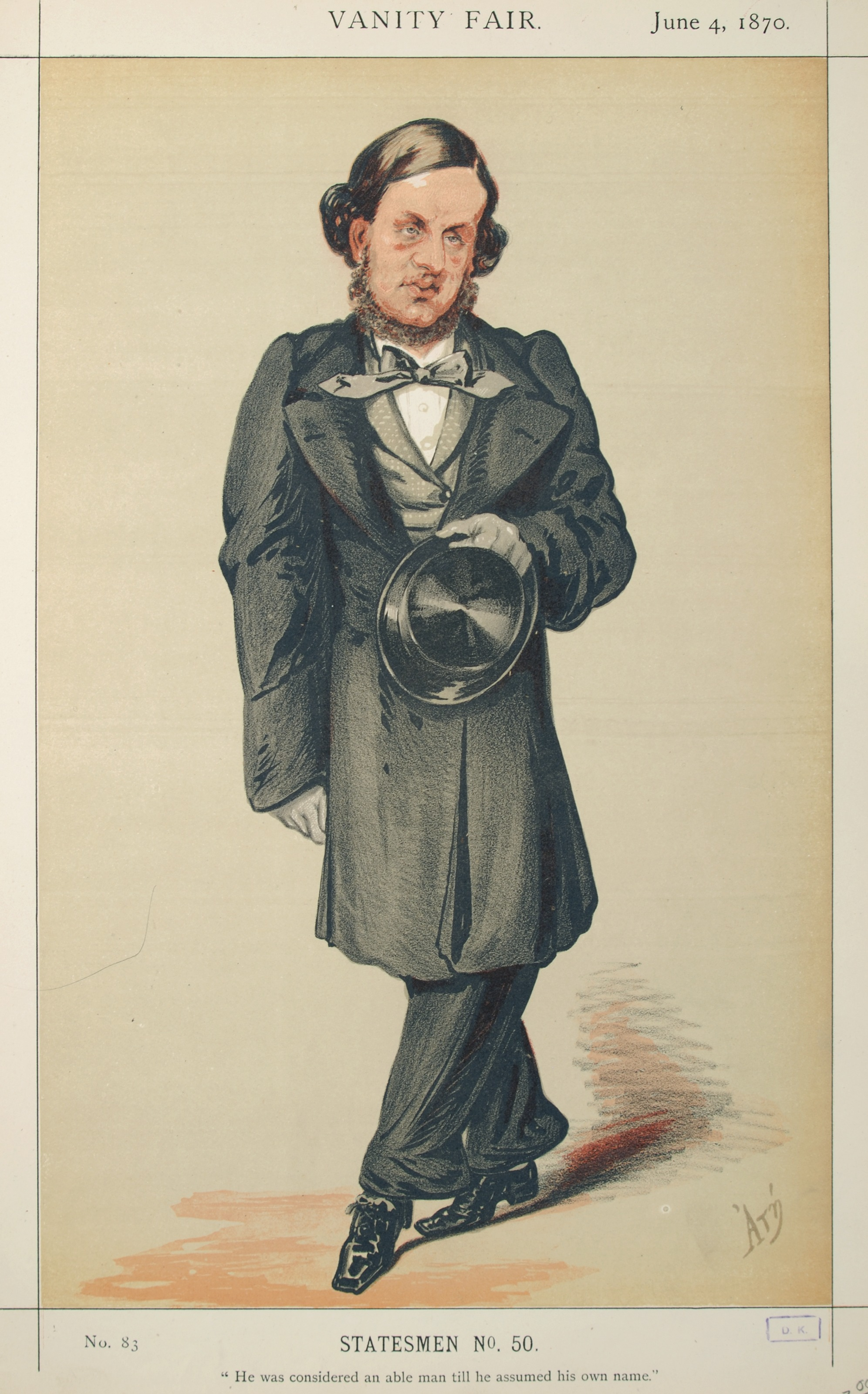
Caricature by ATn published in Vanity Fair in 1870.

His name became connected with the passing of the Ground Game Act 1880 and the Arms (Ireland) Act 1881. As Home Secretary at the time of the Phoenix Park killings and the subsequent London bombings he reacted rapidly, and the Explosive Substances Act 1883 was passed through all its stages in the shortest time on record. His robust stand on law and order brought him into conflict with the Irish members. In 1884 he introduced an aborted bill for unifying the municipal administration of London, and led the demand for a prosecution in the survival cannibalism case of Dudley and Stephens, but also advised the Queen to grant clemency, to six months' in prison. In 1885 he similarly saw commutation of John 'Babbacombe' Lee's death penalty to life imprisonment after his execution failed three times. He was further the victim of the embarrassing stunts of the Harcourt interpolation and the Home Office Baby.

=== Chancellor of the Exchequer ===
He was recognised as one of the ablest and most effective leaders of the Liberal party and when, after a brief interval in 1885, Gladstone returned to office in 1886, Harcourt was made Chancellor of the Exchequer, an office which he again filled from 1892 to 1895. Between 1880 and 1892 Harcourt acted as Gladstone's political deputy. A first-rate party fighter, his services were of huge value. However, in spite of his great success as a platform speaker, he was generally felt to be speaking from an "advocate's brief", and did not impress the public as a conviction politician. It was he who coined the phrase about "stewing in Parnellite juice", and, when the split came in the Liberal party on the Irish question, even those who gave Gladstone and John Morley the credit of being convinced Home Rulers could not be persuaded that Harcourt had followed anything but the line of party expediency.

Sir William Harcourt c1895

In 1894 he introduced and carried a memorable budget, which equalised the death duties on real and personal property. After Gladstone's retirement in 1894 and Lord Rosebery's selection as prime minister, Harcourt became the leader of the Liberal party in the House of Commons, but it was never probable that he would work comfortably in the new conditions. He had been ignored as Gladstone's successor, and it was evident that Rosebery's ideas of Liberalism and of the policy of the Liberal Party were not those of Harcourt. Their differences were patched up from time to time, but the combination was unstable. However the one significant legacy of the government was the introduction of a high uniform rate of death duties in Harcourt's 1894 budget. Harcourt himself was a second son, and thus unlikely to ever have to pay such duties himself, so it was often quipped that this introduction was a "second son's revenge". However, this proved to not be the case, when Harcourt inherited the Nuneham Park estate in Oxfordshire.

=== Leader of the Opposition ===
At the 1895 elections it was clear that there were divisions as to what issue the Liberals were fighting for. The effect of Harcourt's aborted Local Veto Bill, which would have given parishes the right to vote on the closure of all local public houses, on the election was seen not only in his defeat at Derby, which gave the signal for the Liberal rout, but in the set-back it gave to temperance legislation. Though returned for West Monmouthshire (1895, 1900), Harcourt's speeches in debate only occasionally showed his characteristic spirit, and it was evident that for the hard work of opposition he no longer had the same motivation as of old. In October 1896 Gladstone, in his last public speech, called for action to support the Armenians who were being massacred by their Ottoman rulers. Harcourt backed Gladstone but Rosebery used the incident as an excuse to resign as Leader of the Opposition and Harcourt became an unenthusiastic leader.

During Harcourt's period as leader of the Liberal party in the House of Commons, the all-House enquiry into the failed Jameson Raid took place. Harcourt's performance in the enquiry disillusioned sections of the Liberal party, as the Opposition let the Conservative government off the hook by not exposing the involvement of the Colonial Secretary Joseph Chamberlain in the raid's genesis and preparation, Harcourt instead settling for censure of the Prime Minister of the Cape Colony, Cecil Rhodes.

In December 1898 the crisis arrived and, with Morley, Harcourt retired from the party and resigned his Leadership of the Opposition, alleging as his reason, in letters to Morley, the cross-currents of opinion among his old supporters and former colleagues. The split excited considerable comment, and resulted in much heart-searching and a more or less open division between the section of the Liberal party following Rosebery and those who disliked his imperialism.

Though now a private member, Harcourt still continued to assert his independent position, and his attacks on the government were no longer restrained by any deference to Liberal Imperialism. He actively intervened in 1899 and 1900, strongly condemning the government's financial policy and their attitude towards the Transvaal. Throughout the Second Boer War he lost no opportunity of criticising the South African developments in a pessimistic vein. A great parliamentary debater, he sprinkled his speeches with humour. From 1898 to 1900 he was conspicuous, both on the platform and in letters to The Times, in demanding active measures against Ritualism in the Church of England. However, his attitude in this was reflected in his political advocacy of disestablishment. In March 1904, just after he had announced his intention not to seek election again to parliament, he succeeded, by the death of his nephew, to the family estates at Nuneham. He found that the estate was in crisis, especially after having to pay the death duties he himself had introduced, and he died suddenly there in the same year.

Harcourt was offered a peerage in 1902 but he declined it in order to stay in the House of Commons, and to allow his son to advance his political career.

== Marriages and children ==
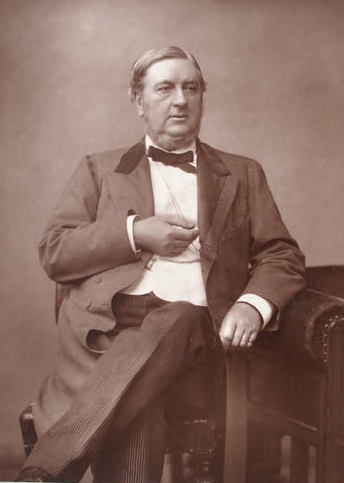
Sir William Harcourt in 1890.

On 5 November 1859, Harcourt married his first wife Maria Theresa Lister, known as Therese. She was a daughter of novelist Thomas Henry Lister and Lady Maria Theresa Villiers. They had two children:

- Julian Harcourt (6 October 1860 – 2 March 1862).
- Lewis Harcourt, 1st Viscount Harcourt (31 January 1863 – 24 February 1922). Originally christened Reginald, but rechristened at the age of two months. Lewis Harcourt served as Private Secretary to his father and later became a prominent politician in his own right, most notably as Secretary of State for the Colonies from 1910 to 1915.

His first wife died on 1 February 1863, only a day after giving birth to their second and last son. Harcourt remained a widower for thirteen years. On 2 December 1876, he married his second wife Elizabeth Cabot Motley. Elizabeth was a daughter of American historian John Lothrop Motley and his wife Mary Benjamin. Her maternal uncle Park Benjamin was a patent lawyer and writer on scientific subjects. She had been previously married to naval officer Thomas Poynton Ives. Ives was among the casualties of the American Civil War. By this second marriage, Harcourt had his third and final son:

- Robert Harcourt (born 7 May 1878). He married Marjorie Laura Cunard. Their daughter Mary Elizabeth Harcourt married Ian Rochfort Johnston, a Commander of the Royal Navy.

== Publications ==
- Letters by Historicus on some Questions of International Law: reprinted from 'The Times' with considerable additions. London and Cambridge: Macmillan and Co. 1863 – via Internet Archive.
- American Neutrality by Historicus: Reprinted from the London "Times" of December 22nd, 1864. New York: New York. 1865 – via Internet Archive.

== Popular culture ==
- Harcourt was the subject of several parody novels based on Alice in Wonderland, such as Caroline Lewis's Clara in Blunderland (1902) and Lost in Blunderland (1903).

== See also ==
- Harcourt interpolation

== Notes ==
Parliament of the United Kingdom
Preceded by Charles Neate; Edward Cardwell	Member of Parliament for Oxford; 1868–1880; With: Edward Cardwell 1868–1874; Alexander William Hall 1874–1880; Joseph William Chitty 1880	Succeeded by Alexander William Hall; Joseph William Chitty
Preceded by Samuel Plimsoll; Michael Thomas Bass	Member of Parliament for Derby; 1880–1895; With: Michael Thomas Bass 1880–1883; Thomas Roe 1883–1895	Succeeded by Sir Henry Bemrose; Geoffrey Drage
Preceded by Cornelius Warmington	Member of Parliament for West Monmouthshire; 1895–1904	Succeeded by Thomas Richards
Legal offices
Preceded by Sir Henry James	Solicitor General for England and Wales; 1873–1874	Succeeded by Sir Richard Baggallay
Political offices
Preceded by Sir Richard Cross	Home Secretary; 1880–1885	Succeeded by Sir Richard Cross
Preceded by Sir Michael Hicks Beach, Bt	Chancellor of the Exchequer; 1886	Succeeded by Lord Randolph Churchill
Preceded by George Goschen	Chancellor of the Exchequer; 1892–1895	Succeeded by Sir Michael Hicks Beach, Bt
Preceded by William Ewart Gladstone	Leader of the House of Commons; 1894–1895	Succeeded by Arthur Balfour
Preceded by The Earl of Rosebery	Leader of the Opposition; 1896–1898	Succeeded by Sir Henry Campbell-Bannerman
Party political offices
Preceded by William Ewart Gladstone	Liberal Leader in the Commons; 1894–1898	Succeeded by Sir Henry Campbell-Bannerman
Preceded by The Earl of Rosebery	Leader of the British Liberal Party; 1896–1898 with The Earl of Kimberley	Succeeded by Sir Henry Campbell-Bannerman; The Earl of Kimberley
