= Alexander William Hall =

British politician (1838–1919)

Alexander William Hall (20 June 1838 – 29 April 1919) was a British Conservative politician.

Hall was the son of Henry Hall and his wife Catherine Louisa Hood, daughter of Lord Bridport. He was educated at Exeter College, Oxford. In 1862 he inherited the estate of Barton Abbey Steeple Aston. He was J.P., Deputy Lieutenant and High Sheriff of Oxfordshire in 1867.

Hall was elected Member of Parliament for Oxford in 1874. He lost the seat in 1880, but stood again at a by-election later that year. The election was hard-fought and his candidature enthusiastically supported by A. E. Housman. The local councillor and philosopher T. H. Green (1836–82) and others lodged a formal petition due to Hall's use of "bribery and treating, undue influence, and personation" during the election ("Election Petitions", The Times, Saturday, 5 June 1880, iss.29,900, p. 12. The petition appears in full in Jackson's Oxford Journal, Saturday, 12 June 1880, iss.6639, p. 5, col.f.). Hall was unseated and the seat was left vacant until 1885. In 1885 Hall won the seat again and held it until 1892.

Hall married Emma Gertrude Jowett and had several children.

Parliament of the United Kingdom
Preceded by Wiliam Vernon Harcourt; Edward Cardwell	Member of Parliament for Oxford; 1874–1880; With: Wiliam Vernon Harcourt	Succeeded by Wiliam Vernon Harcourt; Joseph William Chitty
Preceded by Wiliam Vernon Harcourt; Joseph William Chitty	Member of Parliament for Oxford; 1880; With: Joseph William Chitty	Succeeded by Joseph William Chitty
Preceded by (seat vacant)	Member of Parliament for Oxford; 1885–1892	Succeeded by George Tomkyns Chesney
