= Reginald Henry Campbell =

British artist

Reginald Henry Campbell (2 December 1874 – 22 January 1962) was a Scottish artist active in Edinburgh, Scotland.

== Biography ==
Campbell was born in Westmorland, to George Alexander Campbell and his wife, Mary Ann.

He studied art at the Royal Scottish Academy and received the Maclaine-Watter’s Medal in 1899, before moving to London.

At the height of his career, Campbell was awarded the Keith Bursary and the Chalmers Jervise Prize. Furthermore, Campbell's works have been exhibited at the Royal Academy, Royal Scottish Academy, Royal Society of Portrait Painters, Society of Scottish Artists, Royal Glasgow Institute of Fine Arts, as well as abroad.

Campbell was responsible for the Ovaltine advertisements in the early 20th century.

Campbell also painted portraits of Walter Runciman, 1st Baron Runciman and Samuel Plimsoll, which can be found today at the British National Maritime Museum.

He died in London in 1962.
