= Plimsoll (surname) =

Plimsoll is a surname. Notable people with the surname include:

- James Plimsoll (1917–1987), Australian diplomat and public servant
- John Plimsoll (1917–1999), South African cricketer
- Samuel Plimsoll (1824–1898), English politician and social reformer
