= 1880 Derby by-election =

UK Parliamentary by-election

The 1880 Derby by-election was held on 26 May when the incumbent Liberal MP Samuel Plimsoll resigned to find a seat for the recently unseated Home Secretary William Vernon Harcourt.

The Liberals had formed a government after winning the 1880 general election and Harcourt, a well known radical and talented debater, had been offered the job of Home Secretary. Under the law at the time he had to resign his seat and seek re-election. In a close fought by-election Harcourt lost his Oxford seat.

Samuel Plimsoll immediately resigned and Harcourt was unopposed in the subsequent by-election.
