= Hamish Imlach =

- Born: 10 February 1940; Calcutta, British India
- Died: 1 January 1996 (aged 55) Motherwell, Scotland
- Genres: Folk
- Occupations: Musician, songwriter
- Instrument: Guitar

Hamish Imlach (10 February 1940 – 1 January 1996) was a Scottish folk singer. Imlach was born in Calcutta to Scottish parents, although he claimed to have been conceived in Glasgow, Scotland. His commercial success was limited, but he influenced many other artists, including most notably John Martyn, Billy Connolly, and Christy Moore. In Central and Northern Europe Imlach enjoyed a strong reputation as a vivid live artist.

== Career ==
He had his biggest hit in the late 1960s with Cod Liver Oil and the Orange Juice, a scurrilous and humorous take on the American gospel standard "Virgin Mary Had a Little Baby" written by Ron Clark and Carl MacDougall. The song was, for a time, banned by the BBC as it was assumed to be full of double meanings, but at one point became the most requested song on British Forces Radio.

In the late 1960s whilst performing at the Manchester Sports Guild, Imlach struck up a conversation with a then little known Christy Moore after noticing their guitar case in the queue outside the venue, which was an uncommon sight in those days, inviting him into the venue as his guest. This encounter lead to a long-time friendship. Whilst touring together for many years after, the pair were heavy drinkers and users of cannabis, Imlach smoking it but Moore only chewing it.

He was described by Ewan McVicar, the Scottish storyteller and singer, as "a raconteur who taught Billy Connolly, a singer who taught Christy Moore, a blues guitarist who taught John Martyn." Imlach was invited to join the Irish trad and folk group The Dubliners. He was also an early anti-nuclear protester, and wrote and performed protest songs as well as comic ones.

After recovering from a serious illness in the 1970s he regularly toured with Iain MacKintosh as well as doing solo tours. For the last 18 months of his professional life, his stage partner was Kate Kramer, a Canadian fiddle player and singer who lived in Scotland, with whom he recorded his last CD, More and Merrier (1996).

== Personal life ==
Hamish Imlach was married to Wilma Dundas, who died on 10 March 2019 and had four children named Mairead, Fiona, Jim and Vhari.

Imlach's health deteriorated again towards the latter part of his life with bronchial troubles and obesity, and he died on 1 January 1996, six weeks short of his 56th birthday. In his 1992 autobiography, Cod Liver Oil and the Orange Juice, co-written with Ewan McVicar, Imlach jested "When I die I want everything to be knackered!"

== Discography ==
- Hamish Imlach (XTRA, 1966)
- Before and After (XTRA, 1967)
- Live (XTRA, 1967)
- The Two Sides of Hamish Imlach (XTRA, 1968)
- Ballads of Booze (XTRA, 1969)
- Old Rarity (XTRA, 1971)
- Fine Old English Tory Times (XTRA, 1972)
- Murdered Ballads (XTRA, 1973)
- Scottish Sabbath (Autogram, 1976)
- A Man's a Man (Autogram, 1978) with Iain MacKintosh
- The Sporting Life (Musikiste, 1981)
- Sonny's Dream (Lismor, 1985)
- Portrait (Musikiste, 1989)
- I Was Born in Glasgow (Gallus Music, 1991)
- Two's Company (Vindaloo Music, 1993) with Muriel Graves
- More and Merrier (Lochshore, 1995) with Muriel Graves and Kate Kramer

== Sources ==
Moore, Christy (2000). One Voice: My Life in Song (1st ed.). London: Hodder & Stoughton. ISBN 978-0-340-76840-2.
