= Cod Liver Oil and the Orange Juice =

Scottish folk song

"Cod Liver Oil and the Orange Juice" is a Scottish folk song written by Ron Clark and Carl MacDougall. It was recorded by Scottish folk singer Hamish Imlach and released in 1966.

The song tells the story of Hairy Mary, a long-haired Gorbals girl, and her dalliance with the song's unnamed protagonist, known only as The Hard Man.

According to the song, the protagonist meets Hairy Mary in the Dennistoun Palais, a dance hall, and he tries various chat-up lines, culminating in an offer to run her home, "I've got a pair of sannies" (sandshoes). In the dunny of her tenement, their love-making is disturbed when her mother goes to the cludgie, and he flees. Hairy Mary searches for The Hard Man, but he has joined the French Foreign Legion. She has a baby, whose father's in the army.

The song was greatly requested on British Forces Radio, but it was banned by the BBC for a short time from such programmes as Two Way Family Favourites due to its innuendoes and possible erotic content.

Scottish singer songwriter Findlay Napier released a version of the song on his 2017 album "Glasgow".

Irish band The Mary Wallopers released a version of the song in 2022.
