= Edward Cardwell, 1st Viscount Cardwell =

British politician (1813–1886)

The Right Honourable The Viscount Cardwell PC FRS
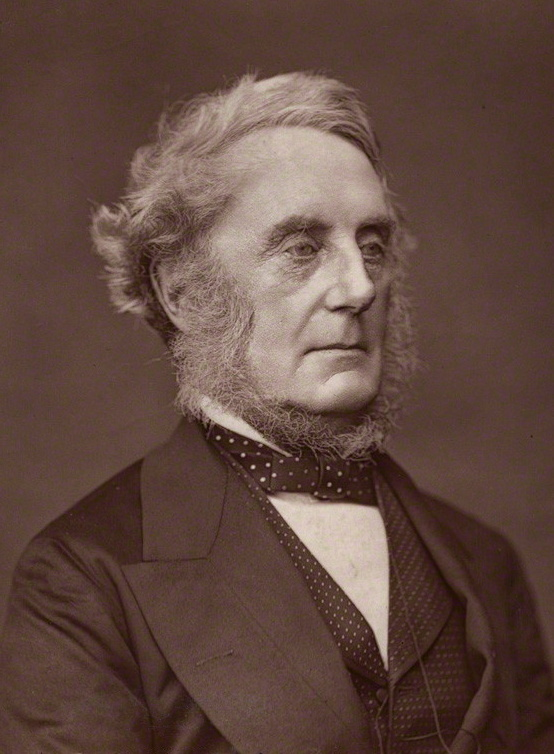
- The 1st Viscount Cardwell, c. 1878

Secretary of State for War
- In office 9 December 1868 – 17 February 1874
- Monarch: Victoria
- Prime Minister: William Ewart Gladstone
- Preceded by: Sir John Pakington, Bt
- Succeeded by: Hon. Frederick Stanley

Secretary of State for the Colonies
- In office 7 April 1864 – 26 June 1866
- Monarch: Victoria
- Prime Minister: The Viscount Palmerston; The Earl Russell
- Preceded by: The Duke of Newcastle
- Succeeded by: The Earl of Carnarvon

Chancellor of the Duchy of Lancaster
- In office 25 July 1861 – 7 April 1864
- Monarch: Victoria
- Prime Minister: The Viscount Palmerston
- Preceded by: Sir George Grey, Bt
- Succeeded by: The Earl of Clarendon

President of the Board of Trade
- In office 28 December 1852 – 31 March 1855
- Monarch: Victoria
- Prime Minister: The Earl of Aberdeen; The Viscount Palmerston
- Preceded by: J. W. Henley
- Succeeded by: The Lord Stanley of Alderley

Personal details
- Born: 24 July 1813
- Died: 15 February 1886 (aged 72) Torquay, Devon
- Party: Tory; Peelite; Liberal
- Spouse: Annie Parker (d. 1887)
- Education: Balliol College, Oxford

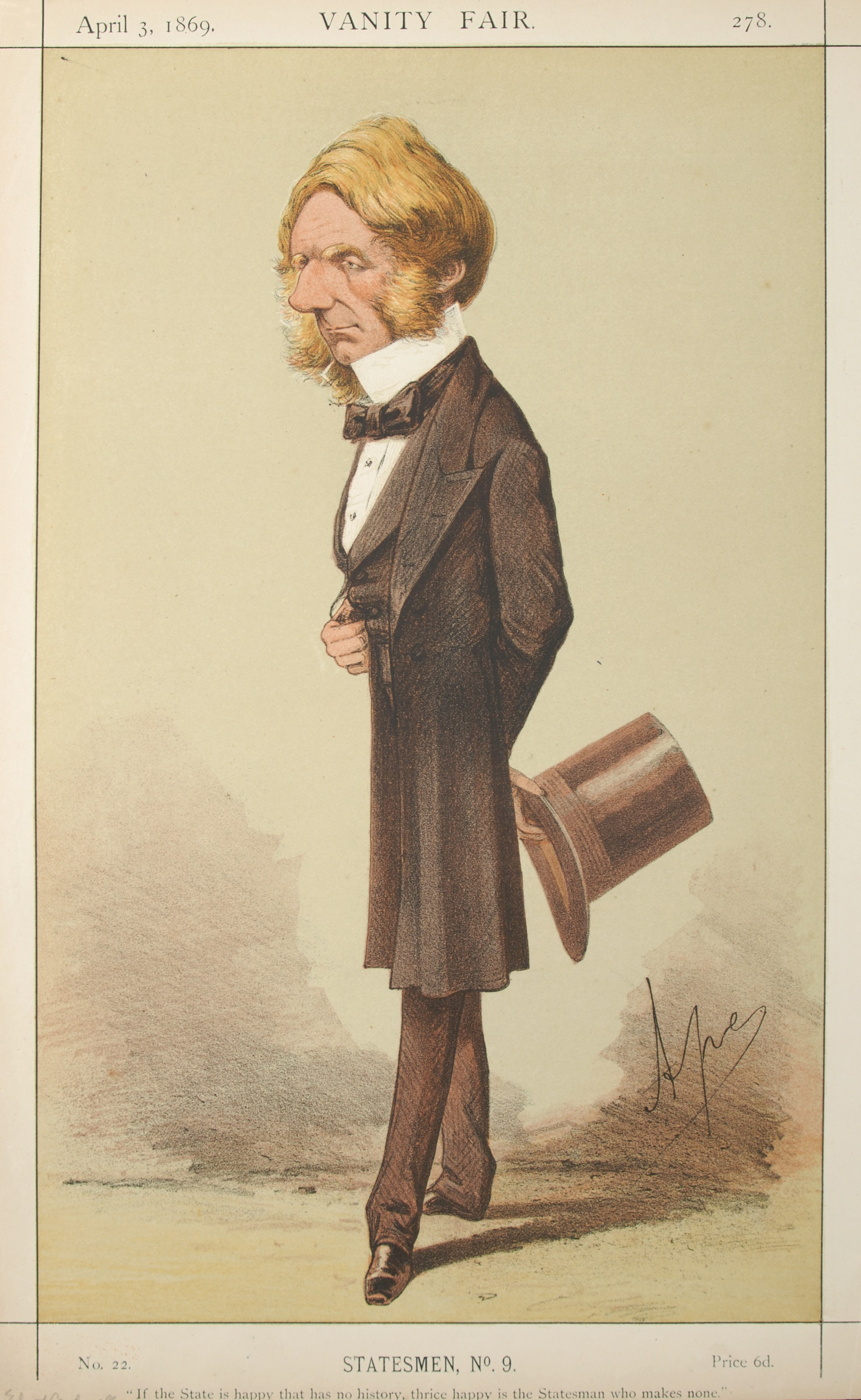
Cardwell caricatured by Ape in Vanity Fair, 1869

Edward Cardwell, 1st Viscount Cardwell, PC, , FRS (24 July 1813 – 15 February 1886) was a British politician in the Peelite and Liberal parties during the middle of the 19th century. He is best remembered for his tenure as Secretary of State for War between 1868 and 1874 and, with William Ewart Gladstone's support, the introduction of the Cardwell Reforms. The goal was to centralise the power of the War Office, abolish purchase of officers' commissions, and to create reserve forces stationed in Britain by establishing short terms of service for enlisted men.

== Background and education ==
Cardwell was the son of John Henry Cardwell, of Liverpool, a merchant, and Elizabeth, daughter of Richard Birley. He was educated at Winchester and Balliol College, Oxford, from where he took a degree in 1835. He was called to the bar, Inner Temple, in 1838.

== Early political career ==
Cardwell was employed in the Colonial Office in the late 1830s, and directly involved in drafting written instructions (sent to Sydney) to Captain William Hobson RN, as to how to 'treat with the natives' (Maori) of New Zealand; He became a follower and confidant of Sir Robert Peel, the Prime Minister, and held his first office under him as Financial Secretary to the Treasury between 1845 and 1846.

When Peel split the Conservative Party in 1846 over the issue of repealing the Corn Laws, Cardwell followed Peel, and became a member of the Peelite faction. When the Peelites came to power in 1852, Cardwell was sworn of the Privy Council and made President of the Board of Trade by Lord Aberdeen, a position he held until 1855.

In 1854 he passed the Railway and Canal Traffic Act 1854 which stopped the cut-throat competition between Railway Companies which was acting to their and the railusers' disadvantage.

== Reelection and return ==
During these years, Cardwell moved from seat to seat in Parliament. In 1847, he was elected as MP for Liverpool.

In 1852, he lost elections for Liverpool and for Ayrshire, but won a seat at Oxford. In 1857, he was defeated for the Oxford seat, but a second election for the seat was held shortly after, which he won (beating William Makepeace Thackeray).

== Liberal MP ==
The Peelite faction disintegrated in the late 1850s and fully integrated with the Whigs. The dissenting factions of the former Tory party and the Whig party combined to found the Liberal Party (UK) and Cardwell officially became a new member of the new Liberal Party in 1859.

=== Palmerston government ===
Cardwell quickly returned to office by joining Lord Palmerston's cabinet as Chief Secretary for Ireland.

Unhappy in that position, he moved two years later to another cabinet post, Chancellor of the Duchy of Lancaster. A second move within the cabinet came in 1864, when Cardwell became the Secretary of State for the Colonies, a position he kept until the Liberals were turned out of office in 1866.

=== Gladstone government ===
When the Liberals returned to power under William Ewart Gladstone in the 1868 election, Cardwell reached the peak of his career, as Gladstone's Secretary of State for War. During his six years in the post, in what became known as "Cardwell reforms", Cardwell reorganised the British army, introduced professional standards for officers (including advancement by merit rather than purchase), and formed a home reserve force. After Gladstone's defeat in the 1874 election, Cardwell was raised to the peerage as Viscount Cardwell, of Ellerbeck in the County Palatine of Lancaster. His ennoblement ended his active political career.

==== Army reform ====
Liberal prime minister William Ewart Gladstone paid little attention to military affairs but he was keen on efficiency. In 1870 he pushed through Parliament major changes in Army organisation. Germany's stunning triumph over France proved that the Prussian system of professional soldiers with up-to-date weapons was far superior to the traditional system of gentlemen-soldiers that Britain used. The reforms were not radical—they had been brewing for years and Gladstone seized the moment to enact them. The goal was to centralise the power of the War Office, abolish purchase of officers' commissions, and to create reserve forces stationed in Britain by establishing short terms of service for enlisted men.

Cardwell as Secretary of State for War (1868–1874) designed the reforms that Gladstone supported in the name of efficiency and democracy. In 1868 he abolished flogging, raising the private soldier status to more like an honourable career. In 1870 Cardwell abolished "bounty money" for recruits, discharged known bad characters from the ranks. He pulled 20,000 soldiers out of self-governing colonies like Canada, which learned they had to help defend themselves.

The most radical change, and one that required Gladstone's political muscle, was to abolish the system of officers obtaining commissions and promotions by purchase, rather than by merit. The system meant that the rich landholding families controlled all the middle and senior ranks in the army. Promotion depended on the family's wealth, not the officer's talents, and the middle class was shut out almost completely. British officers were expected to be gentlemen and sportsmen; there was no problem if they were entirely wanting in military knowledge or leadership skills. From the Tory perspective it was essential to keep the officer corps the domain of gentlemen, and not a trade for professional experts. They warned the latter might menace the oligarchy and threaten a military coup; they preferred an inefficient army to an authoritarian state. The rise of Bismarck's new Germany made this anti authoritarian policy too dangerous for a great empire to risk.

The bill, which would have compensated current owners for their cash investments, passed Commons in 1871 but was blocked by the House of Lords. Gladstone then moved to drop the system without any reimbursements, forcing the Lords to backtrack and approve the original bill. Liberals rallied to Gladstone's anti-elitism, pointing to the case of Lord Cardigan (1797–1868), who spent £40,000 for his commission and proved utterly incompetent in the Crimean war, where he led the disastrous "Charge of the Light Brigade" at the Battle of Balaklava in 1854.

Cardwell was not powerful enough to install a general staff system; that had to await the 20th century. He did rearrange the war department. He made the office of Secretary of State for War superior to the Army's commander in Chief; the commander was His Royal Highness The Duke of Cambridge, the Queen's first cousin, and an opponent of the reforms. The surveyor-general of the ordnance, and the financial secretary became key department heads reporting to the Secretary. The militia was reformed as well and integrated into the Army. The term of enlistment was reduced to 6 years, so there was more turnover and a larger pool of trained reservists. The territorial system of recruiting for regiments was standardised and adjusted to the current population. Cardwell reduced the Army budget yet increased the strength of the army by 25 battalions, 156 field guns, and abundant stores, while the reserves available for foreign service had been raised tenfold from 3,500 to 36,000 men.

== Personal life ==
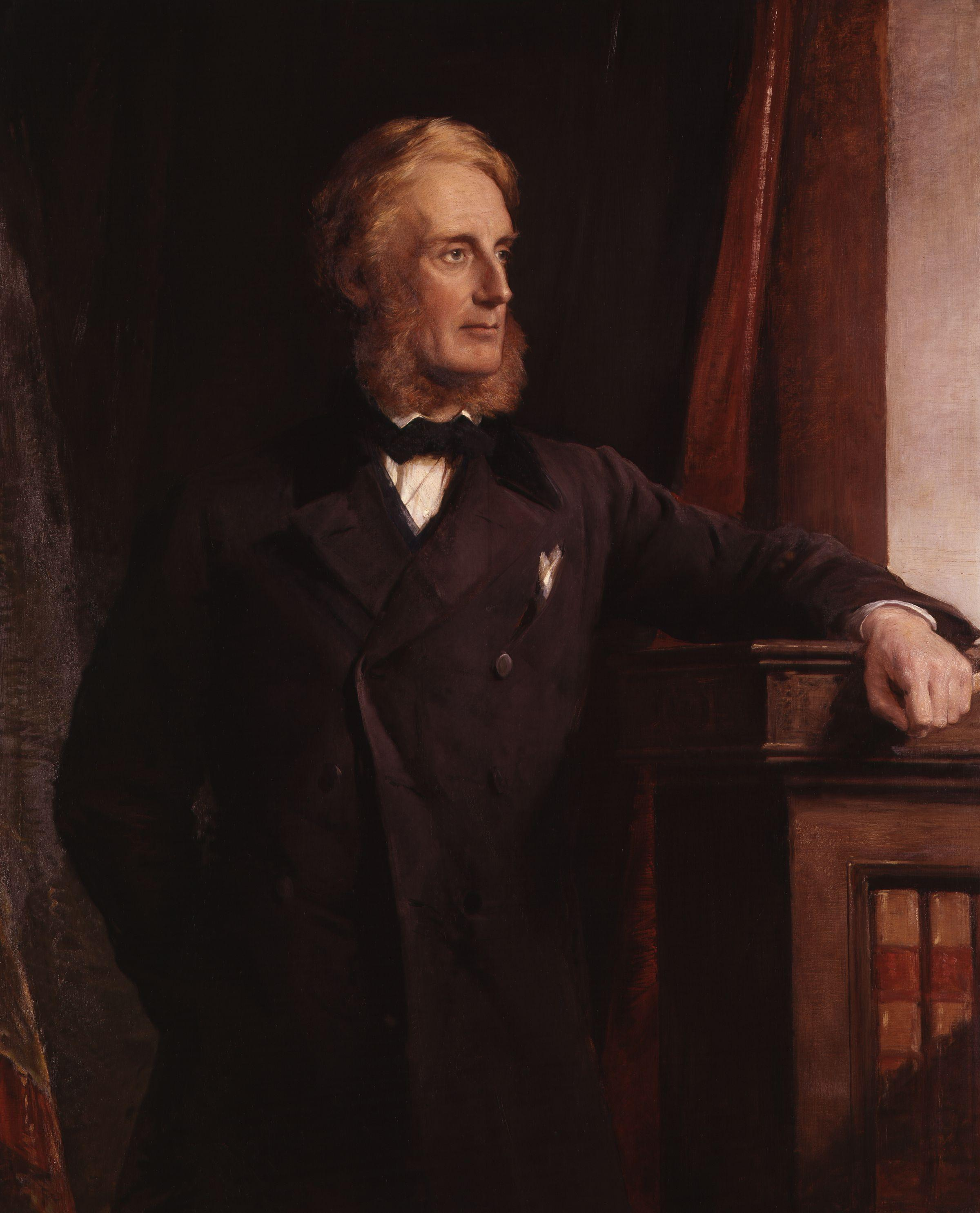
Portrait of Lord Cardwell by George Richmond, 1871.

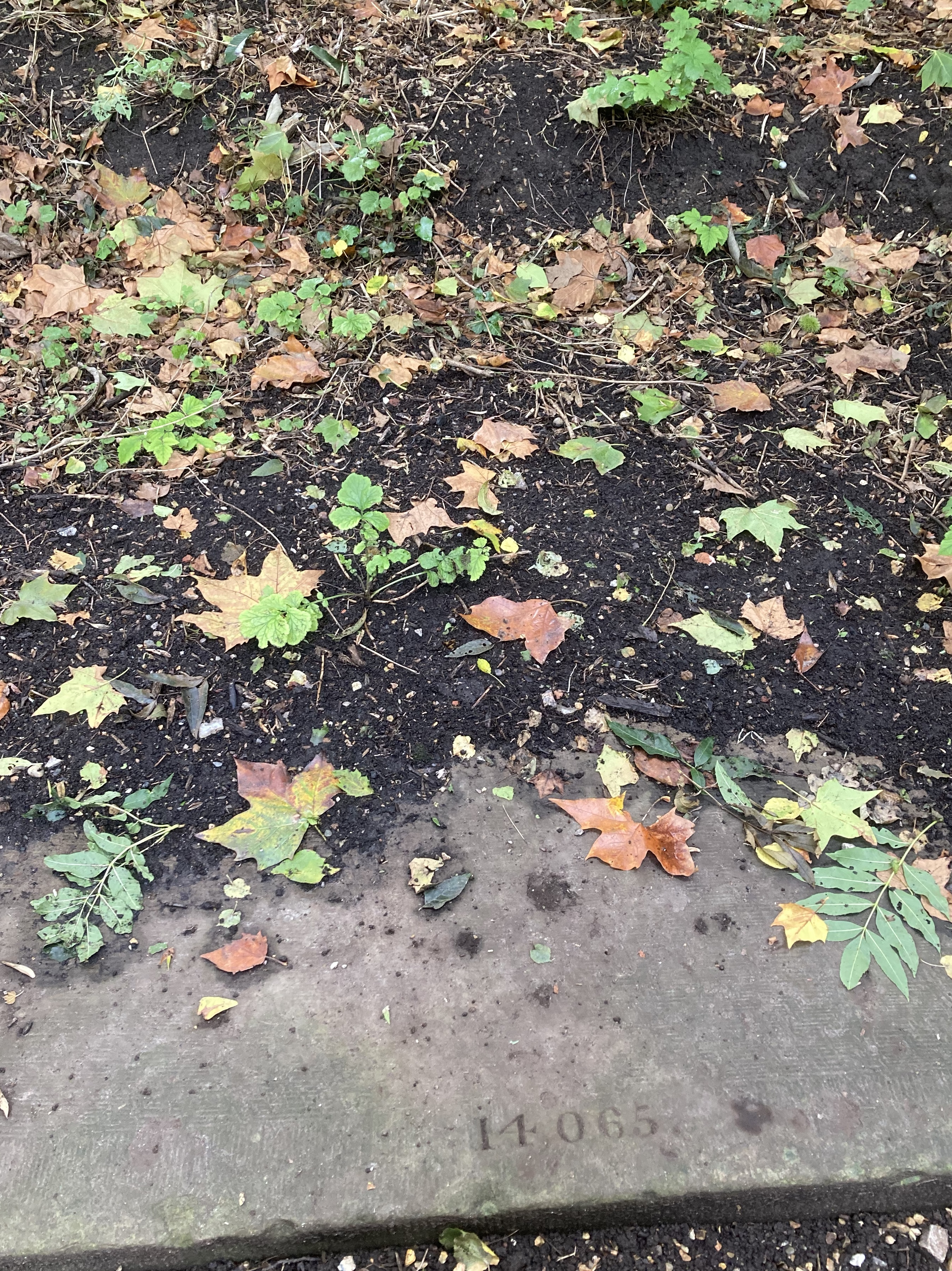
Grave of Edward Cardwell, 1st Viscount Cardwell, in Highgate Cemetery

Lord Cardwell married Annie, daughter of Charles Stuart Parker, in 1838. They had no children.

He died in Torquay, Devon, in February 1886, aged 72, and was buried on the western side of Highgate Cemetery (plot no.14065) in a large vault which now has no headstone and is largely covered by earth. Lady Cardwell died the following year, in February 1887.

The town of Cardwell in Queensland, Australia, was named after Lord Cardwell.

He owned 4,500 acres (1,800 ha).

== Arms ==
Coat of arms of Edward Cardwell, 1st Viscount Cardwell
Crest A man in armour holding in the dexter hand a war mace all Proper charged on the breast with a cross pattee Gules. Escutcheon Argent a chevron Sable in base a maiden's head erased Proper ducally crowned Or on a chief of the second two maidens' heads erased also Proper ducally crowned Or. Supporters On either side a man in armour holding in the exterior hand a battle-axe all Proper charged on the breast with a cross pattee Gules.

== Notes ==
Parliament of the United Kingdom
Preceded by Mathew Wilson	Member of Parliament for Clitheroe; 1842 – 1847	Succeeded by Mathew Wilson
Preceded by Sir Howard Douglas, Bt; Viscount Sandon	Member of Parliament for Liverpool; 1847 – 1852; With: Sir Thomas Birch, Bt	Succeeded by Charles Turner; William Forbes Mackenzie
Preceded by James Langston; William Wood	Member of Parliament for Oxford; 1853 – 1874; With: James Langston 1853–1857, 1857–1863; Charles Neate 1857, 1863–1868; William Harcourt 1868–1874	Succeeded by Alexander William Hall; William Harcourt
Political offices
Preceded by Sir George Clerk, Bt	Financial Secretary to the Treasury; 1845–1846	Succeeded by John Parker
Preceded by Joseph Warner Henley	President of the Board of Trade; 1852–1855	Succeeded by The Lord Stanley of Alderley
Preceded by Lord Naas	Chief Secretary for Ireland; 1859–1861	Succeeded by Sir Robert Peel, Bt
Preceded by Sir George Grey, Bt	Chancellor of the Duchy of Lancaster; 1861–1864	Succeeded by The Earl of Clarendon
Preceded by The Duke of Newcastle	Secretary of State for the Colonies; 1864–1866	Succeeded by The Earl of Carnarvon
Preceded by Sir John Pakington, Bt	Secretary of State for War; 1868–1874	Succeeded by Gathorne Hardy
