= Samuel Plimsoll =

British politician and social reformer

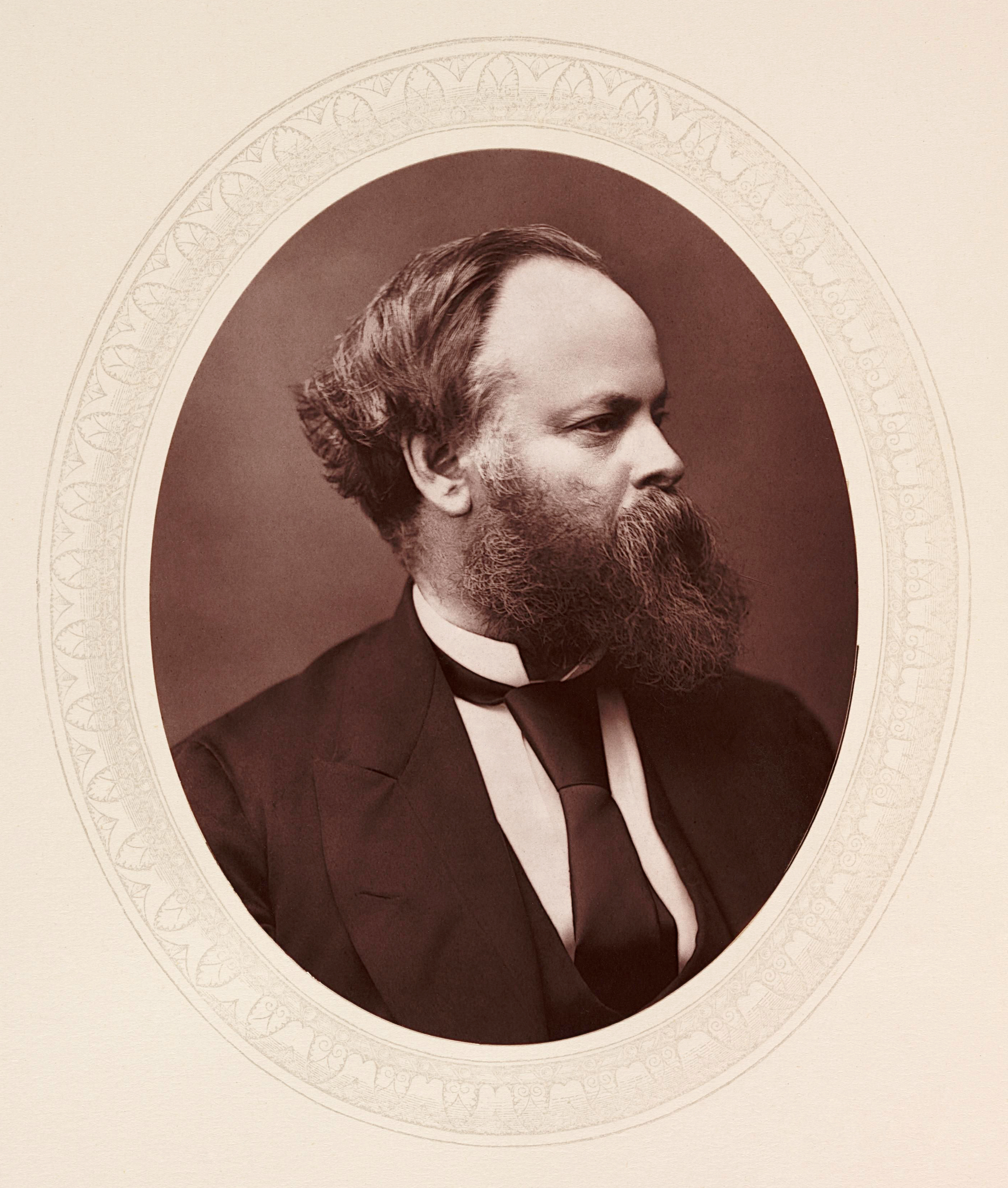
- Plimsoll in 1876, photographed by Lock & Whitfield
- Born: 10 February 1824; Bristol, England
- Died: 3 June 1898 (aged 74)
- Occupations: MP; social reformer
- Known for: Plimsoll line

Samuel Plimsoll (10 February 1824 – 3 June 1898) was a British politician and social reformer, now best remembered for having devised the Plimsoll line (a line on a ship's hull indicating the maximum safe draught, and therefore the minimum freeboard for the vessel in various operating conditions). Its subsequent introduction in regulation resulted in a reduction of ship sinkings and a corresponding significant improvement in seafarer safety from the late 19th century onwards.

== Early life ==
Samuel Plimsoll was born in Bristol in 1824. His Civil Servant father's promotions took him to Penrith in 1829 and to Regent Street, Sheffield in 1839. Leaving school at an early age, he became a clerk at Rawson's Brewery in the town. The managing partner there was Thomas Birks, who was also an Alderman on the town council. In 1849 he was elected as Mayor, and utilised Samuel as an assistant. One of his roles there was to coordinate the borough's many contributions to the 1851 Great Exhibition held at the Crystal Palace in London.

Seeking further opportunities, in 1853, he attempted to become a coal merchant in London. He failed and was reduced to destitution. He himself told how for a time he lived in a common lodging for seven shillings and two pence a week.

Through this experience, he learnt to sympathise with the struggles of the poor, and when his good fortune returned, he resolved to devote his time to improving their condition.

His efforts were directed especially against what were known as "coffin ships": unseaworthy and overloaded vessels, often heavily insured, in which unscrupulous owners risked the lives of their crews.

== Political career ==
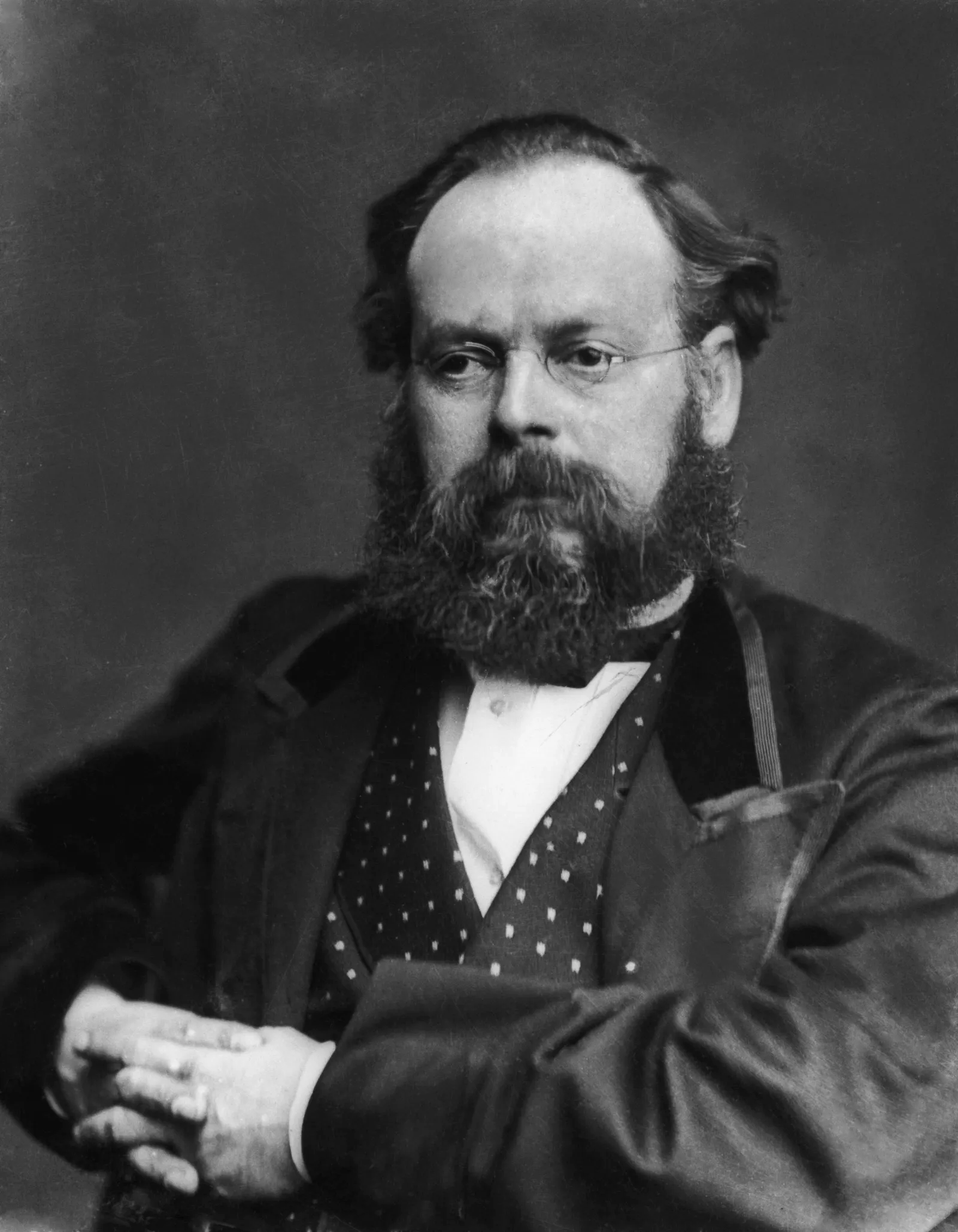
Plimsoll, by 1874

In 1867, Plimsoll was elected as the Liberal Member of Parliament for Derby, and endeavoured in vain to pass a bill dealing with the subject of a safe load line on ships. The main problem was the number of powerful ship-owning MPs in Parliament.

In 1873, he published a book entitled Our Seamen. It became well known throughout the country discussing the dangers of 'coffin ships' (ships that were highly insured in case of sinking, with minimum consideration given to seafarer safety). These ships were said to be overinsured and overloaded as a result. Accordingly, on Plimsoll's motion in 1873, a Royal Commission was appointed, and in 1875 a government bill was introduced, which Plimsoll, though regarding it as inadequate, resolved to accept. He continued to campaign for the safe loading of ships despite continued industrial opposition.

On 22 July, the Prime Minister, Benjamin Disraeli, announced that the bill would be dropped. Plimsoll lost his self-control, applied the term "villains" to members of the House, and shook his fist in the Speaker's face.

Disraeli moved that he be reprimanded, but on the suggestion of Lord Hartington agreed to adjourn the matter for a week to allow Plimsoll time for thought.

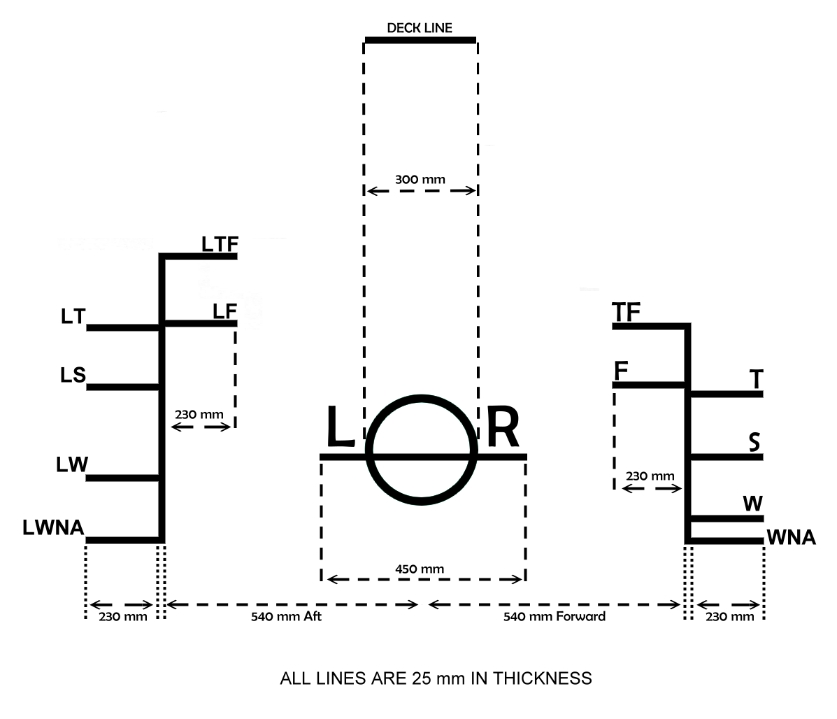
Load Line Mark and Lines and Timber Load Line Mark and Lines for power driven merchant vessels

Eventually Plimsoll made an apology. Many people, however, shared his view that the bill had been stifled by the pressure of the shipowners, and popular feeling forced the government to pass a bill in 1876 was amended into the Merchant Shipping Act.

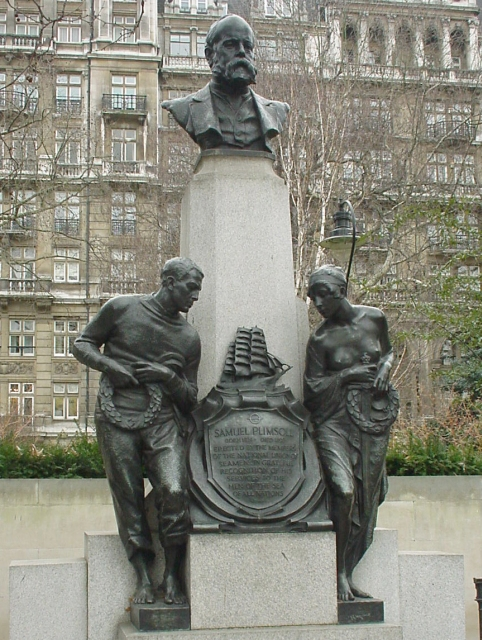
Memorial to Samuel Plimsoll on Victoria Embankment, London

This gave stringent powers of inspection to the Board of Trade, and the mark that indicates the safe limit to which a ship may be loaded became generally known as Plimsoll's mark or line. The improvements in safety resulted in fewer ship sinkings and seafarer deaths, with Plimsoll's reforms credited as "saving the lives of countless seaman." Plimsoll's reforms would go on to have a significant international effect in the 20th century, eventually resulting in the 1930 International Convention on Load Lines.

Plimsoll was re-elected for Derby at the UK general election of 1880 by a great majority but gave up his seat to William Vernon Harcourt, believing that the latter, as Home Secretary, could advance sailors' interests more effectively than any private member.

Offered a seat by 30 constituencies, Plimsoll was an unsuccessful candidate in Sheffield Central in 1885. He did not re-enter the house, and later became estranged from the Liberal leaders by what he regarded as their breach of faith in neglecting the question of shipping reform.

He was for some years the honorary president of the National Sailors' and Firemen's Union, and drew attention to the horrors of the cattle-ships, where animals were transported under appalling and over-crowded conditions.

== Later life ==
Later, he visited the United States to try to secure the adoption of a less bitter tone towards England in the historical textbooks used in American schools. He died in Folkestone on 3 June 1898, and is buried in St Martin's churchyard, Cheriton, Kent.

== Family ==
Plimsoll married his first wife, Eliza Ann, daughter of Hugh Railton of Chapeltown, north of Sheffield, in 1858. In the 1871 Census, they were enumerated in Hastings where Eliza Ann is recorded as being blind in her right eye and deaf in her left ear. She died in Australia in 1882. Their only daughter died shortly after her birth of 'imperfect respiration'. He married his second wife, Harriet Frankish, daughter of Mr. Joseph Armitage Wade, J.P., of Hull and Hornsea, in 1885. By this marriage there were six children, of whom a son, Samuel Richard Cobden Plimsoll, and two daughters survived him.

== Legacy ==
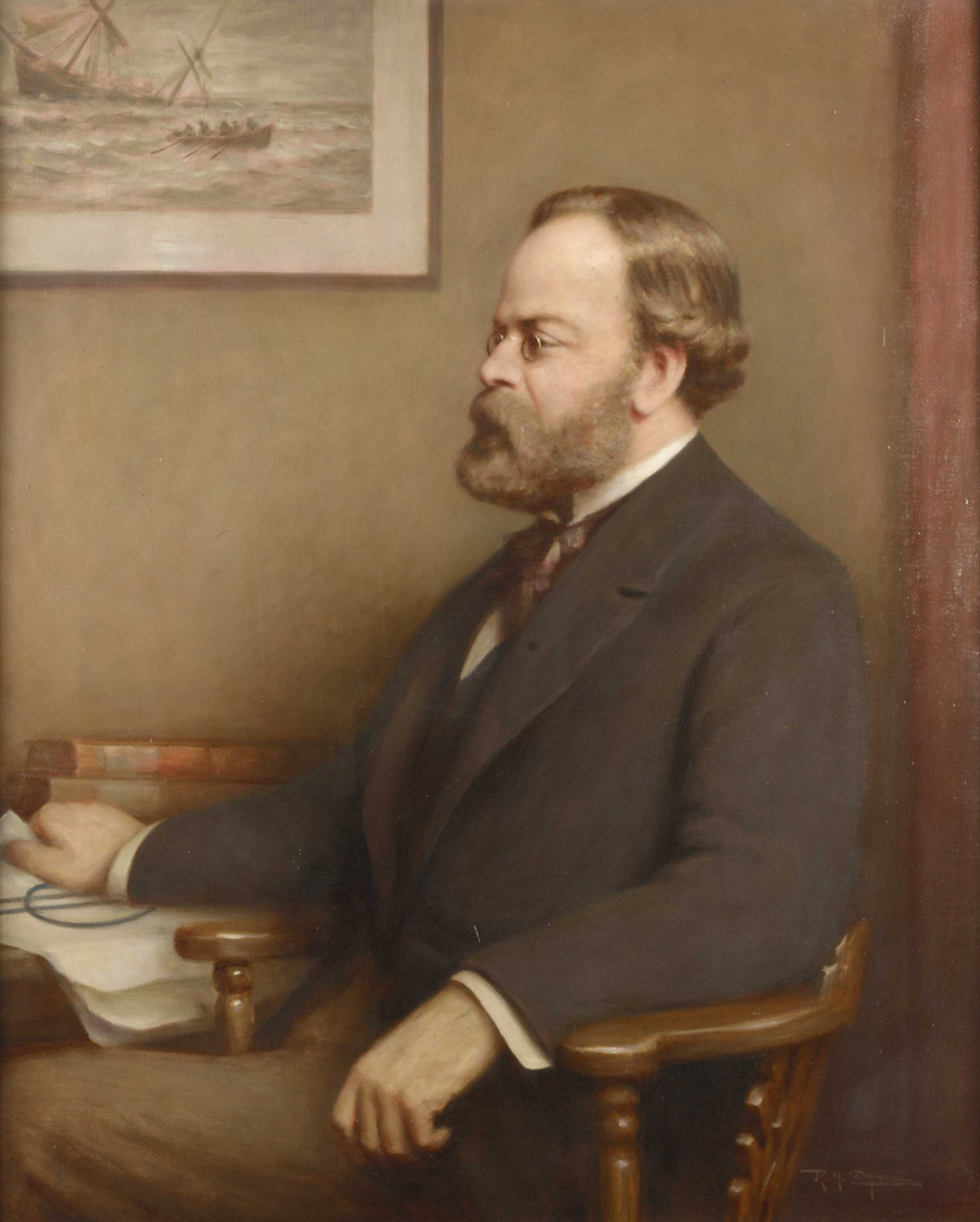
Posthumous portrait of Plimsoll, executed by Reginald Henry Campbell in the late 19th century

In 1873, the Samuel Plimsoll, an iron hulled full-rigged merchant sailing ship, used as a Colonial Clipper, was launched at the shipyard of Walter Hood & Co. in Aberdeen, Scotland for the Aberdeen White Star Line (G. Thompson & Co.). She was assigned the official British Reg. No. 65097 and the signal MKDH. In 1899, she caught fire in the River Thames and had to be scuttled, but she was refloated and repaired in 1900. In 1902, she was severely dismasted and damaged en voyage to Port Chalmers, New Zealand. Towed to Sydney and subsequently to Fremantle, she was reduced to hulk status the following year.

In the 1920s, Plimsoll shoes were named for their similarity in appearance to the Plimsoll line on boats.

In Whitehall Garden, a Victoria Embankment garden, there is a monument to Samuel Plimsoll in front of the railings.

A monument bust of Plimsoll is located in his native Bristol, on the banks of Bristol Harbour in the Canons Marsh area.

British writer Nicolette Jones published The Plimsoll Sensation, a highly acclaimed biography – getting the idea for it from living in 1995 in Plimsoll Road in Finsbury Park, north London, but knowing hardly anything about whom it was named after. In 2024, on the 200th anniversary of Samuel Plimsoll's birthday, the book was updated with a new introduction to honour his legacy in improvements to ship safety.

Samuel Plimsoll appears in the third series of the BBC historical television drama The Onedin Line, portrayed by actor David Garfield.

Samuel Plimsoll's life and achievement is celebrated in a song written and sung by Bristol sea shanty group The Severn Whalers around festivals in and around the South West.

Parliament of the United Kingdom
| Preceded by William Thomas Cox; Michael Thomas Bass | Member of Parliament for Derby; 1868 – 1880; With: Michael Thomas Bass | Succeeded by Sir William Vernon Harcourt; Michael Thomas Bass |
