= Load line (watercraft) =

Legal limit to which a ship may be loaded

The load line, also known as Plimsoll line, indicates the legal limit to which a ship may be loaded for specific water types and temperatures in order to safely maintain buoyancy, particularly with regard to the hazard of waves. The load line is a waterline that corresponds to the maximum draft of the ship, thus yet another name, load waterline. Varying water temperatures will affect a ship's draft, because warm water is less dense than cold water, providing less buoyancy. In the same way, fresh water is less dense than salinated or seawater, with a similar lessening effect upon buoyancy. The rules for international load lines are defined by the International Convention on Load Lines from 1966. For inland water transport regional, national or local rules apply.

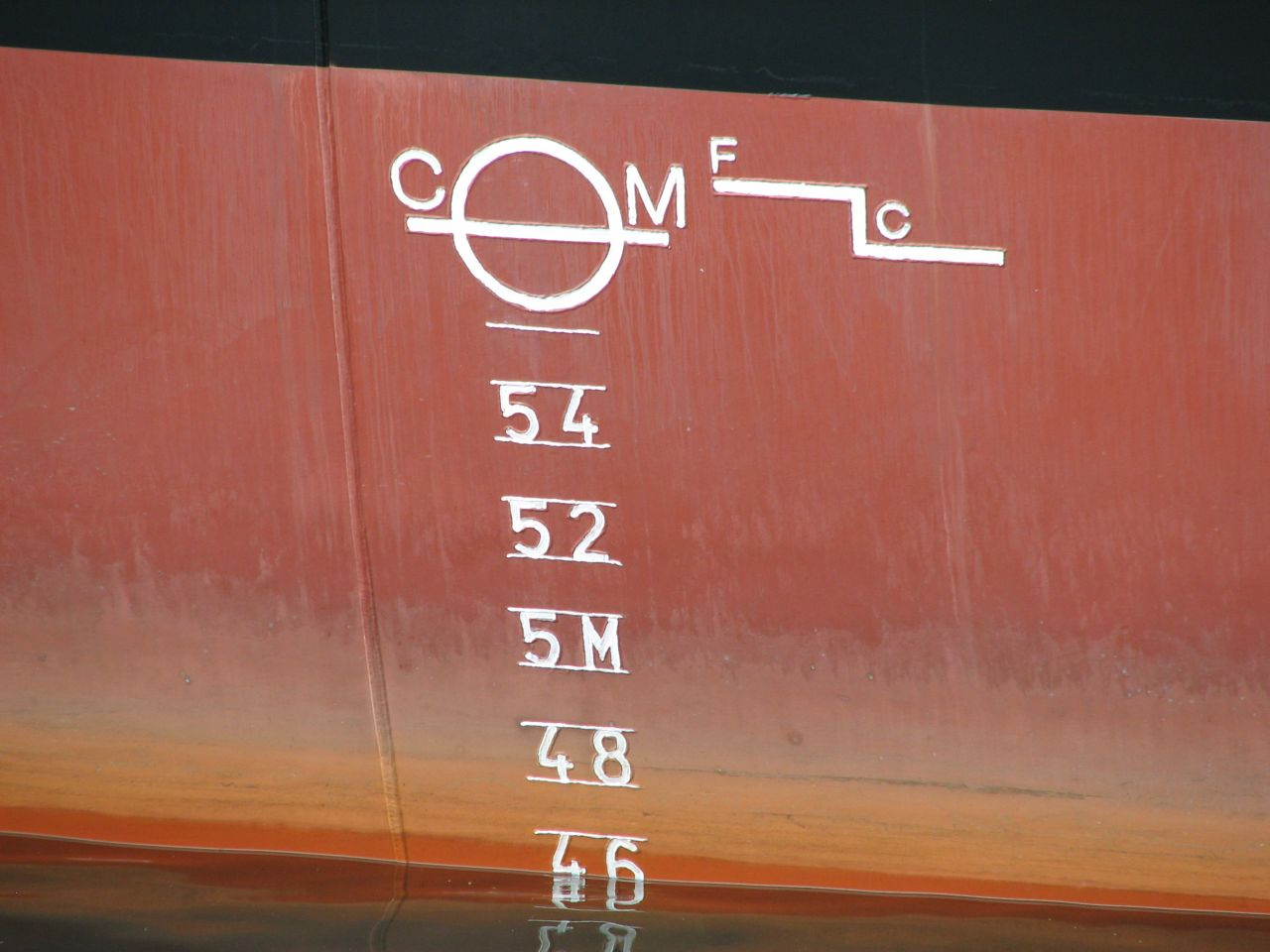
Load line mark and additional load lines on the hull of a ship

Load lines are indicated by special markings on the hull. The marking for the main load line, the summer load line, is called load line mark or Plimsoll line (positioned amidships), the marks for other conditions are named after the condition suffixed with "load line" (e.g. winter load line).

== Purpose ==
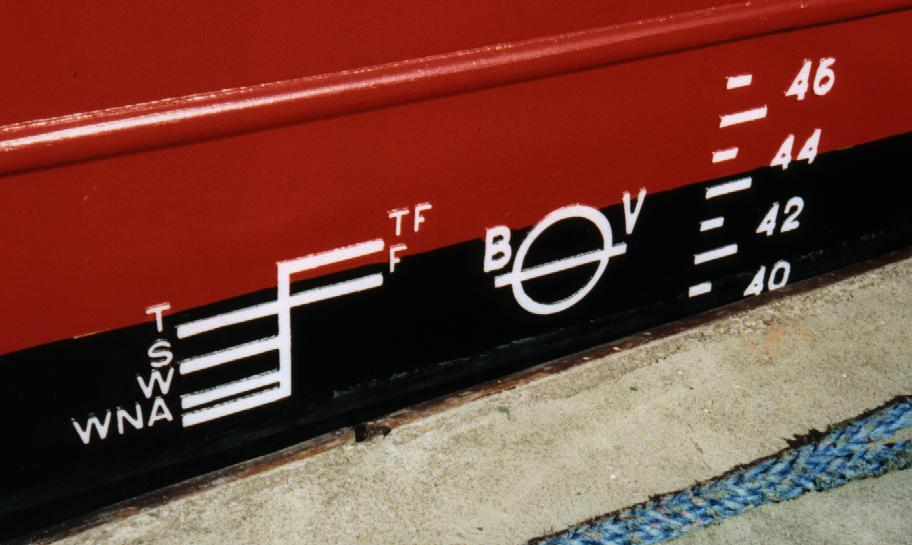
Load line markings on a cereal carrier, certified by Bureau Veritas.

The purpose of a load line is to ensure that a ship has sufficient freeboard (the height from the waterline to the main deck) and thus sufficient reserve buoyancy. The freeboard of commercial vessels is measured between the lowest point of the uppermost continuous deck at side and the waterline and this must not be less than the freeboard marked on the load line certificate issued to that ship. All commercial ships, other than in exceptional circumstances, have a load line symbol painted amidships on each side of the ship. This symbol is also permanently marked, so that if the paint wears off it remains visible. The load line makes it easy for anyone to determine if a ship has been overloaded. The exact location of the load line is calculated and verified by a classification society and that society issues the relevant certificates. This marking was invented in 1876 by Samuel Plimsoll.

== History ==
=== Early history ===
In the Middle Ages, the Venetian Republic, the Republic of Genoa and the Hanseatic League required ships to show a load line. In the case of Venice this was a cross marked on the side of the ship, and of Genoa three horizontal lines.

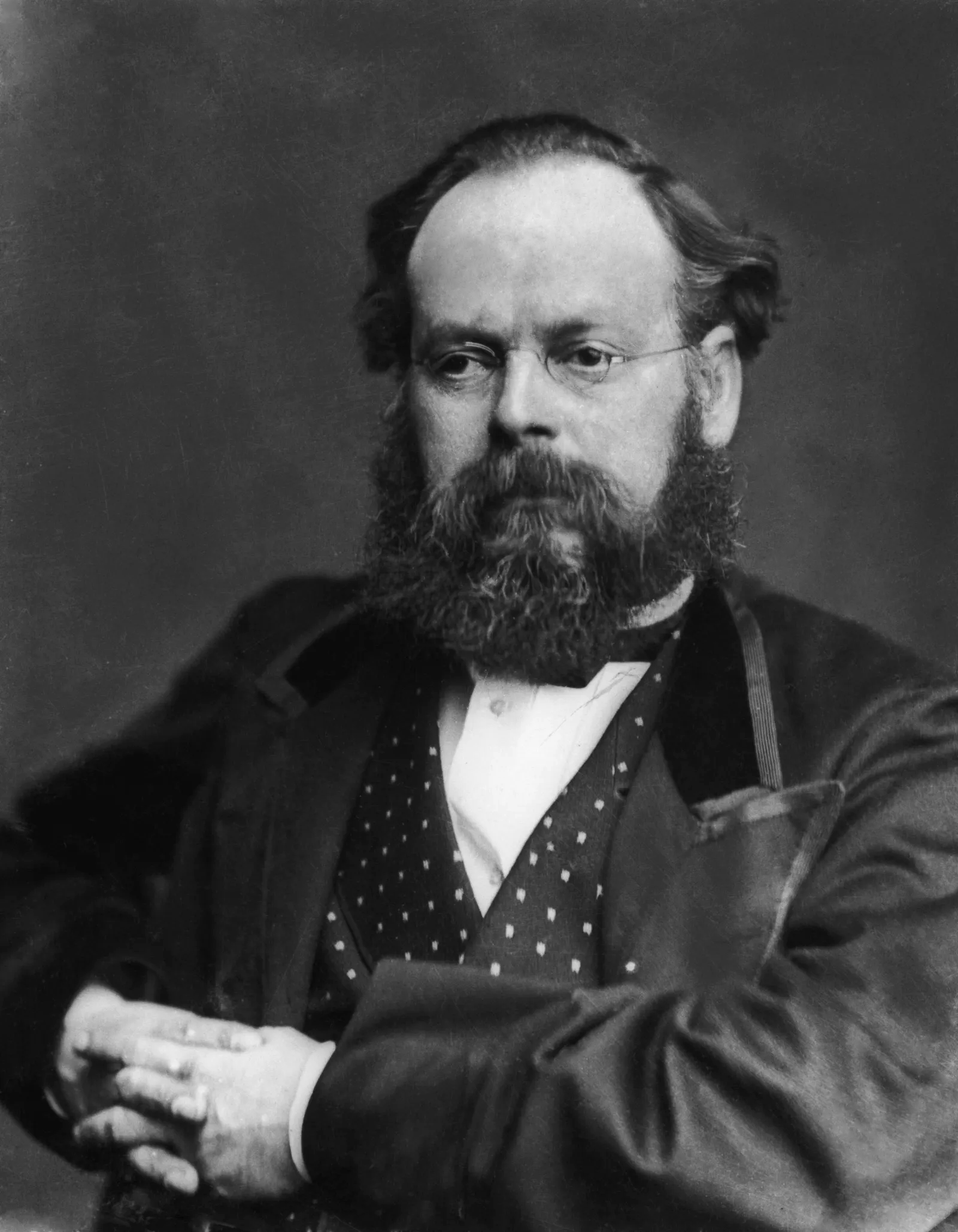
Samuel Plimsoll

=== Reform and standardisation ===
The first 19th-century loading recommendations were introduced by Lloyd's Register in 1835, following discussions among shipowners, shippers and underwriters. Lloyd's recommended freeboards as a function of the depth of the hold (three inches per foot of depth, 250 mm/m). These recommendations, used extensively until 1880, became known as "Lloyd's Rule".

The creators of the 'rule' did not enjoy the prominence it gained, knowing it was an oversimplification that did not take into account depth, sheer, and other form factors relating to the size and shape of the hull.

In 1869, after increased loss of ships due to overloading, a bill was introduced to Parliament that was amended to include the provision that the draught of water when a vessel was leaving port should be recorded. The bill expired, failing to be passed before the end of the parliamentary session.

The law was re-committed the following year and passed as the Merchant Shipping Act 1871, requiring a scale in feet on the stem and stern of a ship in six-inch high letters to coincide with the draught line.

In 1873, Samuel Plimsoll took up the load line cause against strong opposition with his book Our Seamen. The Royal Commission on Unseaworthy Ships was established in 1872, resulting in a new law, the Merchant Shipping Act 1876 (39 & 40 Vict. c. 80) was passed making the load line mark compulsory for all ships over 80 GRT.

The Merchant Shipping Act 1876 described the load line for the first time in law.

[The ship] shall be permanently and conspicuously marked with lines of not less than twelve inches in length and one inch in breadth, painted longitudinally on each side amidships, or as near thereto as is practicable, and indicating the position of each deck which is above water [and a] mark upon each of her sides amidships, or as near thereto as is practicable, in white or yellow on a dark ground, or in black on a light ground, a circular disc twelve inches in diameter, with a horizontal line eighteen inches in length drawn through its centre. The centre of this disc shall indicate the maximum load-line in salt water to which the owner intends to load the ship for that voyage.

— Merchant Shipping Act 1876

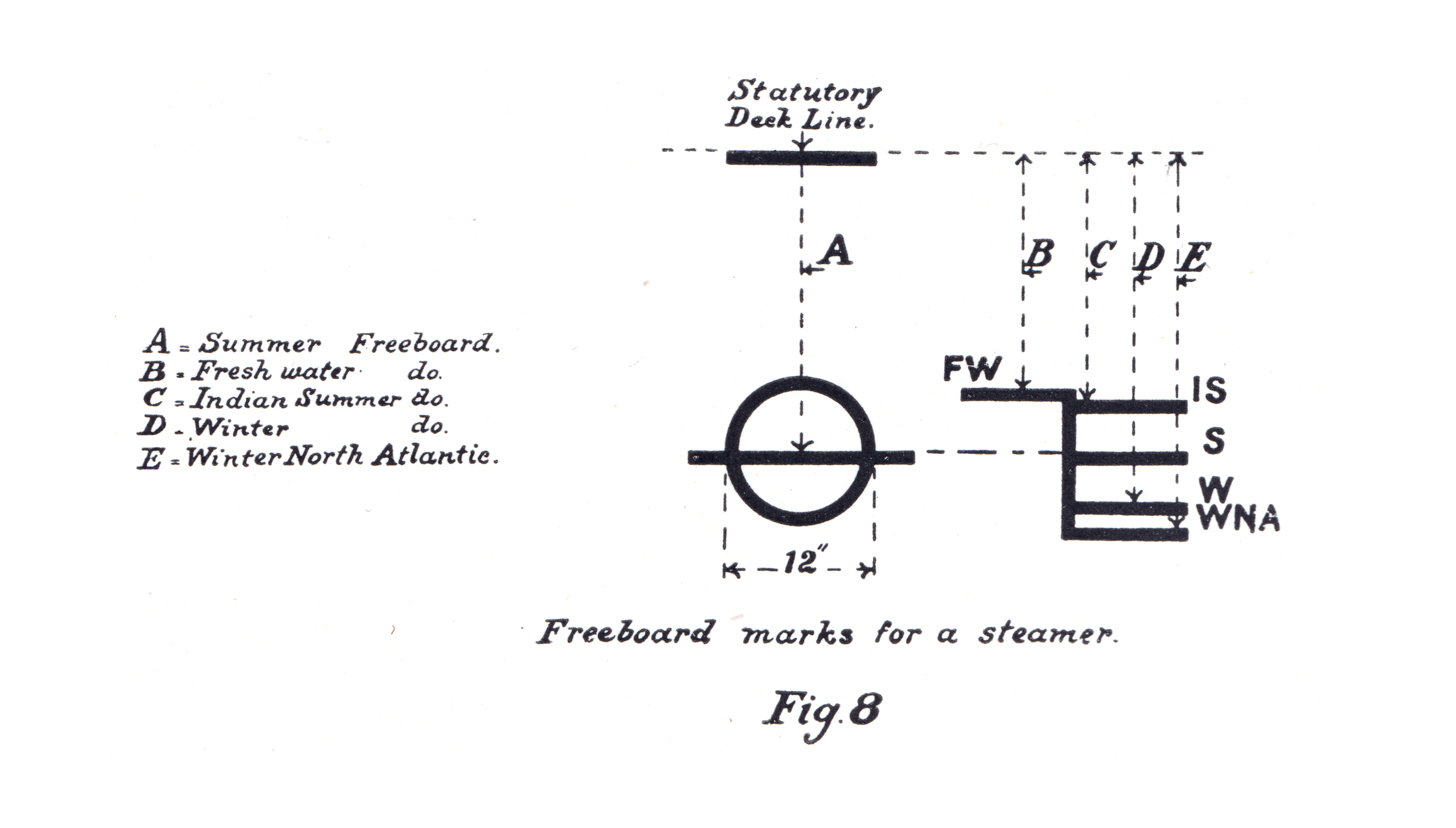
An early example of load lines from Practical Shipbuilding (1916)

The more controversial vertical positioning of the mark was fixed by the Merchant Shipping Act 1894, amending the previous law.

The centre of this disc shall be placed at such level as may be approved by the Board of Trade below the deck-line marked under this Act and specified in the certificate given there-, under, and shall indicate the maximum load-line in salt water to which it shall be lawful to load the ship.

— Merchant Shipping Act 1894

Lloyd's Register were continuing to improve their own freeboard calculations, and by 1882 had settled on Freeboard Tables that took more hull form factors into account. These were formally adopted by the Board of Trade in 1894 and referenced by the act to determine the position of the load line disc.

=== Wider adoption ===
In 1906, laws were passed requiring foreign ships visiting British ports to be marked with a load line. It was not until 1930 (the 1930 Load Line Convention) that there was international agreement for universal application of load line regulations.

In 1966, the International Convention on Load Lines was concluded in London, re-examining and amending the 1930 rules. The 1966 convention has since seen amendments in 1971, 1975, 1979, 1983, 1995 and 2003, none of which have entered into force.

== Standard load line marks ==
The original "Plimsoll mark" was a circle with a horizontal line through it to show the maximum draft of a ship. Additional marks have been added over the years, allowing for different water densities and expected sea conditions.

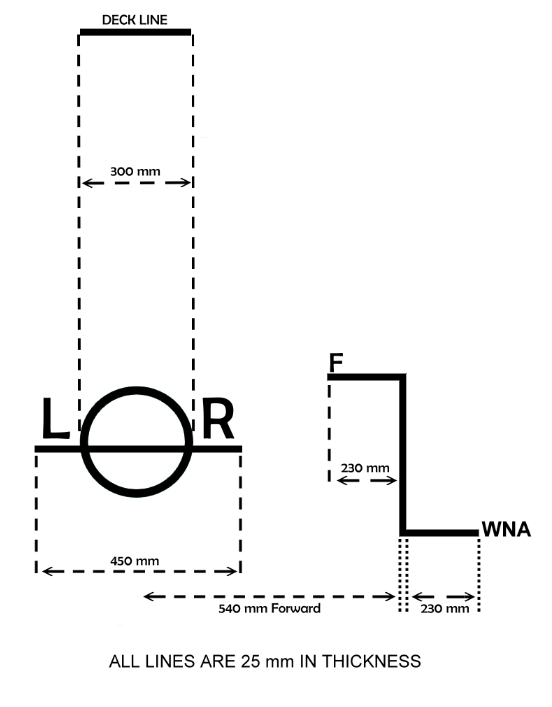
Lloyd's Register ("LR") load line mark and lines for commercial sailing vessels

Letters may also appear to the sides of the mark indicating the classification society that has surveyed the vessel's load line. The initials used include:

- AB for the American Bureau of Shipping,
- BV for Bureau Veritas,
- CM for Ships Classification Malaysia
- GL for Germanischer Lloyd
- IR for the Indian Register of Shipping,
- LR for Lloyd's Register,
- NK for Nippon Kaiji Kyokai,
- NV for Det Norske Veritas
- PR for Polish Register of Shipping
- RI for the Registro Italiano Navale and
- VL for DNV GL.

These letters are approximately 115 millimetres in height and 75 millimetres in width (4.5 by 3.0 in). The load line length is referred to during and following load line calculations.

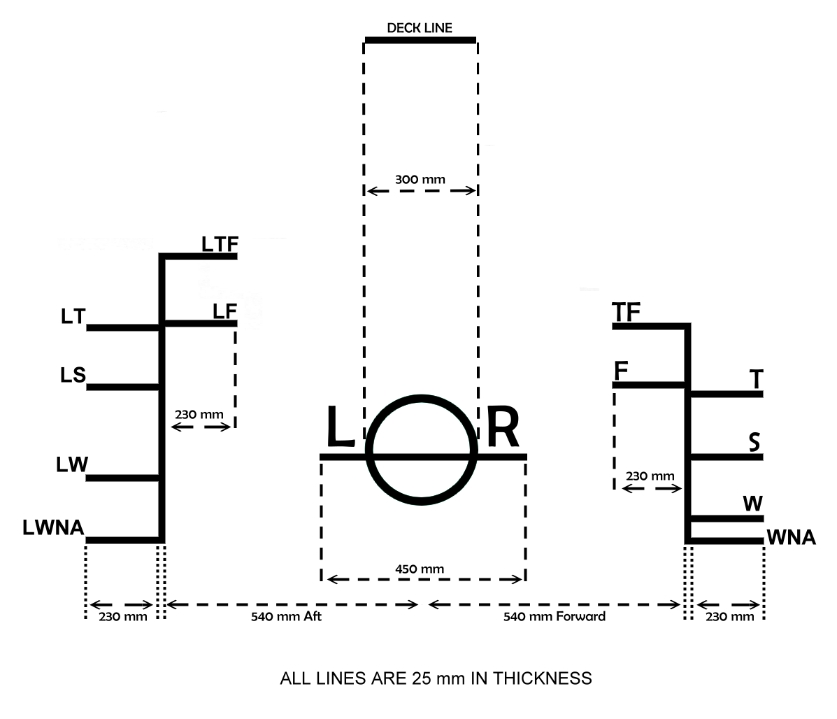
Lloyd's Register ("LR") load line mark and lines and timber load line mark and lines for power-driven merchant vessels

The letters on the load line marks have the following meanings:

- TF – tropical fresh water
- F – fresh water
- T – tropical seawater
- S – summer temperate seawater
- W – winter temperate seawater
- WNA – winter North Atlantic seawater

For the purposes of load line marks, freshwater is considered to have a density of 1,000 kg/m^{3} (62 lb/cu ft) and typical seawater 1,025 kg/m^{3} (64 lb/cu ft). Freshwater marks make allowance for the fact that the ship will float deeper in freshwater than saltwater. A ship loaded to her fresh water mark in fresh water will float at her summer mark once she has passed into seawater at the same displacement. Similarly, if loaded to her tropical freshwater mark she will float at her tropical seawater mark once she passes into seawater.

- TF – The position of the tropical fresh water load line relative to the tropical load line is found in the same way as the freshwater load line is to the summer load line.
- F – The fresh water load line is an amount equal to Δ/4T millimetres above the summer load line where Δ is the displacement in tonnes at the summer load draft and T is the tonnes per centimetre immersion at that draft. In any case where Δ cannot be ascertained, the freshwater load line is at the same level as the tropical load line.
- T – The tropical seawater load line is one forty-eighth of the summer load draft above the summer load line.
- S – The summer seawater load line (also named designwaterline (DWL)) is the primary load line and it is from this mark that all other marks are derived. The position of the summer load line is calculated from the load line rules and depends on many factors such as length of ship, type of ship, type and number of superstructures, amount of sheer, and bow height. The horizontal line through the circle of the Plimsoll mark is at the same level as the summer load line.
- W – The winter seawater load line is one forty-eighth of the summer load draft below the summer load line.
- WNA – The winter North Atlantic seawater load line is used by vessels not exceeding 100 m (330 ft) in length when in certain areas of the North Atlantic Ocean during the winter period. When assigned it is 50 mm (2 in) below the winter mark.

=== Timber load line marks ===
Certain vessels are assigned timber freeboards, but before these can be assigned, certain additional conditions have to be met. One of these conditions is that the vessel must have a forecastle of at least 0.07 the length of the vessel and of not less than standard height, which is 1.8 m (5 ft 11 in) for a vessel 75 m (246 ft) or less in length and 2.3 m (7 ft 7 in) for a vessel 125 m (410 ft) or more in length with intermediate heights for intermediate lengths. A poop or raised quarterdeck is also required if the length is less than 100 m (330 ft). The letter L prefixes the load line marks to indicate a timber load line. Except for the timber winter North Atlantic freeboard, the other freeboards are less than the standard freeboards. This allows these ships to carry additional timber as deck cargo, but with the facility to jettison this cargo.

The letters on the timber load line marks have the following meanings:

- LTF – timber tropical fresh water
- LF – timber fresh water
- LT – timber tropical seawater
- LS – timber summer seawater
- LW – timber winter seawater
- LWNA – timber winter North Atlantic

The summer timber load line is arrived at from the appropriate tables in the load line rules.

The winter timber load line is one thirty-sixth of the summer timber load draft below the summer timber load line.

The tropical timber load line is one forty-eighth of the summer timber load draft above the summer timber load line.

The timber fresh water and the tropical timber fresh water load lines are calculated in a similar way to the freshwater and tropical freshwater load lines, except that the displacement used in the formula is that of the vessel at her summer timber load draft. If this cannot be ascertained, then these marks will be one forty-eighth of the timber summer draft above the timber summer and timber tropical marks, respectively.

The timber winter North Atlantic load line is at the same level as the winter North Atlantic load line.

== Subdivision load line marks ==
Passenger ships having spaces which are adapted for the accommodation of passengers and the carriage of cargo alternatively may have one or more additional load line marks corresponding to the subdivision drafts approved for the alternative conditions. These marks show P1 for the principal passenger condition, and P2, P3, etc., for the alternative conditions; however, in no case is any subdivision load line mark placed above the deepest load line in saltwater.

Subdivision load line marks

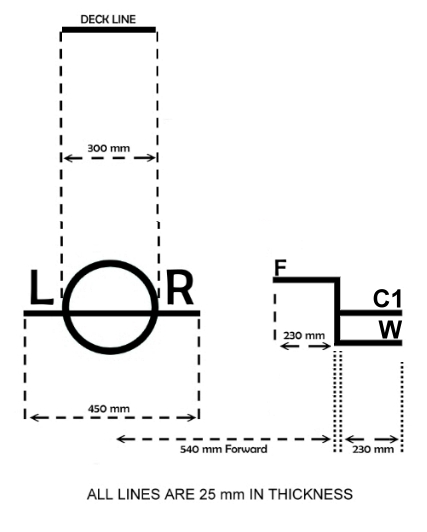
Passenger vessel with no allowed subdivision load line

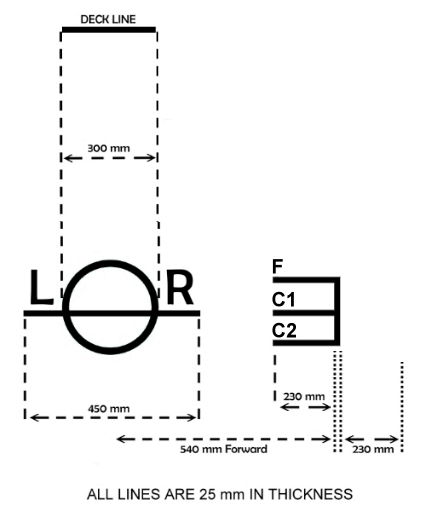
Passenger vessel with one allowed subdivision load line

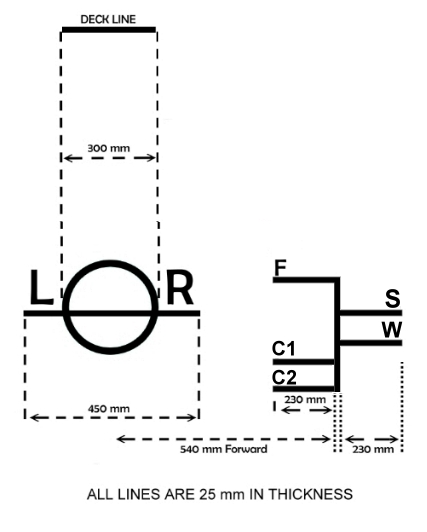
Passenger vessel with two allowed subdivision load lines

== See also ==
- Ballast tank
- Coffin ship (insurance)
- Plimsoll shoe
- Sailing ballast
- SS London – sank in 1866 and stimulated Parliament to introduce the Plimsoll line
- Stability conditions (watercraft)
- The Onedin Line (episode "Danger Level")

== Sources ==
- baron de Kerchove, René (1961). "Load Waterline". International Maritime Dictionary: An Encyclopedic Dictionary of Useful Maritime Terms and Phrases, Together with Equivalents in French and German (2 ed.). Van Nostrand Reinhold. pp. 464–465. ISBN 978-0-442-02062-0. OCLC 1039382382.
