= Plimsoll (shoe) =

Type of canvas shoe

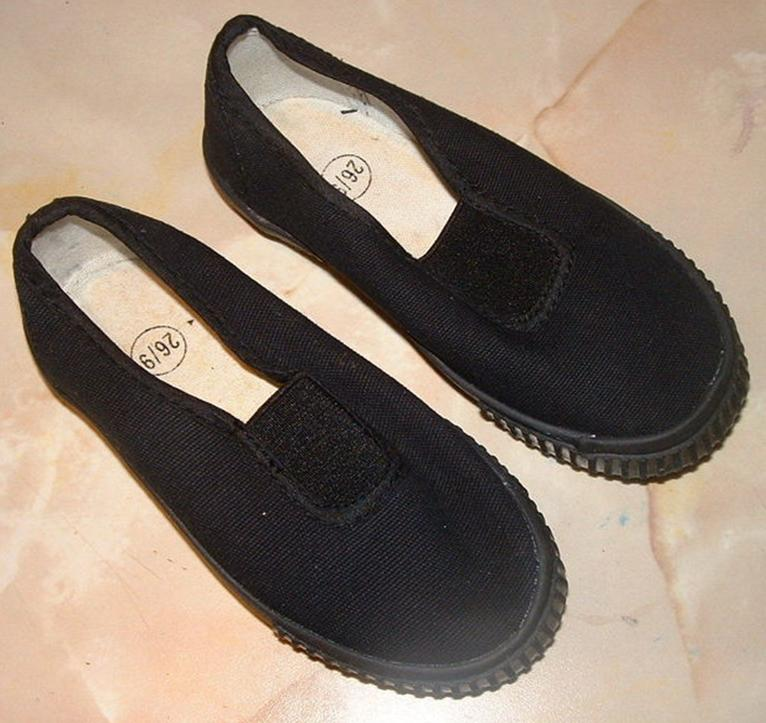
Plimsolls with elastic instead of laces

A plimsoll, also spelled plimsole, or pump (also known as a gym shoe or a sandshoe), is a light sports shoe with a canvas upper and flat rubber sole.

== History ==
=== United Kingdom ===
The shoe originated in the United Kingdom, then called a "sand shoe", acquiring the nickname "plimsoll" in the 1870s. This name arose, according to Nicholette Jones's book The Plimsoll Sensation, because the coloured horizontal band joining the upper to the sole resembled the Plimsoll line on a ship's hull, or because, just like the line on a ship, if water got above the line of the rubber sole, the wearer would get wet.

A pair of blue plimsolls

In the UK, plimsolls are commonly worn for school indoor physical education. Regional terms are common: In Northern Ireland and Scotland, they may be known as "gutties" (from gutta-percha i.e., India rubber). The term "sannies" (from "sand shoe") is used in Scotland and features in versions of the song Cod Liver Oil and the Orange Juice. In London, the home counties, much of the West Midlands, the West Riding of Yorkshire, and northwest of England, they are known as "pumps". In parts of the West Country and Wales, they are known as "daps".

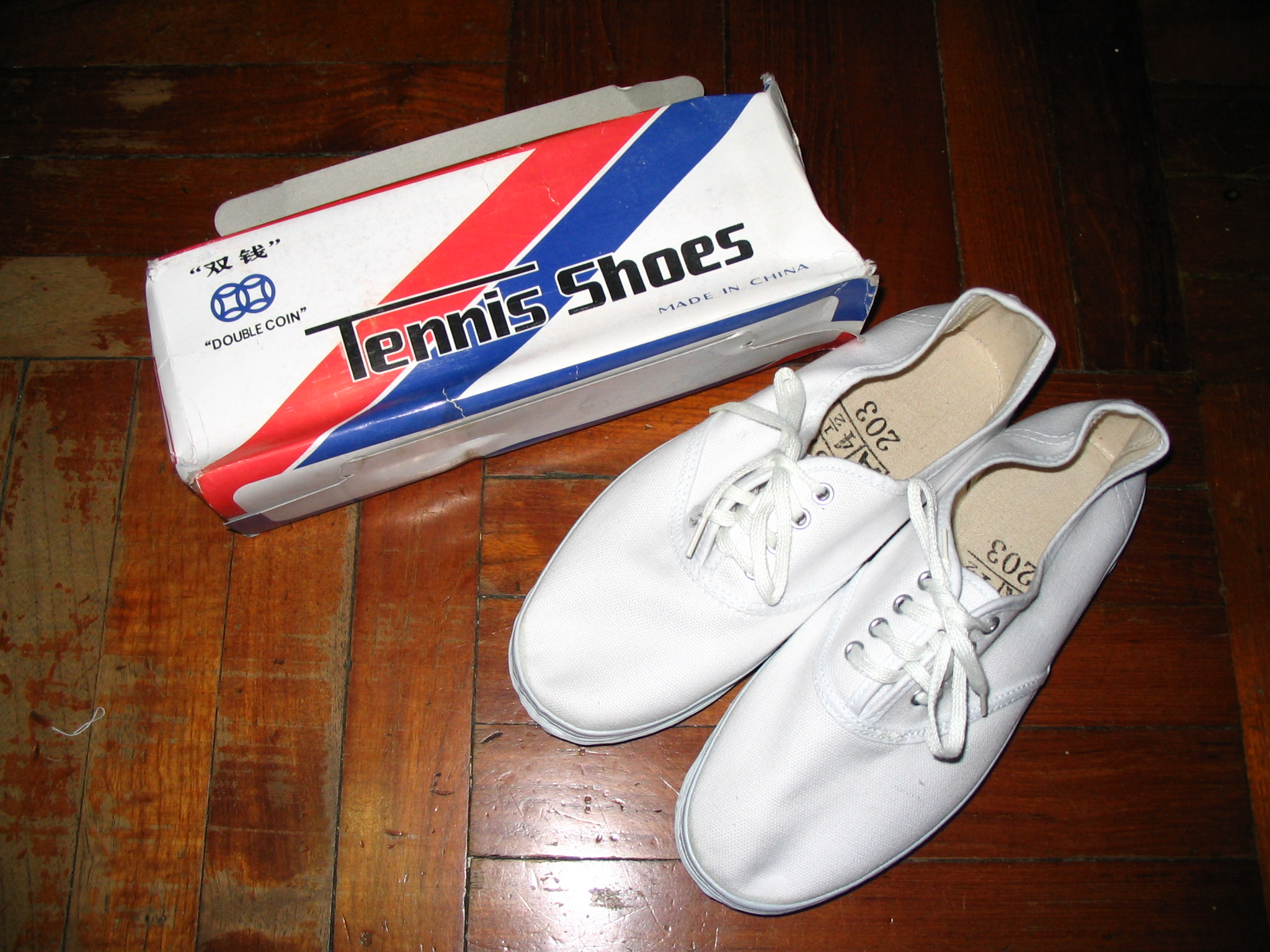
A pair of white plimsolls labelled as "tennis shoes"

=== Hong Kong ===
In Hong Kong, white plimsolls functioned as cheap athletic shoes from the 1970s to the 1990s. Due to naming taboo (in Cantonese, 鞋 (shoes), sounds identical to 骸 (corpse)) and their colour and shape resembling noodlefish, they were commonly known as baahk faahn yú(白飯魚). A pair typically cost around $15 HKD (around US$2) and was the designated gym class shoe in school. However, due to the canvas being thin and thus unable to protect the ankles and lacking support for the foot arch, plimsolls were eventually phased out and replaced by more sturdy trainers.

== See also ==
- Sneakers
- List of shoe styles
