= Katherine Raleigh =

English classicist, suffragist and tax resister (1852–1937)

- Born: 9 April 1852; Rotherham, West Riding of Yorkshire, England
- Died: 11 January 1937 (aged 84); North Kensington, London, England
- Burial place: Abney Park Cemetery, Highbury, London, England
- Education: Newnham College, Cambridge
- Occupations: classics scholar, suffragist and tax resister
- Employer: Hellenic Society
- Organization(s): Women's Freedom League; National Union of Women's Suffrage Societies; Women's Tax Resistance League; The Folklore Society

Katherine Ann Raleigh (9 May 1852 – 11 January 1937) was an English classics scholar, suffragist and tax resister. She was secretary of the Uxbridge and District Women's Freedom League (WFL) branch and a member of the National Union of Women's Suffrage Societies (NUWSS) and Women’s Tax Resistance League (WTRL).

== Education ==
Raleigh was born in 1852 in Rotherham, Yorkshire, England. She was the daughter of Reverend Alexander Raleigh, a Congregationalist minister, and Mary (née Gifford). Her brother was Walter Alexander Raleigh and Lord Gifford was an uncle. She attended classes in political economy, French, archaeology and Egyptology at University College London. She then studied classics at Newnham College, Cambridge, where she founded the Raleigh Musical Society.

== Career ==
After graduating from Newnham in 1886, Raleigh worked as a Greek scholar, expert on classical history and librarian for the Hellenic Society. In 1905, she attended the International Classical Archaeological Congress in Athens.

Raleigh translated The Gods of Olympos, or Mythology of the Greeks and Romans by August Heinrich Petiscus (1780–1846); this was published in 1892 with a preface by Jane Ellen Harrison. Raleigh gave lectures at the British Museum, such as on "Demonstrations on the Mausoleum of Helicarnassus" and "The Parthenon", and on 10 November 1913 she gave a lecture at Caxton Hall on "the Worship of Athene".

Raleigh was also a member of The Folklore Society, joining in 1906.

== Suffrage activism ==
Raleigh was a member of the National Union of Women's Suffrage Societies (NUWSS) and lived next door to Uxbridge's NUWSS headquarters. She also organised in Amersham, Aylesbury and Great Missenden in Buckinghamshire, during a stay in Wendover. She wrote pamphlets in support of women's suffrage.

In 1909, Raleigh stood as the first female candidate for Uxbridge's Urban District Council; she came last.

In 1911, Votes for Women reported that Raleigh had organised a meeting on 16 March at Uxbridge Town Hallin London, chaired by Evelina Haverfield and with speeches by Anne Cobden-Sanderson and Margaret Kineton Parkes. Raleigh also participated in the 1911 suffragette census boycott.

Raleigh was a member of the Women’s Tax Resistance League. She refused to pay house duty and in September 1911, some of her belongings were sold at an auction at Chequers Hotel in Uxbridge, to cover her unpaid taxes, with fellow suffragists purchasing them.

In August 1915 when in Stratford-upon-Avon, Raleigh refused to complete a form required under the National Registration Act 1915 and was prosecuted. She was fined £3 and £1 1s in solicitors fees.

== Death ==
Raleigh died in Kensington on 11 January 1937, aged 84. She was buried at Abney Park Cemetery in Highbury, London.
