= Man Was Made to Mourn =

1784 poem by Robert Burns

- by Robert Burns
- Genre: Dirge
- Publication date: 1784
- Lines: 88 (11 stanzas)
- Metre: Common metre

Full text
- The Poetical Works of Robert Burns/Man was made to mourn at Wikisource

"Man Was Made to Mourn: A Dirge" is a dirge of eleven stanzas by the Scots poet Robert Burns, first published in 1784 and included in the first edition of Poems, Chiefly in the Scottish Dialect in 1786. The poem is one of Burns's many early works that criticize class inequalities. It is known for its line protesting "Man's inhumanity to man", which has been widely quoted since its publication.

== Composition ==
The origin of this poem is alluded to by Burns in one of his letters to Frances Dunlop: "I had an old grand-uncle with whom my mother lived in her girlish years: the good old man was long blind ere he died, during which time his highest enjoyment was to sit and cry, while my mother would sing the simple old song of 'The Life and Age of Man'". "The Age and Life of Man" that Burns wrote about hearing his mother sing was a 17th-century ballad. it served as the basis of "Man Was Made to Mourn". An early draft of the poem was included in The First Commonplace Book, a work that was largely texts intended to be sung to the tunes of existing songs.

== Synopsis ==
"Man Was Made to Mourn" is an eleven stanza dirge by Robert Burns, first published in 1784. The poem was originally intended to be sung to the tune of the song "Peggy Bawn". It is written as if it were being delivered by a wiser old man to a "young stranger" standing in the winter on "the banks of Aire". It includes the stanza:

Many and sharp the num'rous ills
Inwoven with our frame!
More pointed still we make ourselves
Regret, remorse, and shame!
And man, whose heav'n-erected face
The smiles of love adorn,—
Man's inhumanity to man
Makes countless thousands mourn!

== Analysis and reception ==
Despite being based on a 17th-century folk song, the idiom of "man's inhumanity to man" is a distinctly neoclassical rhetorical expression, according to scholar David Daiches, who cites the poem as one of Burns's English works that "use a Scots literary form but are otherwise English in inspiration".

"Man Was Made to Mourn" is one of Burns's many early poems that protest class inequalities. The scholar Nigel Leask writes that the poem includes "surprisingly contemporary themes", noting its "lament for the harshness and brevity of human life" and direct criticism of "hundreds labour[ing] to support / a haughty lordling's pride". It does not offer these poor hope, emphasising the negative sentiment that "man was made to mourn". Leask also notes that the poem supports a right to work by criticising a lord who will not hire a former farmer looking for work.

Critic and author Edwin Muir described "Man Was Made to Mourn" as one of Burns's few poems that clearly expresses his own emotions, describing it as "obviously composed under the stress of deep personal emotion," in contrast to his works that express the personas of other people or groups. Muir considers that this makes the poem "among the worst he [Burns] wrote". McGuirk argues that the poem is representative of Burns's inability in his early poems to conceive of an end other than death to the struggles and injustices of life.

Burns initially wrote the poem in response to pervasive "economic and social injustices" in society. It was well received. The author Thomas De Quincey was deeply impacted by a stanza in the poem about a struggling peasant who was not allowed to work by Cassilis, a wealthy man:

See, yonder poor, o'erlabour'd wight,
So abject, mean and vile,
Who begs a brother of the earth
To give him leave to toil.

De Quincey wrote that "I had for ever ringing in my ears... those groans which ascended to heaven from his over-burdened heart— those harrowing words, "to give him leave to toil". The poem also influenced poet William Wordsworth, most notably in his Lines Written in Early Spring (1798) and "Resolution and Independence" (1802). McGuirk describes the poem and "Despondency: An Ode" as serving as a touchstone "for later poets in and out of Scotland." However, in the years since its publication, the poem has been more broadly applied to wars and genocides.

=== "Man's inhumanity to man" ===
The line "man's inhumanity to man" has been widely quoted since Burns' poem was first published, in reference to wars, mistreatment of indigenous peoples and nations, and, according to historian Mark Celinscak, other "acts of extreme violence". In his 2009 biography on Burns, Robert Crawford wrote that Burns was influenced by the poet Edward Young's Night-Thoughts, which includes discussion on "Man's...endless inhumanities on Man". In 1798 the English poet William Wordsworth adapted it in his Lines Written in Early Spring.

The line is still broadly associated with Burns' poem. Celinscak writes that the phrase has become banal due to "decades of overuse", noting that it was commonly used to describe the Bergen-Belsen concentration camp during the Second World War. The line was cited six times by Martin Luther King Jr. in his autobiography.

== Illustrations ==
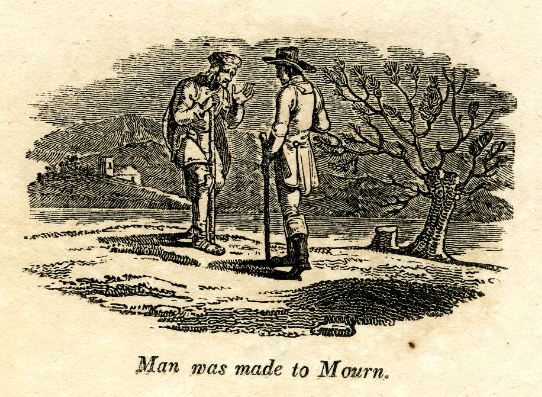

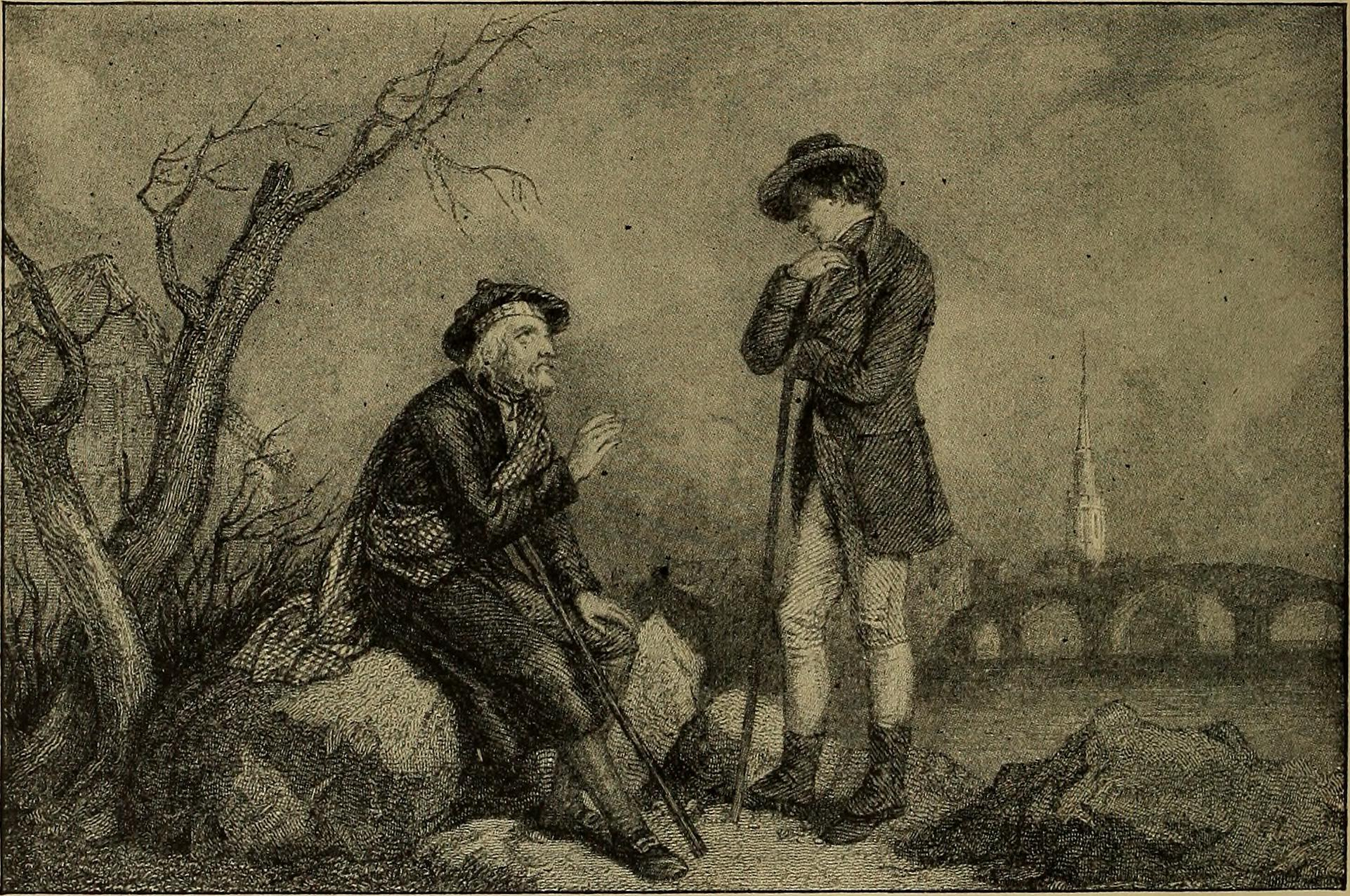

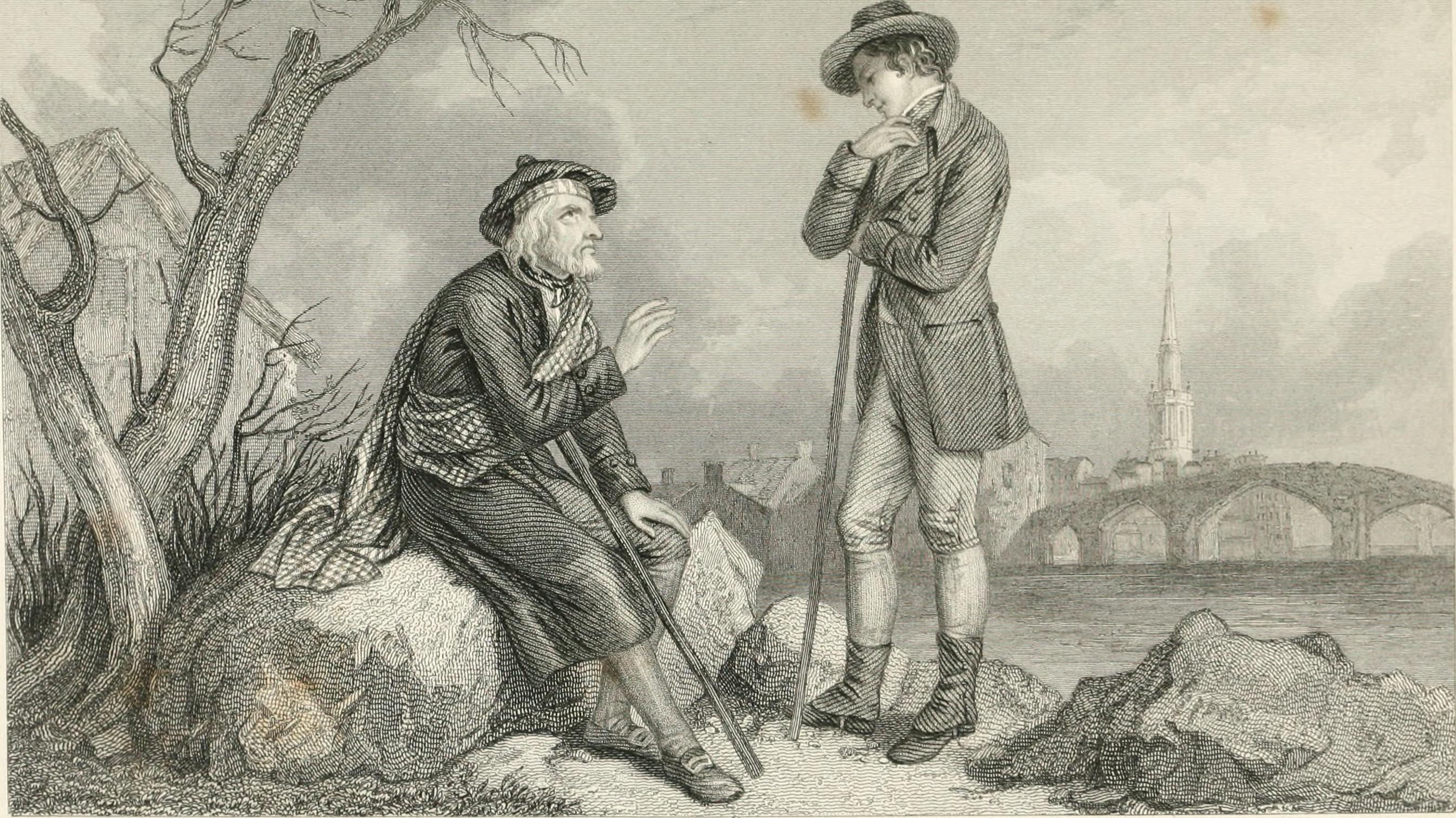

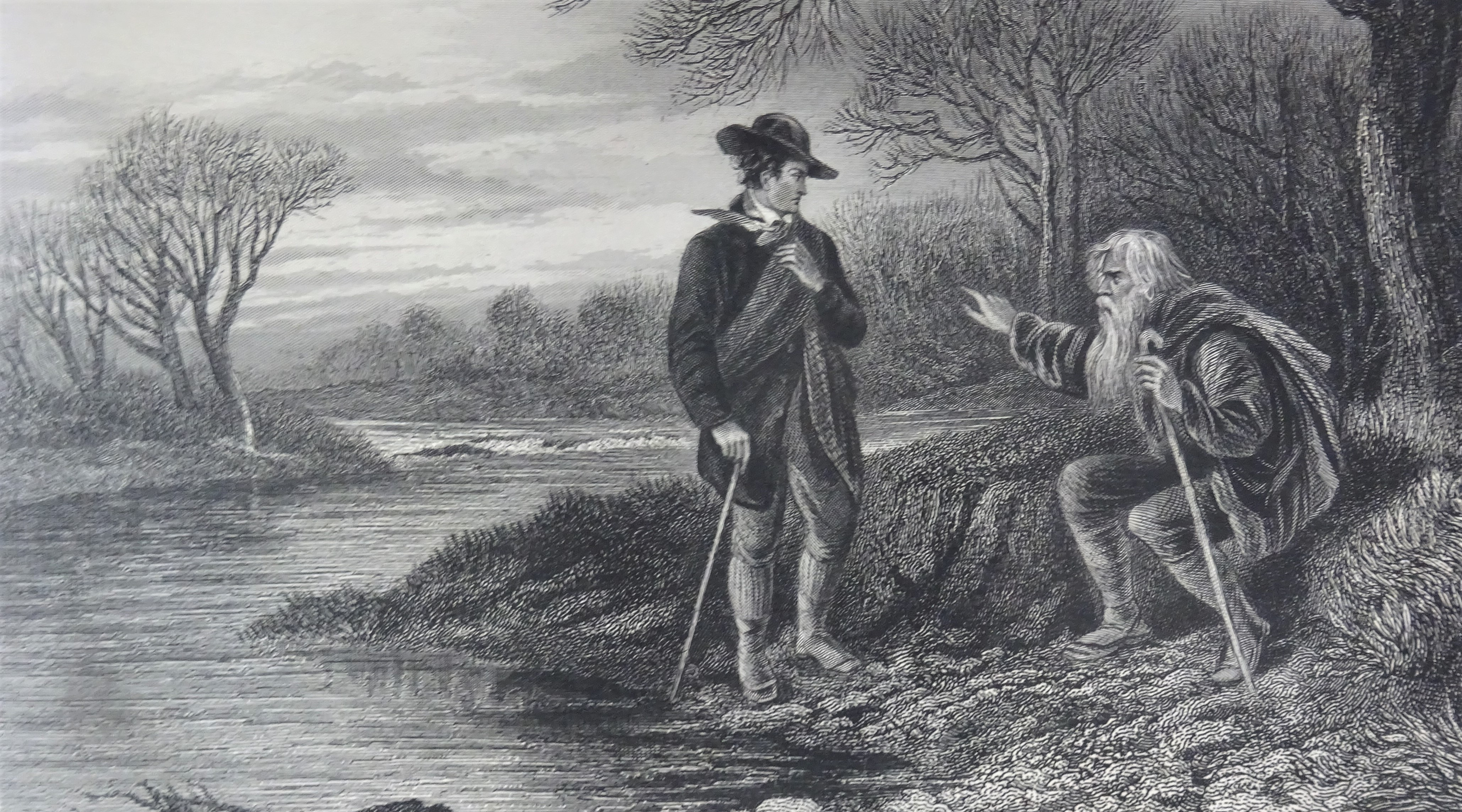

== Bibliography ==
- Broadhead, Alex (2014). The Language of Robert Burns: Style, Ideology, and Identity. Bucknell University Press. ISBN 978-1-61148-528-8.
- Celinscak, Mark (2015). Distance from the Belsen Heap: Allied Forces and the Liberation of a Nazi Concentration Camp. University of Toronto Press. ISBN 978-1-4426-1570-0.
- Crawford, Robert (2009). The Bard. London: Jonathan Cape. ISBN 9780224077682.
- Cunningham, Allan, ed. (1855). The Complete Works of Robert Burns. Boston: Phillips, Sampson, and Company. pp. 95–96.
- Dabundo, Laura (2009). Encyclopedia of Romanticism (Routledge Revivals): Culture in Britain, 1780s-1830s. Routledge. ISBN 978-1-135-23235-1.
- Hughey, Michael W. (2016). New Tribalisms: The Resurgence of Race and Ethnicity. Springer. ISBN 978-1-349-26403-2.
- Jack, R. D. S.; Noble, Andrew, eds. (1982). "Introduction". The Art of Robert Burns. Vision Press. pp. 7–21. ISBN 0389202037.
- Leask, Nigel (2010). "Pastoral Politics". Robert Burns and Pastoral: Poetry and Improvement in Late Eighteenth-Century Scotland. pp. 115–143. doi:10.1093/acprof:oso/9780199572618.003.0005. ISBN 978-0-19-957261-8.
- McGuirk, Carol (2015). Reading Robert Burns: Texts, Contexts, Transformations. Routledge. ISBN 978-1-317-31734-0.
- Roth, Hans Ingvar (2018). P. C. Chang and the Universal Declaration of Human Rights. University of Pennsylvania Press. ISBN 978-0-8122-9547-4.
- Weston, John C. (1982). "Robert Burns's Satire". In Jack, R. D. S.; Noble, Andrew (eds.). The Art of Robert Burns. Vision Press. pp. 36–58. ISBN 0389202037.
