= Francis Wilford =

English Indologist and Orientalist (1761–1822)

Francis Wilford (1761–1822) was an Indologist, Orientalist, fellow member of the Asiatic Society of Bengal, and constant collaborator of its journal – Asiatic Researches – contributing a number of fanciful, sensational, controversial, and highly unreliable articles on ancient Hindu geography, mythography, and other subjects.

He contributed a series of ten articles about Hindu geography and mythology for Asiatic Researches, between 1799 and 1810, claiming that all European myths were of Hindu origin and that India had produced a Christ (Salivahana) whose life and works closely resembled the Christ of Bible. He also claimed to have discovered a Sanskrit version of Noah (Satyavrata) and attempted to confirm the historicity of revelation and of the ethnology of Genesis from external sources, particularly Hindu or other pagan religions. In his essay Mount Caucasus – 1801, he argued for a Himalayan location of Mt. Ararat, claiming that Ararat was etymologically linked with Āryāvarta – a Sanskrit name for India.

== Biography ==
Born in 1761 at Hanover and was a Hanoverian by birth – There was a persistent and unproven belief among his contemporaries and later commentators that he was of Swiss or German descent. He arrived in India as an ensign of the East India Company army in 1781[as a Lieutenant colonel with the Hanoverian reinforcements to the British troops in India], and he stayed for four decades in India. He married Khanum Bibi, an Indian woman, and their daughters later married East India Company soldiers.

Between 1786 and 1790, he worked as an assistant to the Surveyor General; accordingly, he did surveying and created Military route maps in Bihar and then moved with his section to Benares. During this period, he met Mughal Beg, a Muslim, whom Wilford later described as his "friend"; Mughal Beg appears to have been a Pundit or Pandit – native surveyor -, an aide for the survey involved in carrying out large scale exploration for Wilford in North-western India-Southern Punjab and Bawalpur -, in the late 1790s.

He became the member of the Sanskrit scholars and Orientalists circle associated with Asiatic Society of Bengal that included William Jones, Charles Wilkins, H.H. Wilson, and H.T. Colebrooke. He retired from army in 1794 and then settled in Benares where he became the Secretary to the committee of Sanskrit College, Varanasi – recently founded by British resident Jonathan Duncan in the city – funded by East India Company for the training of Pandits in Sanskrit language and literature. Wilford exercised great influence in the college, including efforts to get his own nominee for the position of Chief Pandit, just before his death too.

=== Construction of Hindu geography and mythography ===
Wilford employed a large staff of Indian assistants – Pandits [copyists, translators, surveyors]. Throughout the 1790s, he laboriously combed Puranic and other Sanskrit sources for geographical materials. He extracted his geographical material from the historical poems or legendary tales of the Hindus collected for him by his staff.

Christopher Bayly, writing in a collection edited by Jamal Malik, also observes that Wilford, like some contemporaries, used cruder means of linguistic correlation. According to Bayly, the preferred method of Wilford was to sit in the company of Pandits and other Hindus, recite together with them stories from puranic and western mythology, scripture and history, finding matches and points of similarity. This correspondence was a key to find a linguistic match between similar words; thus, Misra in the Puranas was Al-Misr – ancient name for Egypt.

Nigel Leask, an author, in his Francis Wilford and the colonial construction of Hindu geography, 1799–1822 says "properly speaking, there was no such thing as ancient 'Hindu geography', Wilford was led to admit that his work was more in the nature of a construction than a simple translation of his sources." Leask points that:

Sanskrit Cosmography had been metamorphosed into geography by 'follow[ing] the track, real or imaginary, of [Hindu] deities and heroes; comparing all their legends with such accounts of holy places in the regions of the west...preserved by Greek mythologists; and endeavouring to provide the identity of the places by the similarity of the names and remarkable circumstances'.

According to Leask, by proceeding in this manner, Wilford was simply following the methodology of William Jones and other Orientalists of the 18th century in syncretising Sanskrit with Classical and Biblical narratives, establishing transcultural correspondences by means of often crude conjectural etymologies. Albeit, Wilford's reputation did not win the scientific respectability for his proposed theories, his work[s] did exert a lasting influence in early 18th century antiquarians and Romanic poets like S.T. Coleridge, Robert Southey, Percy Shelley, and Tom Moore.

Wilford claimed to have discovered the Sanskrit version of the story of Noah (who had three sons – Japheth, Ham, and Shem) named Satyavrata (in Sanskrit) and his three sons Jyapeti, Charma, and Sharma from a Vedic scripture titled Padma-puran. The actual scriptural text does not attest Wilford's version. As unearthed by Nigel Leask, the story goes this way—Aftermath the dispersion of Babylonian, the sons of Sharma had emigrated to the banks of Nile or Cali. The Negro sons of Charma – cursed as he scoffed at Noah -, had emigrated to India and then from there to Egypt. Wilford claimed to have found proof of this based on the fact that "the very ancient statues of Gods in India have crisp hair, and the features of Negroes," in contrast to modern denizens. In Egypt, the Semites – sons of Sharma -, by now well-settled, had expelled the Hasyasilas – sons of Charma -, into the desert, from there they populated and spread the entire African continent. Nigel Leask identifies this as a colonial construction of racial hierarchy to subordinate Egypt to India :

This subordination of Egypt to India in terms of chronological priority is accompanied by a distinctly colonial construction of racial hierarchy in which the inhabitants of contemporary Africa are equated with the aboriginal inhabitants of India, both descended from the proscribed family of Ham, Charma, or Hasyasilas('the laughter').

Sara Suleri, an author and professor, in her essay Burke and the Indian Sublime has described "the central representational unavailability that Indian cultures and histories, even in sheer geography....pos[ed] to the colonizing eye." On account of this discursive difficulty, Wilford's projects appears to be inspired by a will to "assimilate the cultural heterogeneity of India into the metanarratives of European universal history and geography."

=== MSS for H.H.Wilson research ===
In Benares, Wilford procured many MSS – Manuscripts by employing a large staff of Pandit copyists and translators; He sent those MSS and their copies to H.H. Wilson and other Orientalists associated with Asiatic Society of Bengal. He also built up his own library, and had been maintained and managed by his wife – Khanum Bibi, after his death in 1822. The findings and observations of Wilford's MSS were used as a base for Wilson's own researches in Sanskrit grammarians – especially Pāṇini.

After the death of Wilford, Edward Fell, a Panini Scholar and Superintendent of the Sanskrit College, wrote to Wilson in irritation as :

Mother Wilford[Khanum Bibi] is forming a catalogue of her books(the Mss. are reckoned too sacred for any inspection, excepting from her Mohammedan paramours!!)

== His claims ==
In 1788 Wilford claimed to have found innumerable references to ancient Egypt, its Kings and holy places in Puranas by publishing a long text of baroque complexity in Asiatic Researches; He inferred that a group of Indians had settled on the banks of Nile, Egyptian and Hindu learning had been linked, and what the Western learning transmitted through Greeks was consequence of partly Hindu origin. However, Wilford was forced to admit with a humiliating note in the same journal that he had been systematically duped by his head Pandit between 1793 and 1805.

During the 1790s, for some years, rumours circulated about Wilford's discoveries evincing the relationship among Hindu traditions, Bible, and the ancient British antiquities in Orientalist and antiquarian circles in Bengal. In an article on Hindu Mathematics published by Ruben Burrow for Asiatic Researches, Ruben announced the Wilford's work as the "first true representation of scriptural and Hindu geography." Ruben even deduced from Wilford's evidence saying "the Druids of Britain were Brahmins is beyond the least shadow of doubt."

In 1799 Wilford published his first essay entitled On Egypt and Other countries adjacent to the Cali [Ca'li'] River or Nile of Ethiopia from the ancient books of the Hindus, claiming to have discovered Sanskrit version of Abyssinia (Ethiopia – modern nation or Cushadweepa – Sanskrit name for Abyssinia or Ethiopia) and the river Nile which corroborated some of the proposed theories of James Bruce, a Scottish traveller and writer, that the site of the terrestrial paradise was the source of Nile in the unexplored mountains of Ethiopia.

According to Nigel Leask, in Francis Wilford and the colonial construction of Hindu geography, 1799–1822, Wilford published an essay in 1799 entitled On Egypt and Other countries adjacent to the Cali [Ca'li'] River or Nile of Ethiopia from the ancient books of the Hindus claiming to have found a Sanskrit version of the story of Noah – Satyavrayata, and his three sons Jyapete, Charma, and Sharma. Regina Akel, an author of Maria Graham: a literary biography, says Maria Graham played a part in this "Colonial myth building that justified Colonialism by pointing common historical and religious roots between East and West." Regina further observes that Maria Graham in his Letters on India, repeated many of the theories proposed by Wilford; however, she added a proviso that she was not convinced of their veracity. Regina points that Graham's strategy was to build up the Wilford's image as a learned scholar and also in ignoring the scandal that erupted in India in 1805, following Wilford's own confession in Asiatic Researches.

Wilford, based on Indian texts [Sanskrit texts in Manuscripts] tried to prove that India and Egypt from ancient times had a close contact and their religions came from a common source – Noah's Ark. For this, Wilford had employed some Indian assistants – Pandits, and made them look for precise set of topics, namely, the deluge, the name of Noah and his sons, and so forth.

According to Bayly, in the edited volume Perspectives of mutual encounters in South Asian history, 1760–1860, Wilford tried to find three types of links or analogue between the ancient Indian wisdom of the Vedas and Puranas; and the knowledge of the ancient Egyptian, Israelites, and Greeks. First, he believed, he would discover the traces of an ancient Indo-European mother tongue as confirmed by William Jones. Second, the inheritance of common store of sacred lore- underlying unities in human mythology, Biblical, and Classical – Wiford thought, he saw a link between the stories of Bacchus, Osiris, and the Hindu Purusha. Third, as ancient Eurasian and African society had developed links of trade to complement the ancient patterns of pilgrimage – Wilford believed many historic people had physically migrated over large distances – With no surprise, groups of Indians migrated to Egypt and Ethiopia.

In words of Bayly, though Wilford's reasoning could be applied to the history of all humanity and much of it was not specifically generated to further the British conquest of India, yet some stories and legends narrated by him were meant for naturalising the British presence in the subcontinent – suggesting Political agenda. Most of Wilford's works were filled with traces of Alexander the Great and with references to Arien.

He also claimed and asserted that the primitive Christianity had been established in Indian subcontinent based on findings of the Antonio Monserette, a 17th-century Jesuit, and on the reports of tombs and rock-carvings with supposedly Christian iconography observed in North India by Moghul Beg – who was searching for traces of ancient Kings, Mughal emperors, Sufi saints, and Christian bishops in Northwestern India and Central Asia, under Wilford's auspices – Moghul Beg travelled in Northwestern India and adjacent regions beyond the frontier – covering Afghanistan, Derajat, Peshawar, and Qashqar -, collecting topographical information. Wilford argued that a branch of the Manichaean creed had spread over Northern India and Western India in the early centuries of Christ. In 1803, he published his papers claiming that the ancient Christian Crosses had been allegedly unearthed in Kerala, prompting an uproar from Hindu and Muslim as they viewed these reported findings as an asserted foundation status of Christianity in India, and also a threat to their authority.

In an essay on the Sacred Isles in the West (the principal of which is Sweta Dweepa – White Islands) in Hindu tradition published by Wilford, he claimed that the Isles concerned were, in fact, British Isles, and the ancient Hindus venerated them; This discovery and claim, according to Bayly, did strengthen the idea that the connection between India and Britain was somehow providential and ancient; thus, should be renewed to rescue the Indian branch of Aryan culture from the consequences of its degeneration. Wilford argued that the "source of 'all fundamental and mysterious transactions of [the Hindu] religion' were none other than the British Isles. The origin of Indian religion and culture is claimed to be located in the remote northern islands of the Britain [that colonised India before] itself rather than in the Abyssinia or Hindu Kush," according to Nigel Leask.

Wilford claimed the existence of a Sanskrit Belt, 40 degrees broad and across the Old Continent, in a SE and NW direction, from the eastern shores of the Malay Peninsula to the western extremity of the British isles. Wilford, in fact, attributed lotus-like division of Old Continent to his puranic source as:

lotus-like division of the old continent into seven 'dwipas' or climates centred on Mount Meru, from whence four rivers flowed to the cardinal points of the earth. Moving in a north-westerly direction from Jambu (India), the six dwipas were as follows: Cusa (the country between the Persian Gulf, the Caspian Sea, and the Western boundary of India); Placsha (Asia Minor, Armenia, etc,.); Salmali (Eastern Europe, bounded on the west by the Baltic and Adriatic Seas); Crauncha (Germany, France, and the northern parts of Italy); Sacam – alternatively Swetam, the White Islands (The British Isles, surrounded by the 'sea of milk'); Pushcara (Iceland)

Wilford claimed that the "coming of a saviour from the West is foretold," based on Sanskrit texts in procured manuscripts (both Puranas and Vedas) – This he claimed, by identifying White Isles with the geographical British Isles. For this, he asserted that the Brahmins proclaim that "every man after death must go to 'Tri-Cuta' and Sweta...there to stand trial before the king of justice, the Dharma-raja" – signifying, the British Isles are "the beginning and the end of the worldly pilgrimage.". The Puranas also declare "the White Isles to be the home of Vishnu, from whence Krishna (like Noah and Dionysus, apparently originally British national) brought the Vedas. Vyasa, the first who presumed to write the Vedas down in a book, resided so long in the White Isles that he was nicknamed Dwaipayana, he who resided in the islands." Furthering this, he asserted that "the light of revelation came from the west, and the vedas reside in the White Islands in human shape," as they are not written, instead orally delivered. He also claimed to have discovered the Indo-Sanskrit Ursprung(German:source or origin) itself derived from an anterior, British source.

According to Nigel Leask, Wilford narrated the story of Salivahana that the child had born to a virgin and a carpenter, later became a mystic, and finally crucified in a Y-shaped plough. In 1805, Wilford had confessed publicly that some of the manuscripts he had been working were, in fact, forged, though, he didn't specifically refer to the Salivahana story; later, when he had published in 1807 – 2 years after his confession -, he preceded it with a disclaimer as:

The Salivahana story 'is a most crude and undigested mass of heterogeneous legends taken from the apocryphal gospel of the infancy of Christ, the tales of the Rabbis and Talmudists concerning Solomon, with some particulars about Muhammed...jumbled together with...the history of the Persian kings of the Sassanian dynasty.

=== Deception and forgery ===
Wilford later admitted his guilt; according to Indira Ghose, that the Hindu expert who had been providing him manuscripts and who had been assisting him in his studies of sacred texts had corroborated the veracity of his religious theories. Wilford smartly blamed the fraud on someone else, and said:

In order to avoid the trouble of consulting books, he conceived the idea of framing legends from what he recollected from the Puranas, and from what he had picked up in conversation with me. As he was exceedingly well read in the Puranas, and other similar books ...it was an easy task for him; and he studied to introduce as much truth as he could, to obviate the danger of immediate detection...His forgeries were of three kinds; in the first there was only a word or two altered; in the second were such legends as had undergone a more material alteration; and in the third all those which he had written from memory.(Wilford 1805:251)

This deception of Wilford, although aimed at fooling Indians into Christianity, had become the theme of general campaign by European intellectuals to belittle Indian learning against some respect which it had before. This was naturally followed by flurry of other bogus claims of deceptions by Indian informants in the fields of Medicine, Astronomy, and Literature. Wilford tried to hide his fraudulent ways and wrote to H.H. Wilson that:

he was really disgusted with the blunders, anachronisms, contradictions, etc,. of the puranics [Pandits versed in the Puranas] and their followers.

With failing health and criticism, he gradually retreated from the study of Sanskrit literature to the study of Geography and gave up hopes of Christianising India via his pro-British propaganda. At the end of his life, he was comparing geographical texts in Sanskrit with the corpus of classical Greek and Latin literature, which was finally published as the Geography of ancient India, posthumously.

== Criticism ==
Wilford was severely criticised by his contemporaries and historians. He was considered as an eccentric subaltern in the army of Orientalism. Bernard Cohn, an anthropologist and research-scholar of British colonialism in India, censured and noted him only as a "military engineer and commentator on Benares' unpleasant drainage system." Garland Cannon criticised him for misleading William Jones, and his criticism implied that "his Indian languages were poor." Joseph Schwartzberg, a professor of geography and an author, denounced Wilford's "gullibility" – as he was looking for classical, Biblical, and Egyptian place names in Puranas as those texts were not scientific -, but recognised his importance in the history of Indian Cartography.

Friedrich Schlegel, an author and poet, in his essay On the Language and Wisdom of India (Über die Sprache und Weisheit der Indier, in German language) applauded Wilford's putative discovery of the Indian origin of Egyptian civilisation, establishing India as the Ursprung, to settle the long-standing controversy about the relative antiquity of the two civilisations – India and Egypt. Although Schlegel supported the extreme views of Wilford as "Everything, absolutely everything, is of Indian origin," yet he denounced Wilford; later, for his fanciful temerity as:

the fanciful temerity of a Wilford was bringing discredit on the Indian researches—a temerity which would necessarily provoke a re-action, and lead, as in some recent instances, to a prosaic narrow-mindedness, that would seek to bring down the whole system of Indian civilization to the dull level of its own vulgar conceptions.

Nigel Leask, summing up all of Wilford's putative discoveries and later disavowing them for having been based on forged documents, Leask describes Wilford's work as:

an orientalized (in Edward Said's sense of the word) version of British national and imperial ideology.

== See also ==
- Ancient Egyptian Race Controversy – Indian Hypothesis
- Sons of Noah
