= Regius Professor of English Language and Literature =

Regius Chair of English Language and Literature University of Glasgow
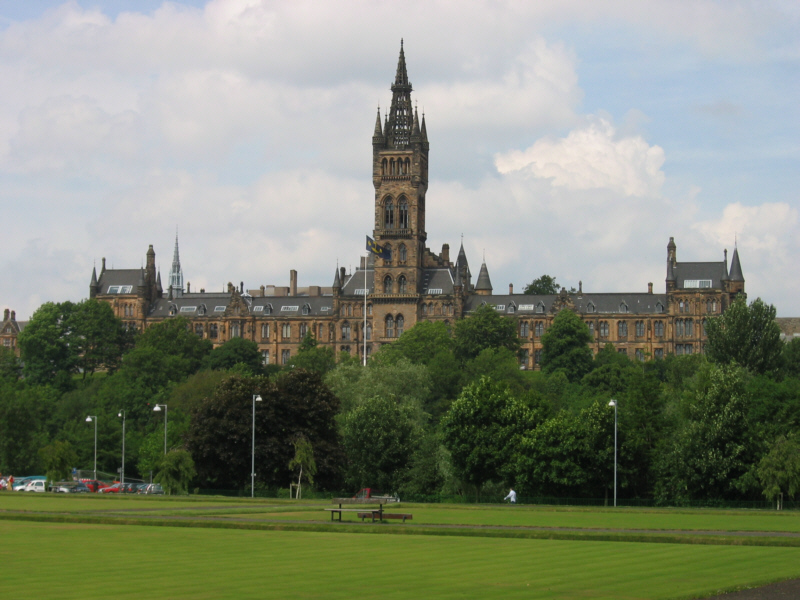
- Incumbent; Nigel Leask since 2004
- Formation: 1861
- First holder: John Nichol
- Website: www.gla.ac.uk/englishliterature

The Regius Chair of English Language and Literature at the University of Glasgow was founded in 1861 by Queen Victoria, and is the only Regius Professorship in the Faculty of Arts.

== History ==
The first professor appointed was John Nichol, a graduate of the university and Snell Exhibitioner at Balliol College, Oxford, and son of John Pringle Nichol, former Regius Professor of Astronomy at the university. Nichol had formerly been a coach at the University of Oxford, where along with A. V. Dicey, Vinerian Professor of English Law, philosopher Thomas Hill Green and poet Algernon Charles Swinburne he formed the Old Mortality Society, a literary discussion society. Whilst at Glasgow, Nichol maintained his strong reputation in literary criticism, lecturing at the same time at Oxford as well as tutoring privately across the country. He was also a supporter of the higher education of women. He left the chair in 1889 and died in 1894. In 1885, the Nichol Prize for the most distinguished woman student in the Ordinary class of English Literature was founded by his sister, Lucy Jack.

Nichol was succeeded in 1889 by Andrew Cecil Bradley, a highly respected literary critic and noted scholar of Shakespeare, and brother of philosopher Francis Bradley. Bradley had studied at Balliol College, Oxford, and was at the time of his appointment a lecturer at University College Liverpool, now the University of Liverpool. In 1892, Bradley described his Glasgow students as "a set of savages whom it is a loathsome drudgery to teach," although he remained at the university until 1900, and in 1901 was elected Professor of Poetry at the University of Oxford. He delivered the 1907-1908 Gifford Lectures at the university. The Bradley Chair of English Literature was named after him, and his name was placed on the Memorial Gates erected to mark the university's quincentenary in 1951.

The Gifford Lectures, a series of which Bradley delivered at the university, were instituted by the will of Adam Gifford, Lord Gifford, and it was his nephew, Walter Raleigh, who succeeded Bradley in the Regius Chair in 1900. Raleigh had studied at University College London and King's College, Cambridge, where he was president of the Cambridge Union, and was appointed the first Professor of English Literature at the Mohammedan Anglo-Oriental College in Aligarh, India. He then worked as Professor of Modern Literature at University College, Liverpool before being appointed to the Regius Chair in 1900. He remained in the chair for only four years, being appointed Merton Professor of English Literature in 1904. He was knighted in 1911.

In 1904, the celebrated Scottish author, William Macneile Dixon, was appointed to the chair. He studied at Trinity College, Dublin and had previously been Professor of English Literature at the University of Birmingham. He was succeeded in 1935 by Peter Alexander, who had been the Queen Margaret Lecturer in English Literature. He retired in 1963 and was awarded a CBE in 1964. In 1965, Peter Butter was appointed to the chair, having previously been Professor of English at Queen's University Belfast. He retired in 1986 and was succeeded in 1990 by Stephen Prickett. Prickett was a Fulbright Scholar in 1979 and has taught at a number of institutions, including the University of Sussex, University of Minnesota and Australian National University, Canberra. He retired in 2001.

In 2004, Nigel Leask, Reader in Romantic Literature at the University of Cambridge, was appointed to the chair.

== Regius Professors of English Language and Literature ==
- John Nichol (1862–1889)
- A. C. Bradley (1889–1900)
- Sir Walter Raleigh (1900–1904)
- William Macneile Dixon (1904–1935)
- Peter Alexander (1935–1963)
- Peter Herbert Butter (1965–1986)
- Stephen Prickett (1990–2001)
- Nigel Leask (2004–)

== See also ==
- List of Professorships at the University of Glasgow
