= John Nichol (biographer) =

Scottish writer and scholar (1833–1894)

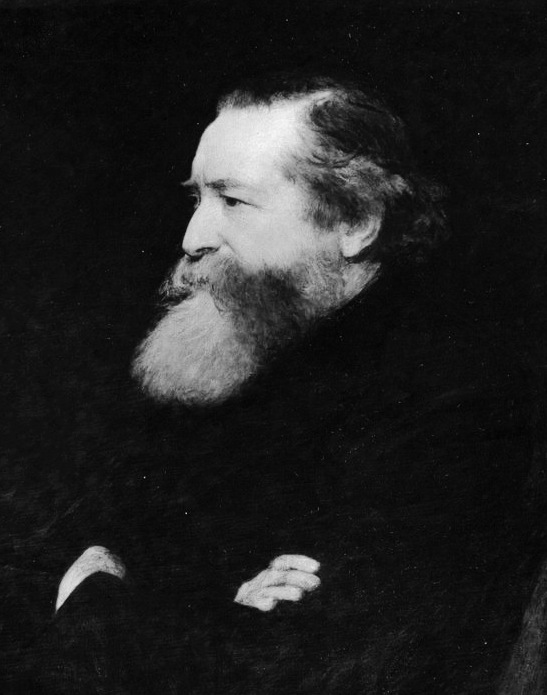
- Portrait of John Nichol, c. 1870
- Born: 8 September 1833; Montrose, Forfarshire, Scotland
- Died: 11 October 1894 (aged 61); Kensington, London, England
- Occupations: Literary scholar; academic; writer
- Spouse: Jane Stuart Bell (m. 1861; died 1894)
- Children: 3
- Father: John Pringle Nichol
- Relatives: Henry Glassford Bell (father-in-law} Elizabeth Pease Nichol (stepmother)

Academic background
- Education: Balliol College, Oxford

Signature
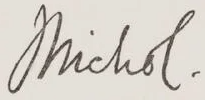

John Nichol (8 September 1833 – 11 October 1894), was a Scottish literary scholar, academic, writer who served as the first Regius Professor of English Language and Literature at the University of Glasgow. He was well known for his drama Hannibal (1873) as well as his biographies of Robert Burns, Lord Byron, and of his friend Thomas Carlyle. He is also well known for his books Tables of European Literature and History (1876) and Tables of Ancient Literature and History (1877).

== Early life ==
Nichol was born on 8 September 1833 in Montrose, Forfarshire (present-day Angus) to Jane Tullis (1809–1850) and John Pringle Nichol, an astronomer and political economist.

John Jr. studied first at Glasgow (1848–55) and then Balliol College, Oxford (1855–9) as a Snell Exhibitioner, graduating with a First-Class degree in Classics, Philosophy and Mathematics. After graduating, Nicholl remained at Oxford as a coach. With Albert Venn Dicey, Thomas Hill Green, Swinburne and others, he formed the Old Mortality Society for discussions on literary matters.

== Glasgow ==
In 1862 he was made Regius Professor of English Literature at Glasgow. He had already made a reputation as an acute critic and a successful lecturer, and his influence at Glasgow was very marked. During his tenure as Regius Professor, he also lectured at Oxford University as well as private tutoring across Britain, and formed a strong reputation as an inspiring lecturer, later joining Glasgow's Dialectic Society.

He left Glasgow for London in 1889, and died on 11 October 1894. A Memoir by Professor Knight was published in 1896.

== Works ==
Among the major works by Nichol were his drama Hannibal (1873), The Death of Themistocles, and other Poems (1881), his Byron in the "English Men of Letters" series (1880), his Robert Burns (1882) and Carlyle (1892).

Nichol was also an enthusiastic Americanist and wrote the ground-breaking American Literature: An Historical Review, 1620–1880 (1882). He visited the United States in 1865, and in 1882 he wrote the article on American literature for the ninth edition of the Encyclopædia Britannica.

In addition to the above, he was also the author of the following works:

- Fragments of Criticism, a volume of essays, (1860);
- Tables of European Literature and History, A.D. 200-1876 (1876);
- Tables of Ancient Literature and History, (1877);
- English Composition, a literature primer, (1879);
- Questions on English Composition, (1890); and
- two volumes on Lord Bacon's Life and Philosophy for Black's "Series of Philosophical Writers", (1887–89).

Nichol also wrote essays for the Westminster Review, North British Review, and other reviews; articles in the Encyclopædia Britannica; and several pamphlets on education questions.

Nichol was long blamed by biographers of the poet Swinburne for leading Swinburne to lose his faith and to alcoholism. Neither charge is true (See Terry L. Meyers, "On Drink and Faith: Swinburne and John Nichol at Oxford". Review of English Studies, ns 55:220 (June 2004), 392–424).

== Personal life ==
On 10 April 1861, Nichol married Jane Stuart Nichol (née Bell), the daughter of Henry Glassford Bell. Together they had three children before Jane's death on 9 January 1894.

Through his father Nichol was the stepson of Elizabeth Pease Nichol, an abolitionist.

On 11 October 1894, Nichol died aged 61 at his home in Kensington.

Academic offices
Preceded by Chair founded	Regius Professor of English Language and Literature, University of Glasgow; 1862–1889	Succeeded by A. C. Bradley
