= Timeline of Shakespeare criticism =

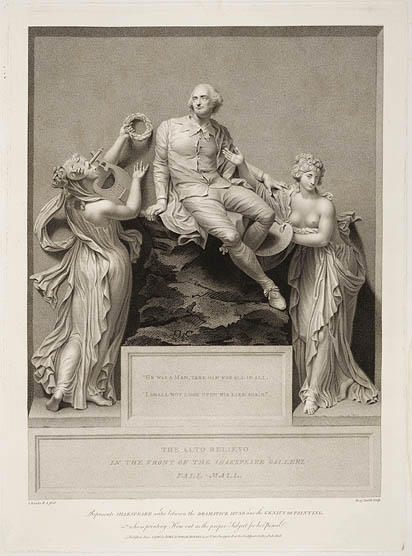
Engraving of Shakespeare: the term "bardolatry" derives from Shaw's coinage "Bardolator", combining the words "bard" and "idolatry" by refers to the excessive adulation of Shakespeare.

This article is a collection of quotations and other comments on English playwright William Shakespeare and his works.

Shakespeare enjoyed recognition in his own time, but in the 17th century, some poets and authors began to consider him as the supreme dramatist and poet of all times of the English language. No other dramatist has been performed even remotely as often on the British (and later the world) stage as Shakespeare. Editors and critics have studied the dramatic performances of his texts as well as the language of Shakespeare. His works are read and studied not only by poets and authors, but also by psychoanalysts, psychologists and philosophers.

== 17th century ==
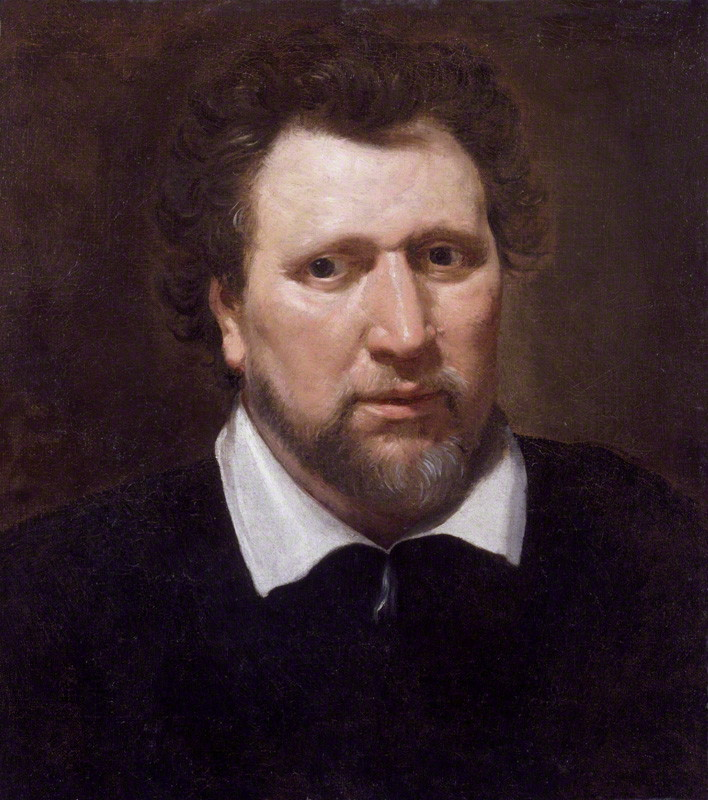
Ben Jonson: "He was not of an age, but for all time."

Ben Jonson, 1630: "I remember the players have often mentioned it as an honor to Shakespeare, that in his writing, whatsoever he penned, he never blotted out a line. My answer hath been, 'Would he had blotted a thousand,' which they thought a malevolent speech. I had not told posterity this but for their ignorance, who chose that circumstance to commend their friend by wherein he most faulted; and to justify mine own candor, for I loved the man, and do honor his memory on this side idolatry as much as any. He was, indeed, honest, and of an open and free nature; had an excellent fancy, brave notions, and gentle expressions, wherein he flowed with that facility that sometime it was necessary he should be stopped. 'Sufflaminandus erat,' as Augustus said of Haterius. His wit was in his own power; would the rule of it had been so too. Many times he fell into those things, could not escape laughter, as when he said in the person of Caesar, one speaking to him: 'Caesar, thou dost me wrong.' He replied: 'Caesar did never wrong but with just cause;' and such like, which were ridiculous. But he redeemed his vices with his virtues. There was ever more in him to be praised than to be pardoned." "Timber" or "Discoveries"

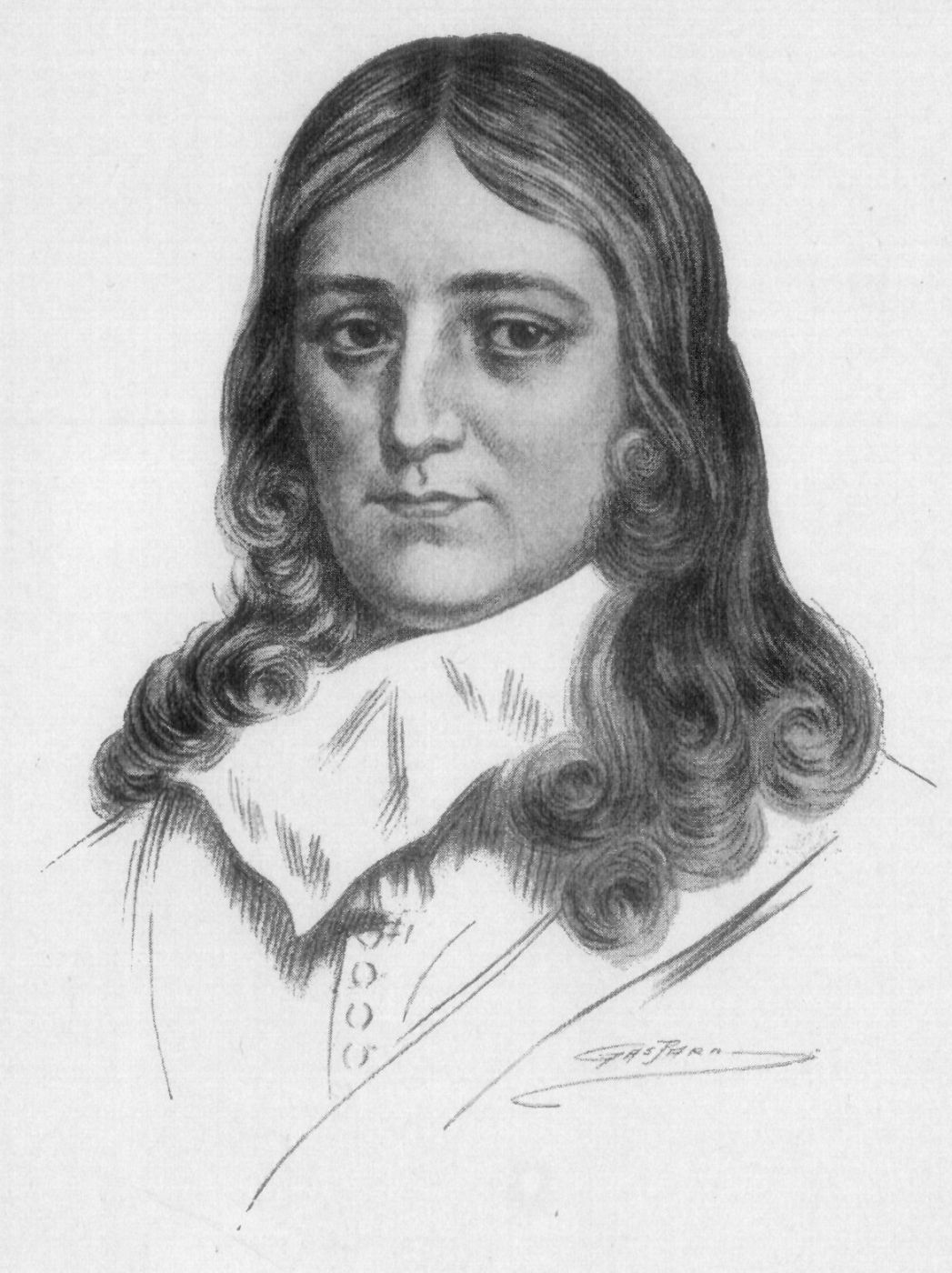
John Milton, 1632: "What need'st thou such weak witnes of thy name?"

John Milton, 1632:

What needs my Shakespeare for his honour'd Bones,
The labour of an age in piled Stones,
Or that his hallow'd reliques should be hid
Under a Star-ypointing Pyramid?
Dear son of memory, great heir of Fame,
What need'st thou such weak witnes of thy name?
Thou in our wonder and astonishment
Hast built thy self a live-long Monument.
For whilst to th' shame of slow-endeavouring art,
Thy easie numbers flow, and that each heart
Hath from the leaves of thy unvalu'd Book,
Those Delphick lines with deep impression took,
Then thou our fancy of it self bereaving,
Dost make us Marble with too much conceaving;
And so Sepulcher'd in such pomp dost lie,
That Kings for such a Tomb would wish to die.

— "On Shakespeare"

"On Shakespeare" was Milton's first published poem & appeared (anonymously) in the 2nd folio of plays by Shakespeare (1632) as "An Epitaph on the admirable Dramaticke Poet, W.SHAKESPEARE".

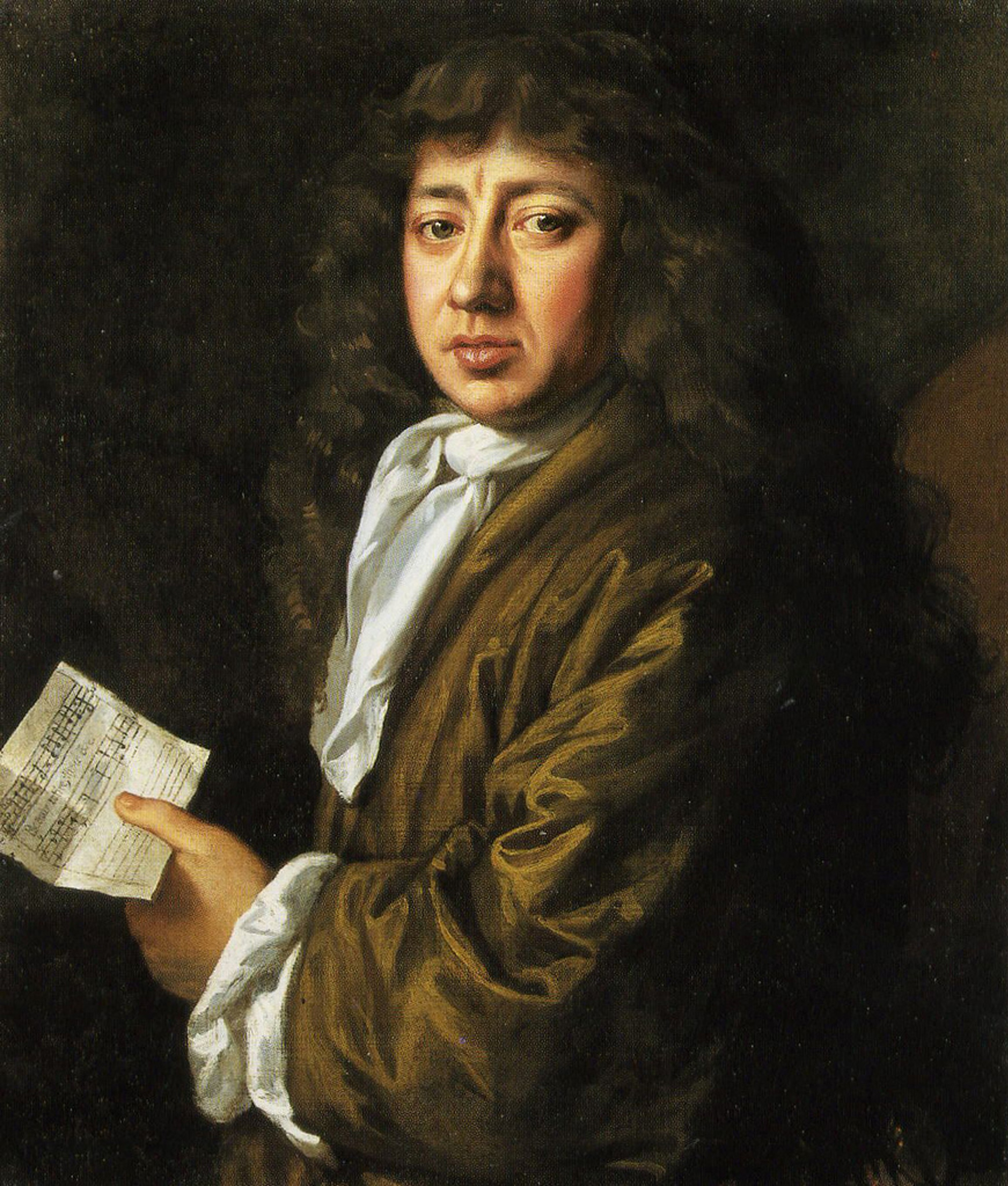
Samuel Pepys, 1662: "...it is the most insipid ridiculous play that ever I saw in my life..."

Samuel Pepys, diary entry for 29 September, 1662: "This day my oaths of drinking wine and going to plays are out, and so I do resolve to take a liberty to-day, and then to fall to them again. To the King's Theatre, where we saw "Midsummer's Night's Dream [sic]," which I had never seen before, nor shall ever again, for it is the most insipid ridiculous play that ever I saw in my life. I saw, I confess, some good dancing and some handsome women, which was all my pleasure."

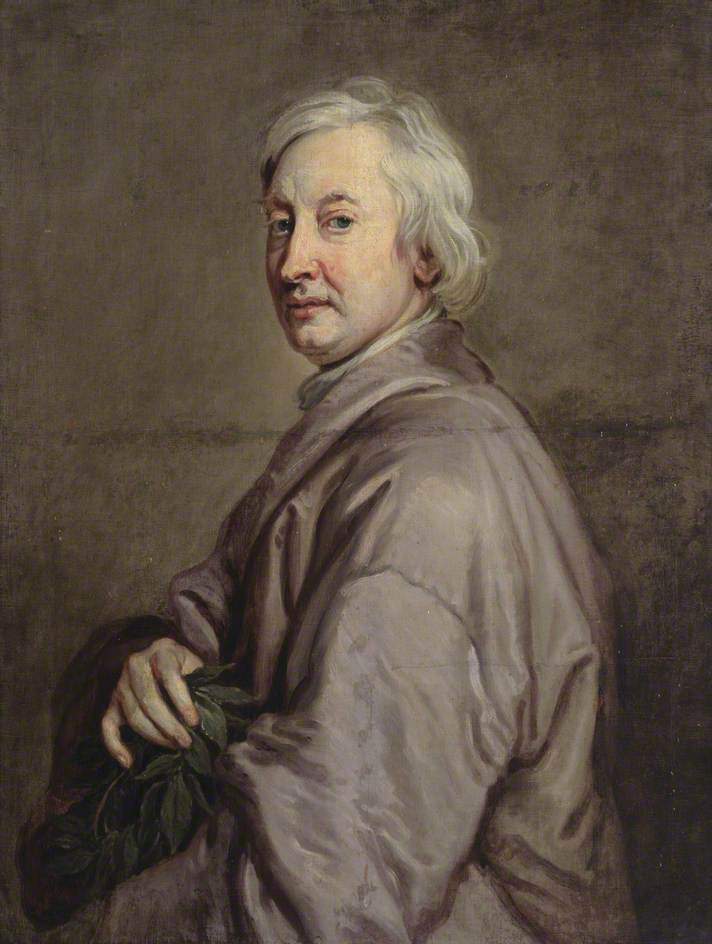
John Dryden, 1668: "All the Images of Nature were still present to him..."

John Dryden, 1668: "To begin then with Shakespeare; he was the man who of all Modern, and perhaps Ancient Poets, had the largest and most comprehensive soul. All the Images of Nature were still present to him, and he drew them not laboriously, but luckily: when he describes any thing, you more than see it, you feel it too. Those who accuse him to have wanted learning, give him the greater commendation: he was naturally learn'd; he needed not the spectacles of Books to read Nature; he look'd inwards, and found her there." Essay of Dramatic Poesy

Thomas Rymer (neo-classical "rules" and "classical unities" extremist), 1692: "The Moral, sure, of this Fable [Othello] is very instructive. First, This may be a caution to all Maidens of Quality how, without their Parents consent, they run away with Blackamoors. Secondly, This may be a warning to all good Wives, that they look well to their Linnen. Thirdly, This may be a lesson to Husbands, that before their Jealousie be Tragical, the proofs may be Mathematical".
(Rymer's notorious attack on Othello ultimately did Shakespeare's reputation more good than harm, by firing up John Dryden, John Dennis and other influential critics into writing eloquent replies.)

Samuel Cobb (1675–1713), translator and master at Christ's Hospital:

"Yet He with Plautus could instruct and please,
And what requir'd long toil, perform with ease
Tho' sometimes Rude, Unpolish'd, and Undress'd,
His Sentence flows more careless than the rest.
But when his Muse complying with his Will,
Deigns with informing heat his Breast to fill,
Then hear him Thunder in the pompous strain
Of Aeschylus, or sooth in Ovid's Vein.
Then in his Artless Tragedies I see,
What Nature seldom gives, Propriety."

From Poetica Brittanici (1700). Cobb provides an example of the diffusion of Jonson's concept of Shakespeare as the "child of nature."

== 18th century ==
Bevill Higgons:

These scenes in their rough native dress were mine,
But now improved with nobler lustre shine;
The first rude sketches Shakespeare's pencil drew,
But all the shining master strokes are new.
This play, ye Critics, shall your fury stand,
Adorned and rescued by a blameless hand.

— "Shakespeare"

From the preface to the revision of The Merchant of Venice (1701) by George Granville, 1st Baron Lansdowne. Here, Shakespeare is made both to recognize his own lack of sophistication and to approve the neoclassical polish added by Granville.

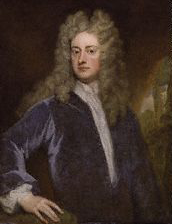
Joseph Addison, 1712: "Among the English, Shakespeare has incomparably excelled all others."

Joseph Addison, 1712: "Among the English, Shakespeare has incomparably excelled all others. That noble extravagance of fancy, which he had in so great perfection, thoroughly qualified him to touch... his reader's imagination, and made him capable of succeeding, where he had nothing to support him besides the strength of his own genius." Spectator no. 419

Alexander Pope, 1725: "His Characters are so much Nature her self that 'tis a sort of injury to call them by so distant a name as Copies of her. Those of other Poets have a constant resemblance, which shews that they receiv'd them from one another and were but multiplyers of the same image: each picture like a mock-rainbow is but the reflexion of a reflexion. But every single character in Shakespeare is as much an Individual as those in Life itself; it is as impossible to find any two alike; and such as from their relation or affinity in any respect appear most to be Twins will upon comparison be found remarkably distinct. To this life and variety of Character we must add the wonderful Preservation of it; which is such throughout his plays that had all the Speeches been printed without the very names of the persons I believe one might have apply'd them with certainty to every speaker. . . . I will conclude by saying of Shakespeare, that with all his faults, in comparison of those that are more finished and regular, as upon an ancient majestick piece of Gothick architecture, compared with a neat modern building: the latter is more elegant and glaring, but the former is more strong and more solemn . . Nor does the whole fail to strike us with greater reverence, though many of the parts are childish, ill-placed, and unequal to its grandeur." Preface to Pope's edition of Shakespeare's works

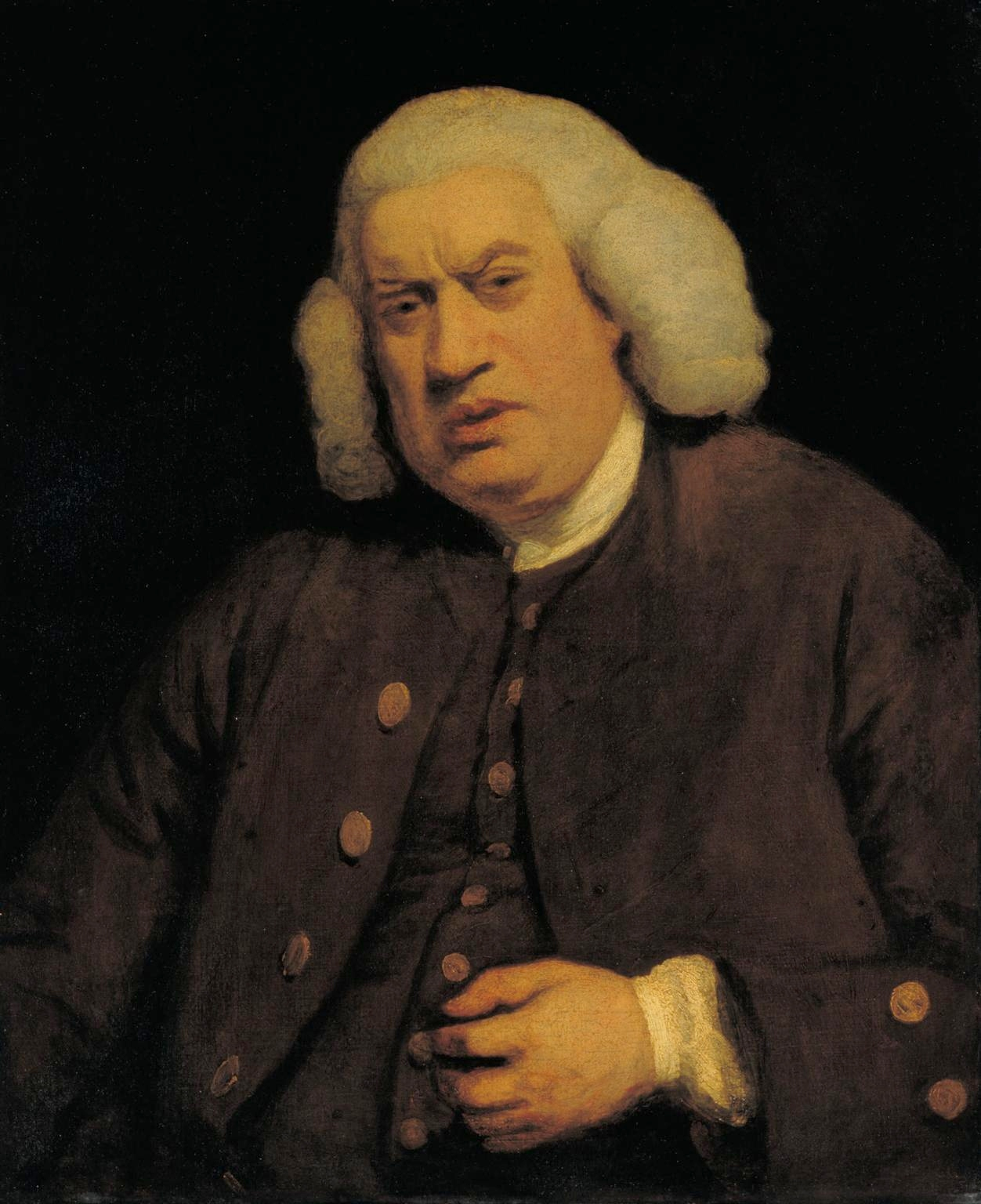
Samuel Johnson, 1775: "The form, the characters, the language, and the shows of the English drama are his."

Voltaire, 1733 Letters concerning the English nation: He created theatre. He had a genius full of strength and fertility, natural and without any spark of good taste and any knowledge of the rules. I'll tell you something hazardous but true: the merit of this author has lost the English theatre; there are such beautiful scenes, such great and at the same time so terrible pieces widespread in his monstrous farces which go by the name of tragedies; these plays have always been performed with great success. The Time, which alone makes the reputation of men, at the end made their faults respectable. The most gigantic and bizarre ideas of this author have earned, after two hundred years, the right to be considered sublime.

Samuel Johnson, 1765 The Plays of William Shakespeare: "[Shakespeare's] adherence to general nature has exposed him to the censure of criticks, who form their judgments upon narrower principles. Dennis and Rymer think his Romans not sufficiently Roman; and Voltaire censures his kings as not completely royal. ... These are the petty cavils of petty minds."
"That it [mixing tragedy and comedy] is a practice contrary to the rules of criticism will be readily allowed; but there is always an appeal open from criticism to nature."
"To the unities of time and place he has shewn no regard, and perhaps a nearer view of the principles on which they stand will diminish their value, and withdraw from them the veneration which, from the time of Corneille, they have very generally received by discovering that they have given more trouble to the poet, than pleasure to the auditor."
"Perhaps it would not be easy to find any author, except Homer, who invented so much as Shakespeare, who so much advanced the studies which he cultivated, or effused so much novelty upon his age or country. The form, the characters, the language, and the shows of the English drama are his."
"The work of a correct and regular writer is a garden accurately formed and diligently planted, varied with shades, and scented with flowers; the composition of Shakespeare is a forest, in which oaks extend their branches, and pines tower in the air, interspersed sometimes with weeds and brambles, and sometimes giving shelter to myrtles and to roses; filling the eye with awful pomp, and gratifying the mind with endless diversity. Other poets display cabinets of precious rarities, minutely finished, wrought into shape, and polished unto brightness. Shakespeare opens a mine which contains gold and diamonds in unexhaustible plenty, though clouded by incrustations, debased by impurities, and mingled with a mass of meaner minerals."

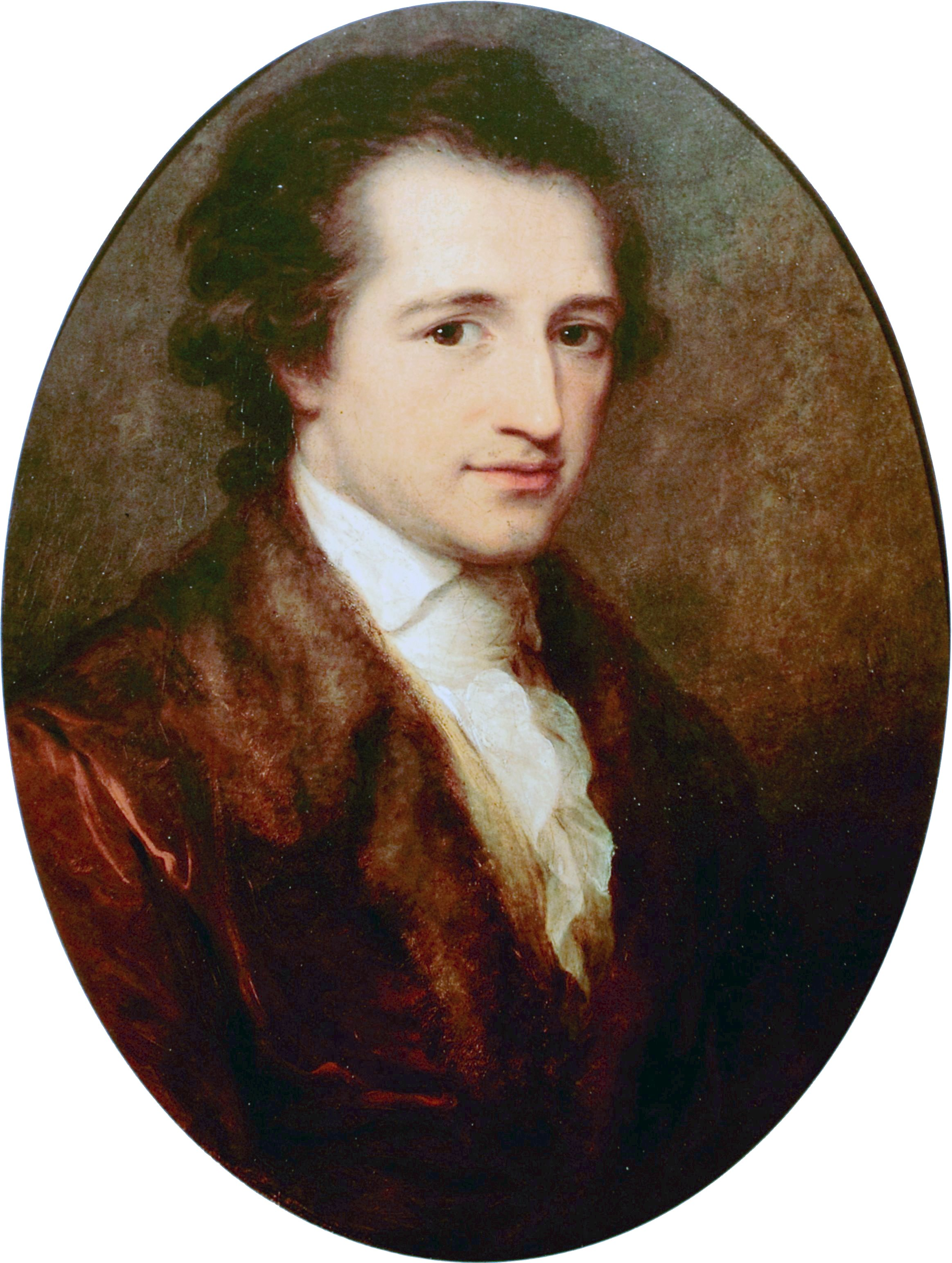
Goethe: "There is no pleasure greater and purer than, with eyes closed, accompany a Shakespeare's play, not declaimed, but recited by a safe and natural voice."

Johann Wolfgang Goethe, 1795–1796 Wilhelm Meister's Apprenticeship (book IV, chap. 3 and 13): "Prince Hamlet is suddenly facing the need for a great action imposed upon your soul that is unable to do it." / "He [the character] is a beautiful being that succumbs under the load he can't distance itself without it."

J. W. Goethe, Writings on literature: "Much has been said about Shakespeare that does not seem anything left to say, but the spirit has features to stimulate the spirit forever..."
"Shakespeare make effect with vitality of the word, and this is what becomes apparent in reading aloud, when the listener is distracted, not by a flawed or right presentation. There is no pleasure greater and purer than, with closed eyes, accompanied a Shakespeare's play, not declaimed, but recited by a safe and natural voice. Follow up the wires with it simple plot developments. For the description of the characters we can to imagine certain pictures, but we must, indeed, through a series of words and speeches, to experiment what is happening internally, and here all who are part of the story seem to have combined not leave anything obscure or in doubt."
"Shakespeare meets with the spirit of the world. He enters the world as it is spirit. For both, nothing is hidden; but as the work of the spirit of the world is to store mysteries before the action, or even after, the meaning of the poet is going to reveal the mystery, making us confident before the action, or just in run it."
"Shakespeare stands out singularly, linking the old and new in a lush. Wish and duty trying to put itself in balance in his plays; both are faced with violence, but always so that the wish is at a disadvantage."
"Perhaps no one has made so great as the first major link of wish and duty in the individual character as Shakespeare did."

== 19th century ==
Charles Lamb, 1811: "We talk of Shakespeare's admirable observation of life, when we should feel, that not from a petty inquisition into those cheap and every-day characters which surrounded him, as they surround us, but from his own mind, which was, to borrow a phrase of Ben Jonson's, the very 'sphere of humanity' he fetched those images of virtue and of knowledge, of which every one of us recognizing a part, think we comprehend in our natures the whole; and often mistake the powers which he positively creates in us, for nothing more than indigenous faculties of our own minds, which only waited the application of corresponding virtues in him to return a full and clear echo of the same." On the Tragedies of Shakespeare

Thomas de Quincey, 1823: "O, mighty poet! Thy works are not as those of other men, simply and merely great works of art; but are also like the phenomena of nature, like the sun and the sea, the stars and the flowers,—like frost and snow, rain and dew, hail-storm and thunder, which are to be studied with entire submission of our own faculties, and in the perfect faith that in them there can be no too much or too little, nothing useless or inert—but that, the further we press in our discoveries, the more we shall see proofs of design and self-supporting arrangement where the careless eye had seen nothing but accident!" "On the Knocking at the Gate in Macbeth".

Thomas Carlyle, 1841: "Nay, apart from spiritualities; and considering him merely as a real, marketable, tangibly useful possession. England, before long, this Island of ours, will hold but a small fraction of the English: in America, in New Holland, east and west to the very Antipodes, there will be a Saxondom covering great spaces of the Globe. And now, what is it that can keep all these together into virtually one Nation, so that they do not fall out and fight, but live at peace, in brotherlike intercourse, helping one another? This is justly regarded as the greatest practical problem, the thing all manner of sovereignties and governments are here to accomplish: what is it that will accomplish this? Acts of Parliament, administrative prime-ministers cannot. America is parted from us, so far as Parliament could part it. Call it not fantastic, for there is much reality in it: Here, I say, is an English King, whom no time or chance, Parliament or combination of Parliaments, can dethrone! This King Shakespeare, does not he shine, in crowned sovereignty, over us all, as the noblest, gentlest, yet strongest of rallying-signs; indestructible; really more valuable in that point of view than any other means or appliance whatsoever? We can fancy him as radiant aloft over all the Nations of Englishmen, a thousand years hence. From Paramatta, from New York, wheresoever, under what sort of Parish-Constable soever, English men and women are, they will say to one another: 'Yes, this Shakespeare is ours; we produced him, we speak and think by him; we are of one blood and kind with him.'" On Heroes, Hero-Worship, and the Heroic in History

Victor Hugo, 1859: "Two exiles, father and son, are on a desert island serving a long sentence. In a morning, sitting in front of the house, the young man asks: 'What do you think of this exile?' 'It will be long... ", replied the father. 'And how occupy it?', continues the young son. The old serene man reply: 'I will look the ocean, and you?' It is a long silence before the son's answer: 'I will translate Shakespeare.' Shekespeare: the ocean."

== 20th century ==
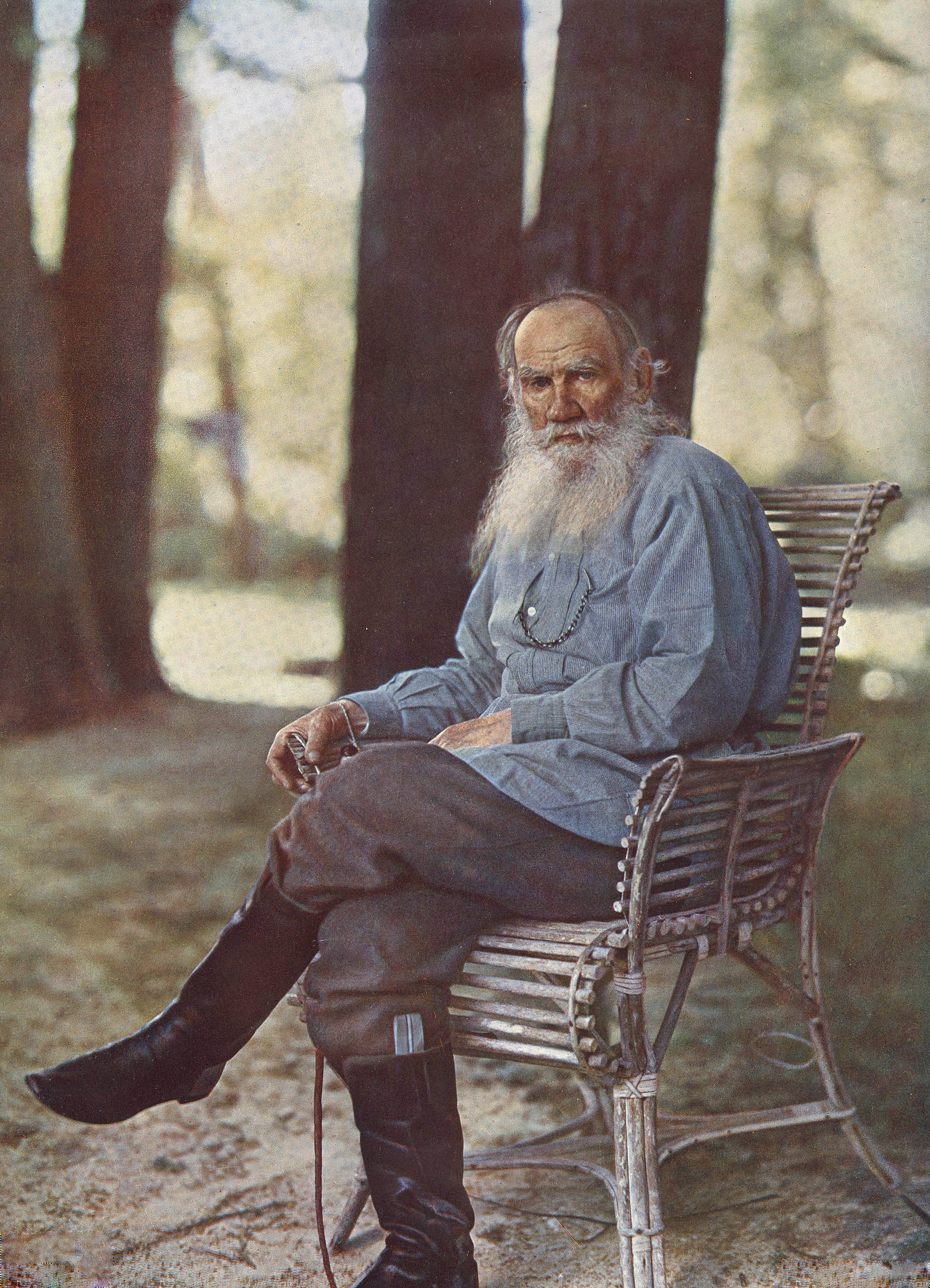
Leo Tolstoy, 1906: ", but having read, one after the other, works regarded as his best, ...not only did I feel no delight, but I felt an irresistible repulsion and tedium."

Leo Tolstoy, 1906: "I remember the astonishment I felt when I first read Shakespeare. I expected to receive a powerful aesthetic pleasure, but having read, one after the other, works regarded as his best: "King Lear," "Romeo and Juliet," "Hamlet" and "Macbeth," not only did I feel no delight, but I felt an irresistible repulsion and tedium... Several times I read the dramas and the comedies and historical plays, and I invariably underwent the same feelings: repulsion, weariness, and bewilderment. At the present time, before writing this preface, being desirous once more to test myself, I have, as an old man of seventy-five, again read the whole of Shakespeare, including the historical plays, the "Henrys," "Troilus and Cressida," "The Tempest", "Cymbeline", and I have felt, with even greater force, the same feelings,—this time, however, not of bewilderment, but of firm, indubitable conviction that the unquestionable glory of a great genius which Shakespeare enjoys, and which compels writers of our time to imitate him and readers and spectators to discover in him non-existent merits,—thereby distorting their aesthetic and ethical understanding,—is a great evil, as is every untruth." Tolstoy on Shakespeare.

D. H. Lawrence, 1928:

"When I read Shakespeare I am struck with wonder
that such trivial people should muse and thunder
in such lovely language
. . .
How boring, how small Shakespeare's people are!
Yet the language so lovely! like the dyes from gas-tar."

"When I Read Shakespeare" in The Complete Poems of D. H. Lawrence.

Sigmund Freud, 1930: "Incidentally, in the meantime, I ceased to believe that the author of Shakespeare's works was the man of Stratford." (Freud supported the theory that the works attributed to Shakespeare were written by Edward de Vere, the Earl of Oxford, and that this discovery enabled better interpretation of his sonnets) (Outline of Psychoanalysis, 1940/1987: 220). Note added in The Interpretation of Dreams (1900) – Freud, 1900/1987: 260

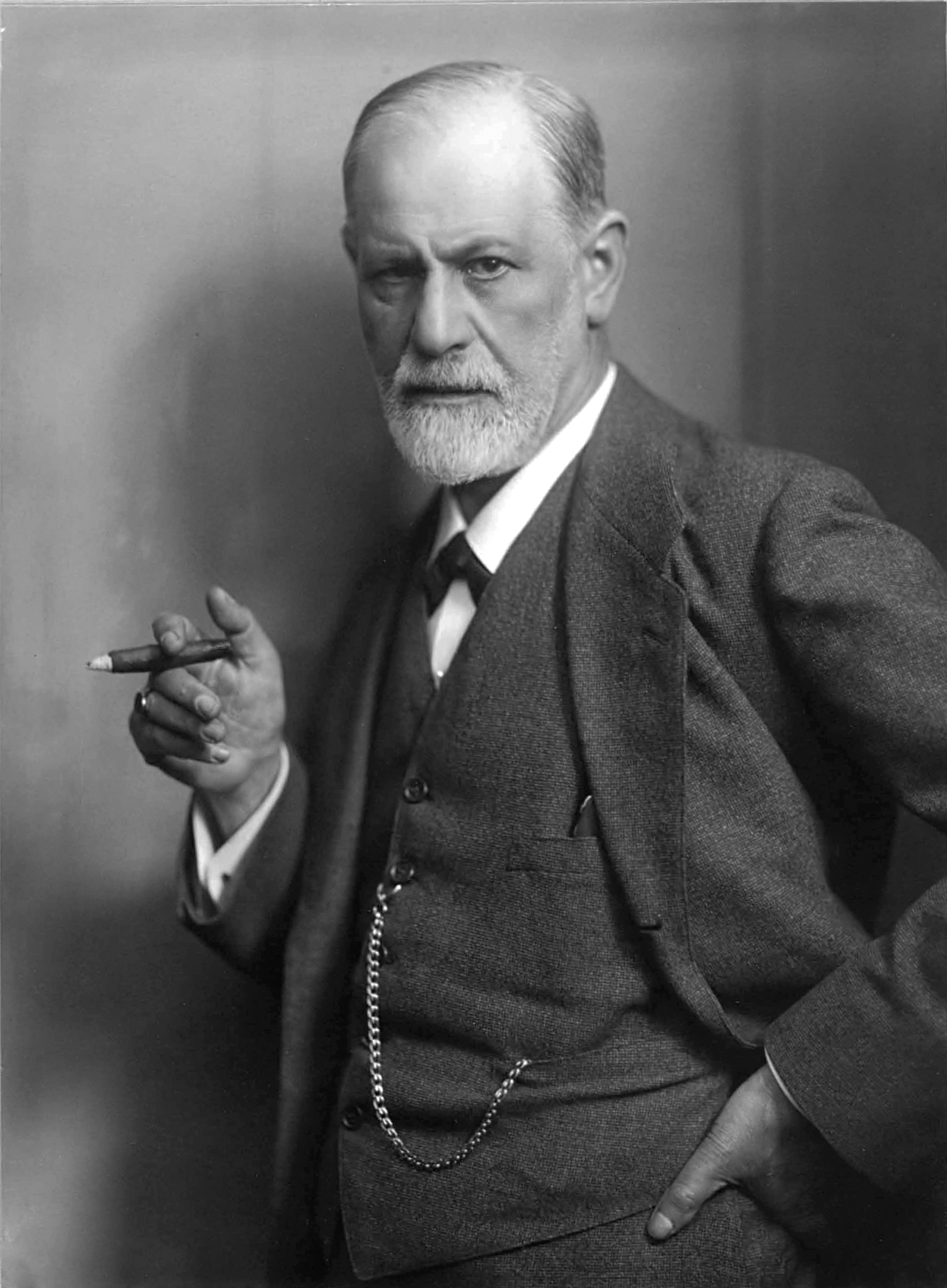
Sigmund Freud, 1930: "I stopped to believe that the author of Shakespeare's works was the man of Stratford."

Freud, 1939: "It is well known that the genius is incomprehensible and irresponsible; so we should bring it to the dance as a full explanation to what the other solution has failed. The same consideration applies also to the remarkable case of William Shakespeare of Stratford." Moses and Monotheism, 1939/1987: 83

W. H. Auden, 1947: "There is a continual process of simplification in Shakespeare's plays. What is he up to? He is holding the mirror up to nature. In the early minor sonnets he talks about his works outlasting time. But increasingly he suggests, as Theseus does in A Midsummer Night's Dream, that "The best in this kind are but shadows" (V.i.214), that art is rather a bore. ... I find Shakespeare particularly appealing in his attitude towards his work. There's something a little irritating in the determination of the very greatest artists, like Dante, Joyce, Milton, to create masterpieces and to think themselves important. To be able to devote one's life to art without forgetting that art is frivolous is a tremendous achievement of personal character. Shakespeare never takes himself too seriously." Lectures on Shakespeare (ed. by Arthur Kirsch)

T. S. Eliot: "Dante and Shakespeare divide the modern world between them, there is no third." Dante, 1929

T. S. Eliot, 1922: "We must simply admit that here Shakespeare tackled a problem which proved too much for him. Why he attempted it at all is an insoluble puzzle; under compulsion of what experience he attempted to express the inexpressibly horrible, we cannot ever know. We need a great many facts in his biography; and we should like to know whether, and when, and after or at the same time as what personal experience, he read Montaigne, II. xii., Apologie de Raimond Sebond. We should have, finally, to know something which is by hypothesis unknowable, for we assume it to be an experience which, in the manner indicated, exceeded the facts. We should have to understand things which Shakespeare did not understand himself." Hamlet and His Problems, in The Sacred Wood: Essays on Poetry and Criticism.

Otto Maria Carpeaux: "The greatest poet of modern times and—except for the limitations of our critical judgement—of all time."

Allan Bloom, 1964: "Shakespeare devotes great care to establishing the political setting in almost all his plays, and his greatest heroes are rulers who exercise capacities which can only be exercised within civil society. To neglect this is simply to be blinded by the brilliance of one's own prejudices. As soon as one sees this, one cannot help asking what Shakespeare thought about a good regime and a good ruler." on his Shakespeare's Politics (with Harry V. Jaffa).

Kenneth Burke: "Shakespeare found many ingenious ways to make it seem that his greatest plays unfolded of themselves, like a destiny rather than by a technical expert’s scheming. . . . He spontaneously knew how to translate some typical tension or conflict of his society into terms of variously interrelated personalities—and his function as a dramatist was to let that whole complexity act itself out, by endowing each personality with the appropriate ideas, images, attitudes, actions, situations, relationships, and fatality. The true essence of his “beliefs” was thus embodied in the vision of that complexity itself. . . . Perhaps in this sense Shakespeare never wrote the ideal Shakespearean play; but again and again he came close to it. . . . he was the sort of craftsman who, if we believed such-and-such, could make a great play out of such beliefs, and could as easily have made a great play out of the opposite beliefs, if those others were what moved us. For what he believed in above all was the glory of his trade itself, which is to say, the great humaneness of the word . . . so masterfully embodied in Shakespeare’s blithe dramaturgic schemings." Kenneth Burke on Shakespeare

Stephen Booth, 1994: "A good metaphor for ... the action of casual, incidental relationships among words and ideas in Shakespeare is patina. Networks of nonsensical relationship act upon speeches and plays the way a patina does upon artwork in metal. They smooth across seams and deny them without obliterating them. Grosser examples of the effect have been noted in literature ever since people started analyzing double plots and noticing echoing situations and spotting thematic common denominators and sustained patterns of imagery." Close Reading Without Readings

Harold Bloom, 1994: "...Shakespeare is the Canon. He sets the standard and the limits of literature." The Western Canon

== 21st century ==
Stanley Wells, 2016: "His plays give us the greatest sense of the value of human life; of how people live; of how people love and of the importance of human relationships than any other writers of his time or of any other time. Shakespeare’s plays are as popular as they are because he was perhaps the greatest writer who has ever lived."
