= A. C. Bradley =

English literary scholar (1851–1935)

A. C. Bradley FBA
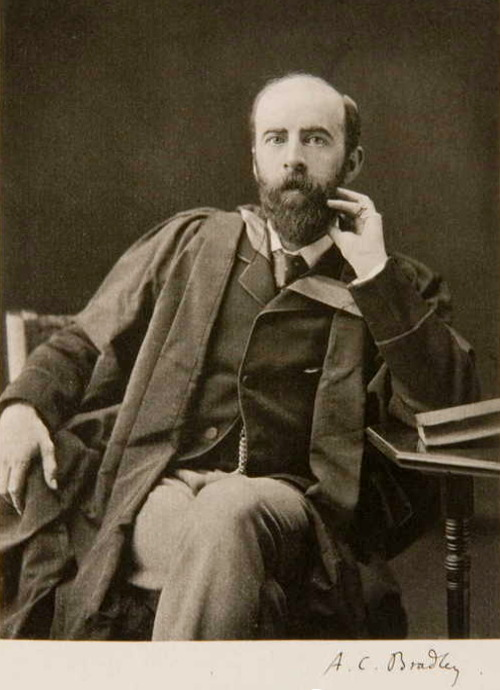
- Bradley in 1891
- Born: Andrew Cecil Bradley; 26 March 1851; Clapham, Surrey, England
- Died: 2 September 1935 (aged 84); Kensington, London, England
- Education: Balliol College, Oxford
- Parents: Charles Bradley; Emma Linton
- Family: George Granville Bradley (brother); Francis Herbert Bradley (brother)

Andrew Cecil Bradley, FBA (26 March 1851 – 2 September 1935) was an English literary scholar, best remembered for his work on Shakespeare.

== Life ==
Bradley was born at Park Hill, Clapham, then in Surrey but now part of London. He was the son of Charles Bradley (1789–1871), vicar of Glasbury, the youngest of nine children by his second wife Emma Linton; the philosopher Francis Herbert Bradley (1846–1924), was the fifth child.

Bradley studied at Balliol College, Oxford. He obtained a Balliol Fellowship in 1874 and lectured first in English and subsequently in philosophy until 1881. He then took a permanent position at the University of Liverpool where he lectured on literature. In 1889 he moved to Glasgow as Regius Professor. In 1901 he was elected to the Oxford professorship of poetry. During his five years in this post he produced Shakespearean Tragedy (1904) and Oxford Lectures on Poetry (1909). He was later made an honorary fellow of Balliol and was awarded honorary doctorates from Liverpool, Glasgow, Edinburgh (1899), and Durham, and was offered (but declined) the King Edward VII chair at Cambridge. Bradley never married; he lived in London with his sister and died at 6 Holland Park Road, Kensington, London, on 2 September 1935. His will established a research fellowship for young scholars of English Letters.

== Work ==
The outcome of his five years as professor of poetry at the University of Oxford were Bradley's two major works, Shakespearean Tragedy (1904), and Oxford Lectures on Poetry (1909). All his published work was originally delivered in the form of lectures. Bradley's pedagogical manner and his self-confidence made him a real guide for many students to the meaning of Shakespeare. His influence on Shakespearean criticism was so great that the following poem by Guy Boas, "Lays of Learning", appeared in 1926:

I dreamt last night that Shakespeare’s Ghost
Sat for a civil service post.
The English paper for that year
Had several questions on King Lear
Which Shakespeare answered very badly
Because he hadn’t read his Bradley.

(Hawkes 1986 as cited in Taylor 2001: 46)

Though Bradley has sometimes been criticised for writing of Shakespeare's characters as though they were real people, his book is probably the most influential single work of Shakespearean criticism ever published.

== Reputation ==
Shakespearean Tragedy has been reprinted more than two dozen times and is itself the subject of a scholarly book, Katherine Cooke's A. C. Bradley and His Influence in Twentieth-Century Shakespeare Criticism. By the mid-twentieth century his approach became discredited for many scholars; often it is said to contain anachronistic errors and attempts to apply late 19th century novelistic conceptions of morality and psychology to early 17th century society. Kenneth Burke's 1951 article "Othello: An Essay to Illustrate a Method" counters a Bradleyan reading of character, as L. C. Knights had earlier done with his 1933 essay "How Many Children Had Lady Macbeth?" (John Britton has pointed out that this was never a question actually posed by Bradley, and apparently was made up by F. R. Leavis as a mockery of "current irrelevancies in Shakespeare criticism.") Since the 1970s, the prevalence of poststructuralist methods of criticism resulted in students turning away from his work, although a number of scholars have recently returned to considering "character" as a historical category of evaluation (for instance, Michael Bristol). Harold Bloom paid tribute to Bradley's place in the tradition of critical writing on Shakespeare: "This [Bloom's] book – Shakespeare: the Invention of the Human – is a latecomer work, written in the wake of the Shakespeare critics I most admire: Johnson, Hazlitt, Bradley."

Bradley delivered the 1907–1908 Gifford Lecture at the University of Glasgow, entitled "Ideals of Religion". He also delivered the 1909 Adamson Lecture of the Victoria University of Manchester and the 1912 Shakespeare Lecture of the British Academy. Bradley's other works include "Aristotle's Conception of the State" in Hellenica (ed. Evelyn Abbott, London : Longmans, Green, 1st ed. 1880, 2nd ed., 1898), Poetry for Poetry's Sake (1901), A Commentary on Tennyson's in Memoriam (1901), and A Miscellany (1929).

== See also ==
- Timeline of Shakespeare criticism

== Sources ==
- New General Catalog of Old Books and Authors

Academic offices
Preceded by John Nichol	Regius Professor of English Language and Literature, University of Glasgow; 1889–1900	Succeeded by Sir Walter Raleigh
Preceded by William Courthope	Oxford Professor of Poetry; 1901–1906	Succeeded by John William Mackail
