= Charles Bradley (preacher) =

English Anglican priest (1789–1871)

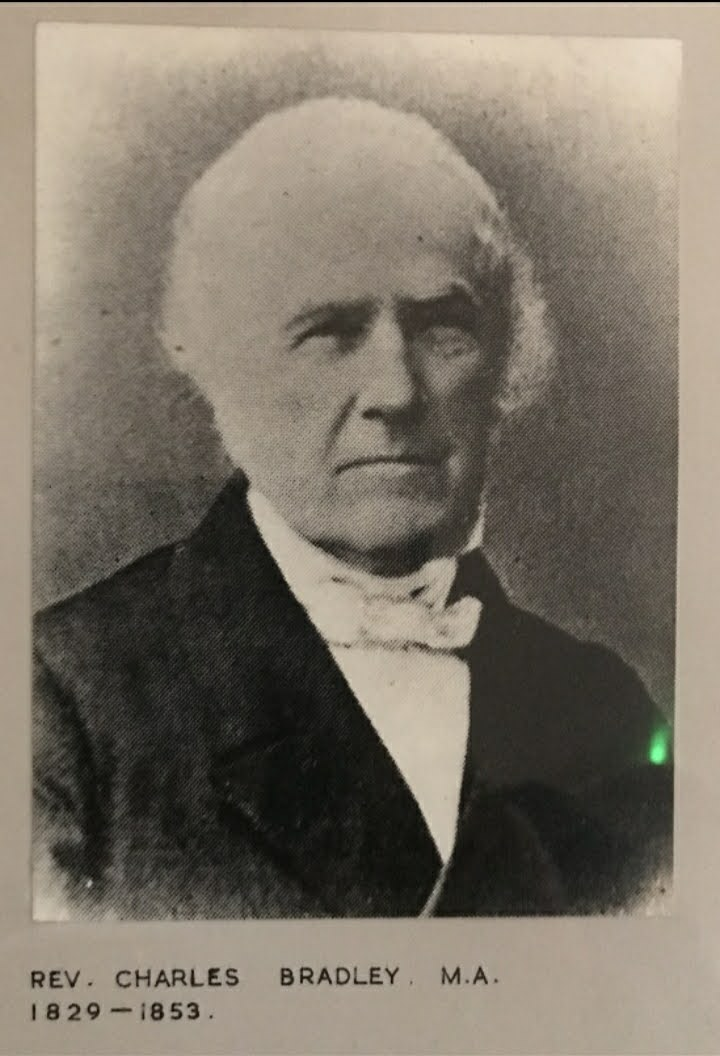
Photograph held at St James Church Clapham

Charles Bradley (1789–1871) was an English Anglican priest who was eminent as a preacher and writer of sermons published between 1818 and 1853.

== Early life ==
Bradley belonged to the evangelical school of the Church of England. He was born in Halstead, Essex, on 22 February 1789. His parents, Thomas and Ann Bradley, were both of Yorkshire origin, but settled in Wallingford, Berkshire, where Charles, the elder of two sons, passed much of his early life.

In 1809, Bradley took pupils and edited school books. His book Grammatical questions was published, "adapted to the grammar of Lindley Murray". That year, also, he was awarded an M.A. degree by King's College, Aberdeen, as "Master of the Foundation School at Wallingford, Berks, and author of a work on English Grammar", certified by William Mairis, Rector of St Peter's Church, Wallingford, and William Hazil [sic], former Fellow of Pembroke College, Oxford.

Bradley was, for a time after his marriage, a student at St Edmund Hall, Oxford, where he matriculated in 1810.

== Curate ==
Bradley was ordained deacon in 1812 by John Randolph, without proceeding to a degree, to the parish of Wallingford, where the rector was Edward Barry. In 1818 he was ordained priest by George Pretyman Tomline and became curate of High Wycombe.

At High Wycombe Bradley combined the work of a private tutor with the sole charge of the parish. Among his pupils were William Smith O'Brien, Bonamy Price and Philip Jacob. His powers as a preacher soon attracted attention. He formed the acquaintance of William Wilberforce, Thomas Scott, the commentator, Daniel Wilson, and others.

== Vicar and preacher ==
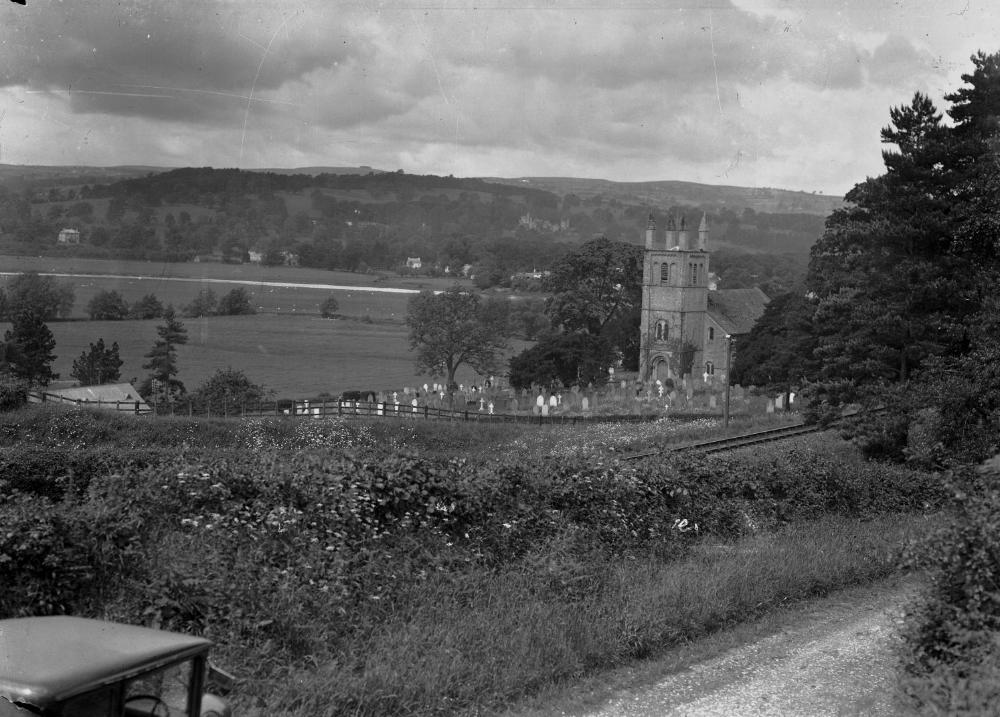
St Peter's Church, Glasbury, photograph about 1910

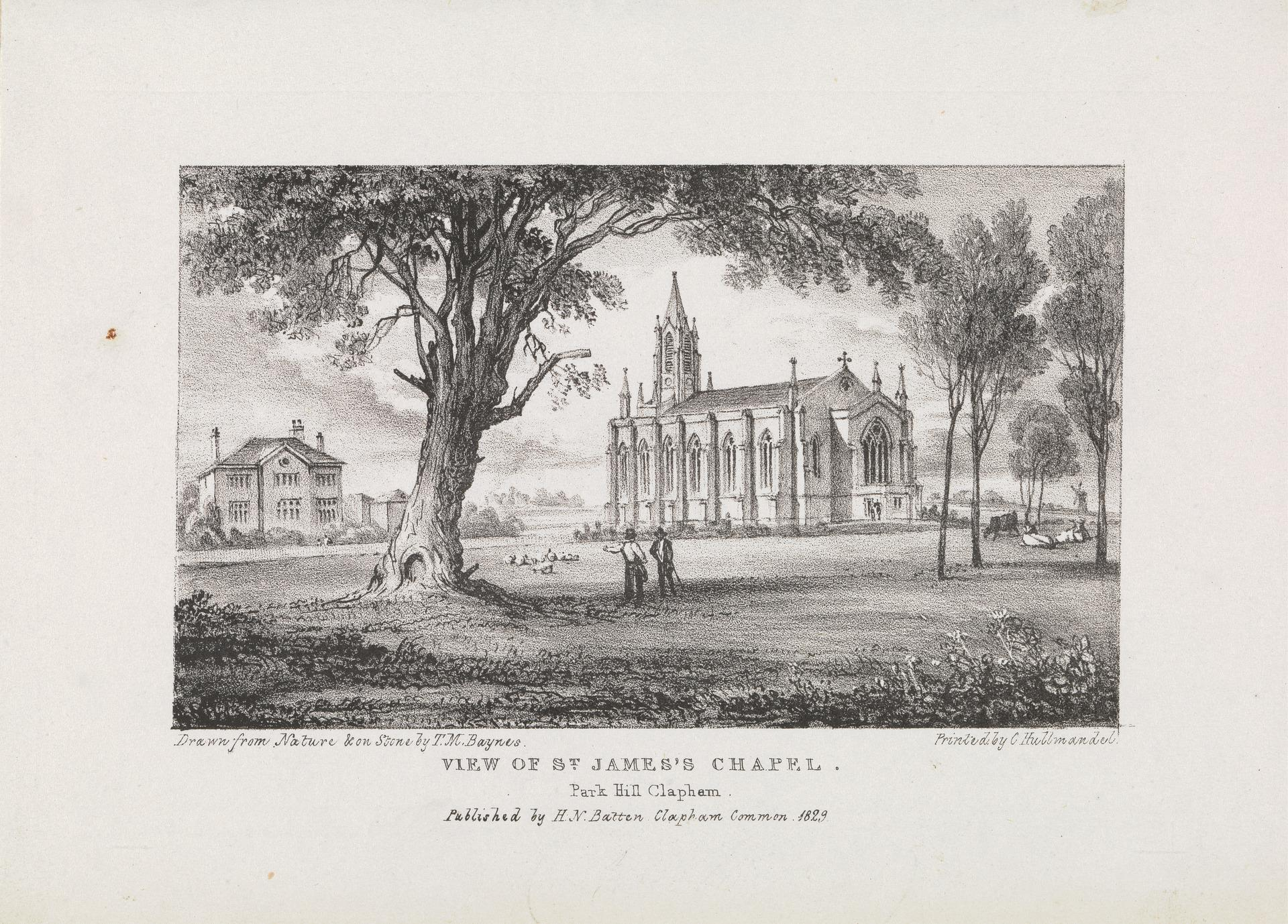
St James's Chapel, Clapham, 1829 lithograph

In the year 1823 Bradley was presented by Henry Ryder, Bishop of St. Davids, to the vicarage of Glasbury in Brecknockshire. He retained the living of Glasbury till his death, but in the year 1829 he became also the first incumbent of St James's Chapel at Clapham in Surrey (now in Greater London). He resided there, with some periods of absence, till 1852.

The Glasbury church was rebuilt 1836–7 by Lewis Vulliamy. William Herbert had been curate there from 1826; in 1836 he moved on to the Rhydybrew chapelry in Llywel parish as a perpetual curate.

James Francis Cobb was taken when young to hear Bradley preach in St James's Chapel. He wrote much later, in 1882, "I remember perfectly his manner and appearance; the pleasant, kindly face, with the iron-grey hair and whiskers, the attractive style, the clear voice, the loving, earnest way of applying his subject, which was always divided and subdivided". In terms of homiletics, George Jennings Davies in 1884 called Bradley "one of the greatest masters of divisions".

== Works ==
Bradley's Sermons Preached in the Parish Church of High Wycombe (1818) was dedicated to Lord Liverpool. It ran to two volumes, and an 11th edition in 1854. A volume of sermons at Glasbury was published in 1825, which reached a ninth edition in 1854; another volume of sermons was published in 1831, followed by two volumes of Practical Sermons in 1836 and 1838, by Sacramental Sermons in 1842, and Sermons on the Christian Life in 1853. These works circulated widely, and the sermons were preached by others. A volume of selections was published in 1884.

== Personal life ==
Bradley was twice married, and the father of 22 children. He married, firstly in 1809, Catherine Shepherd of Yattenden (died 1831). They had thirteen children, of whom twelve survived him. By his second marriage in 1840 with Emma Linton, daughter of John Linton, he had nine children.

Of the six sons by the first marriage, the eldest of six sons was the educator Rev. Charles Bradley of Southgate, and the fourth was George Granville Bradley. F. H. Bradley was the fifth child, and A. C. Bradley the youngest, of the second marriage. Of the daughters, Harriet Bradley (died 1914) married George Grove.

Bradley spent the last period of his life at Cheltenham, where he died on 16 August 1871, aged 82.
