= Walter Raleigh (professor) =

British academic

Sir Walter Alexander Raleigh
- Born: 5 September 1861; London, England
- Died: 13 May 1922 (aged 60); Oxford, England
- Occupations: Scholar, poet, author
- Known for: First holder of the Chair of English Literature at Oxford
- Children: 5
- Awards: Knight Bachelor (1911)

Academic background
- Education: University College London; King's College, Cambridge

Academic work
- Discipline: English Literature
- Institutions: Mohammedan Anglo-Oriental College; University College Liverpool; Glasgow University; Oxford University; Merton College, Oxford

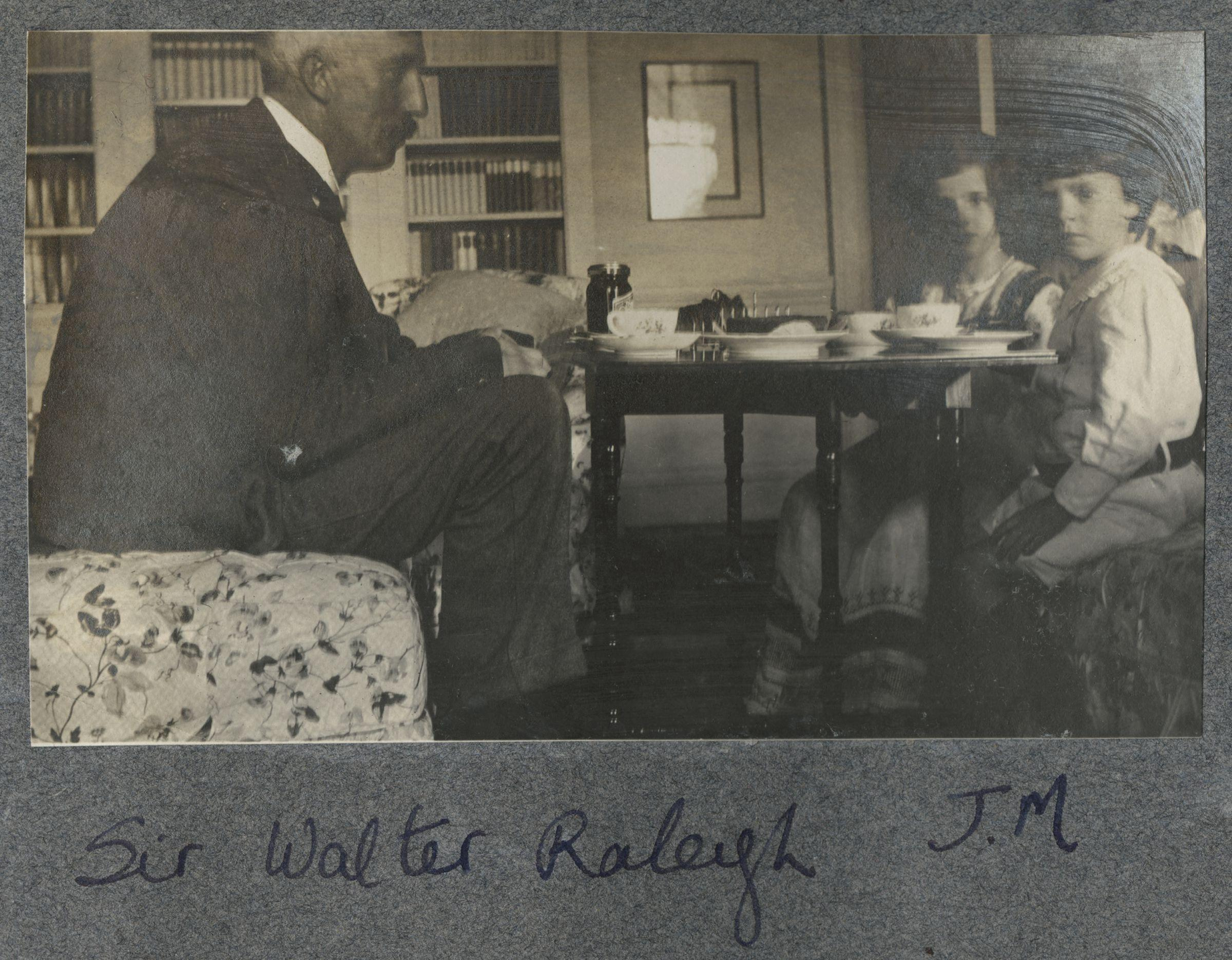
Sir Walter Alexander Raleigh (left), Julian Ottoline Vinogradoff and an unknown boy, photographed by Lady Ottoline Morrell

Sir Walter Alexander Raleigh (/ˈrɔːli, ˈrɑː-/; 5 September 1861 – 13 May 1922) was an English scholar, poet, and author.

== Biography ==
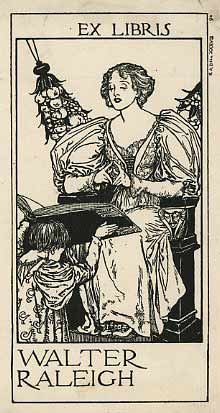
Bookplate designed by Robert Anning Bell

Walter Alexander Raleigh was born in London, the fifth child and only son of Alexander Raleigh, a Congregationalist minister, and Mary (née Gifford). Katherine Raleigh was a sister and Lord Gifford was an uncle. Raleigh was educated at the City of London School, Edinburgh Academy, University College London, and King's College, Cambridge. He was a member of the Cambridge Apostles and President of the Cambridge Union in 1884.

He was Professor of English Literature at the Mohammedan Anglo-Oriental College in Aligarh in India (1885–87), Professor of Modern Literature at the University College Liverpool (1890–1900), Regius Professor of English Language and Literature at Glasgow University (1900–1904), and in 1904 became the first holder of the Chair of English Literature at Oxford University and he was a fellow of Merton College, Oxford (1914–22). Raleigh was knighted in 1911. Among his works are Style (1897), Milton (1900) and Shakespeare (1907), but in his day he was more renowned as a stimulating if informal lecturer than as a critic.

On the outbreak of World War I, he turned to the war as his primary subject. Raleigh's correspondence during the war revealed strong Anti-German sentiment; one letter stated "German University Culture is mere evil", and added that the deaths "of 100 Boche professors ... would be a benefit to the human race". His finest book may be the first volume of The War in the Air (1922), whose volumes II to VI (1928–1937, plus 3 volumes of maps) had to be compiled by Henry Albert Jones after Raleigh's death.

In 1915, he delivered the Vanuxem lectures at Princeton on "The Origins of Romance" and "The Beginnings of the Romantic Revival," and lectured on Chaucer at Brown University, which gave him the degree of Litt.D.

Raleigh died at the Acland Nursing Home, Oxford, from typhoid (contracted during a visit to the Near East) on 13 May 1922 (aged 60), being survived by his wife, Lucie Gertrude Jackson (sister-in-law of Catherine Carswell), three of their four sons, and a daughter. His daughter Philippa married the writer Charles Whibley. He is buried in the churchyard of the St Lawrence's Church at North Hinksey, near Oxford.

His son Hilary edited his light prose, verse and plays in Laughter from a Cloud (1923). Raleigh is probably best known for the poem "Wishes of an Elderly Man, Wished at a Garden Party, June 1914":

I wish I loved the Human Race;
I wish I loved its silly face;
I wish I liked the way it walks;
I wish I liked the way it talks;
And when I'm introduced to one
I wish I thought What Jolly Fun!

Raleigh Park at North Hinksey, near Harcourt Hill where he lived from 1909 to his death, is named after him. The Department of English at Aligarh Muslim University has an active Raleigh Literary Society, which regularly organises performances of scenes from Shakespeare's plays.

== Bibliography ==
Anthumous

- The English Novel (1894)
- Robert Louis Stevenson: An Essay (1895); 2nd edition, 1896
- Style (1897)
- Milton (1900); 1905 reprint
- Wordsworth (1903)
- The English Voyagers (1904)
- Shakespeare (1907)
- Samuel Johnson: the Leslie Stephen lecture delivered in the Senate House Cambridge 22 February 1907, Oxford: Clarendon Press, 1907, Wikidata Q107337202
- Six Essays on Johnson (1910)
- Early English Voyages of the 16th Century (1910)
- Shakespeare's England : an account of the life & manners of his age (1916, with Sir Sidney Lee)
- "Shakespeare and England". Proceedings of the British Academy, 1917–1918. 8: 403–418. Annual Shakespeare Lecture of the British Academy (1918)
- The War in the Air: being the story of the part played in the Great War by the Royal Air Force, Volume I: "Air operations of the 1915 Gallipoli campaign; the Western Front in 1915/1916; naval air operations." (1922; revised 1939)

Posthumous

- The Letters of Sir Walter Raleigh 1879–1922 (1926, 2 volumes; 1928, enlarged); reprinted as The Letters of Sir Walter Raleigh 1879 to 1922 (2005, 2-in-1 volume)

Academic offices
Preceded by A. C. Bradley	Regius Professor of English Language and Literature, University of Glasgow; 1900–1904	Succeeded by William Macneile Dixon
Preceded by Chair created	Merton Professor of English Literature, Oxford; 1904–1922	Succeeded by George Stuart Gordon
