= William Macneile Dixon =

British writer and academic

William Macneile Dixon (1866 – 31 January 1946) was a British writer and academic.

== Biography ==
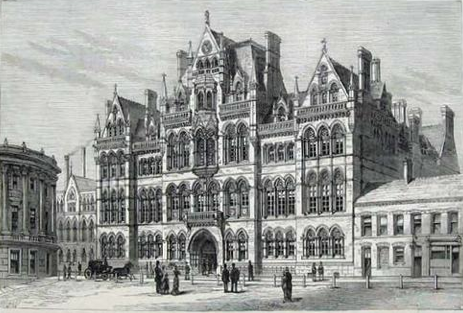
Mason Science College, now the University of Birmingham

Dixon was born in India, the only son of the Reverend William Dixon and attended Methodist College Belfast. He studied at Trinity College Dublin, where he was twice Vice-Chancellor's Prizeman in English verse, Downes' Prizeman, and Elrington Prizeman, and graduated First-Class, with the First Senior Moderatorship, in the Modern Literature School, and Second Class, with the Junior Moderatorship, in the Mental and Moral Science School in 1890. He also took considerable part in the public life of the university: he was President of the University Philosophical Society, auditor of the College Historical Society, and chairman of the students' committee for celebrations of the college's tercentenary. In 1891 he was appointed Professor of English Literature in Alexandra College, Dublin, and was also a Trinity College Dublin Extension Lecturer; and in 1894 he was elected Professor of English Language and Literature in the Mason Science College, afterwards Birmingham University. He was also Professor of Literature to the Royal Birmingham Society of Artists. He was chosen President of the Library Association of the United Kingdom in 1902, and re-elected in 1903. Lastly, on the transference of Professor Walter Raleigh to Oxford, Professor Dixon received the appointment to the Regius Professorship of English Language and Literature at the University of Glasgow from 1904 until 1935. In 1938 he was elected an honorary fellow of Trinity College Dublin.

Besides articles in the Quarterly Review and other periodicals, Professor Dixon's publications included English Poetry from Blake to Browning; A Tennyson Primer; In the Republic of Letters; a monograph on Trinity College Dublin, in the College History Series; and The Human Situation (1937), a collection of his Glasgow Gifford lectures that sold its way into seven editions. His work ranges over a wide field of scientific and philosophical inquiry.

== Personal life ==
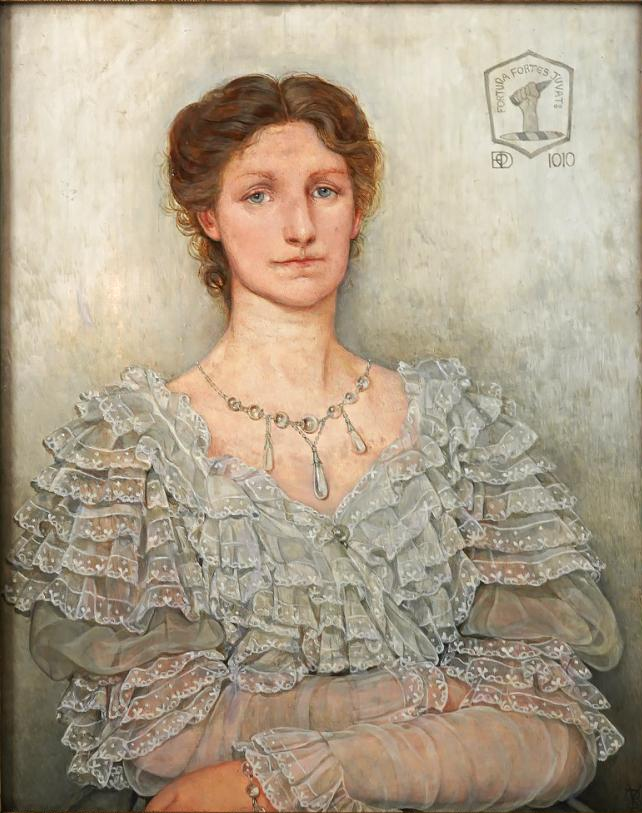
Portrait of Mrs. Macneile Dixon, by Kate Bunce

In 1891 he married Edith Wales, daughter of G. F. Wales, M.D., F.R.C.S.E. A Portrait of Mrs. Macneile Dixon was painted by the Birmingham artist Kate Bunce.

He was a member of the Royal Ulster Yacht Club.

While visiting Edinburgh, Dixon died on 31 January 1946.

Academic offices
Preceded by Sir Walter Raleigh	Regius Professor of English Language and Literature, University of Glasgow; 1904–1935	Succeeded by Peter Alexander
