= Shakespeare's writing style =

Style of the English poet and playwright

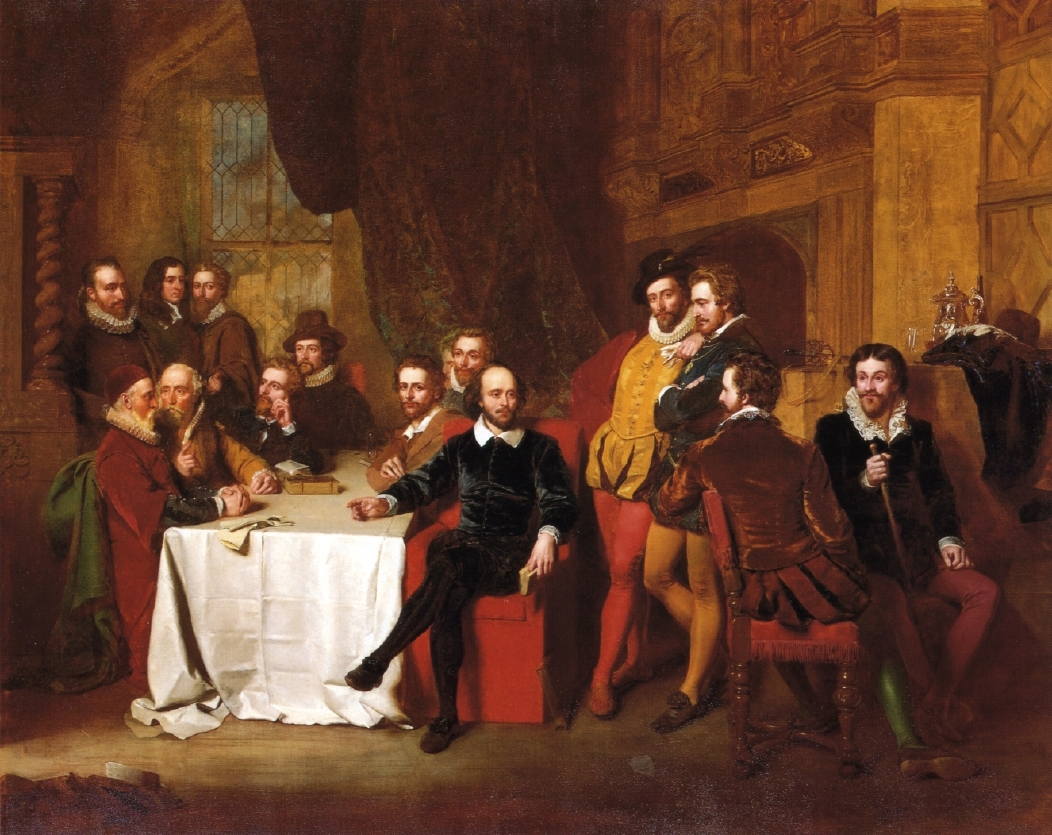
Shakespeare and His Friends at the Mermaid Tavern (1850, oil on canvas) by John Faed. The painting depicts (from left in back) Joshua Sylvester, John Selden, Francis Beaumont, (seated at table from left) William Camden, Thomas Sackville, John Fletcher, Sir Francis Bacon, Ben Jonson, John Donne, Samuel Daniel, Shakespeare, Sir Walter Raleigh, the Earl of Southampton, Sir Robert Cotton, and Thomas Dekker.

William Shakespeare's style of writing was borrowed from the conventions of the day and adapted to his needs.

== Overview ==
William Shakespeare's first plays were written in the conventional style of the day. He wrote them in a stylised language that does not always spring naturally from the needs of the characters or the drama. The poetry depends on extended, elaborate metaphors and conceits, and the language is often rhetorical—written for actors to declaim rather than speak. For example, the grand speeches in Titus Andronicus, in the view of some critics, often hold up the action, while the verse in The Two Gentlemen of Verona has been described as stilted.

Soon, however, William Shakespeare began to adapt the traditional styles to his own purposes. The opening soliloquy of Richard III has its roots in the self-declaration of Vice in medieval drama. At the same time, Richard's vivid self-awareness looks forward to the soliloquies of Shakespeare's mature plays. No single play marks a change from the traditional to the freer style. Shakespeare combined the two throughout his career, with Romeo and Juliet perhaps the best example of the mixing of the styles. By the time of Romeo and Juliet, Richard II, and A Midsummer Night's Dream in the mid-1590s, Shakespeare had begun to write a more natural poetry. He increasingly tuned his metaphors and images to the needs of the drama itself.

Shakespeare's standard poetic form was blank verse, composed in iambic pentameter with clever use of puns and imagery. In practice, this meant that his verse was usually unrhymed and consisted of ten syllables to a line, spoken with a stress on every second syllable. The blank verse of his early plays is quite different from that of his later ones. It is often beautiful, but its sentences tend to start, pause, and finish at the end of lines, with the risk of monotony. Once Shakespeare mastered traditional blank verse, he began to interrupt and vary its flow. This technique releases the new power and flexibility of the poetry in plays such as Julius Caesar and Hamlet. Shakespeare uses it, for example, to convey the turmoil in Hamlet's mind:

Sir, in my heart there was a kind of fighting
That would not let me sleep. Methought I lay
Worse than the mutines in the bilboes. Rashly—
And prais'd be rashness for it—let us know
Our indiscretion sometimes serves us well…

— Prince Hamlet, in William Shakespeare, Hamlet, 5.2.4–8.

After Hamlet, Shakespeare varied his poetic style further, particularly in the more emotional passages of the late tragedies. The literary critic A. C. Bradley described this style as "more concentrated, rapid, varied, and, in construction, less regular, not seldom twisted or elliptical". In the last phase of his career, Shakespeare adopted many techniques to achieve these effects. These included enjambments, irregular pauses and stops, and extreme variations in sentence structure and length. In Macbeth, for example, the language darts from one unrelated metaphor or simile to another in one of Lady Macbeth's well-known speeches:

Was the hope drunk,
Wherein you dress'd yourself? Hath it slept since?
And wakes it now, to look so green and pale
At what it did so freely?

— Lady Macbeth, in William Shakespeare, Macbeth, I.VII.35–8.

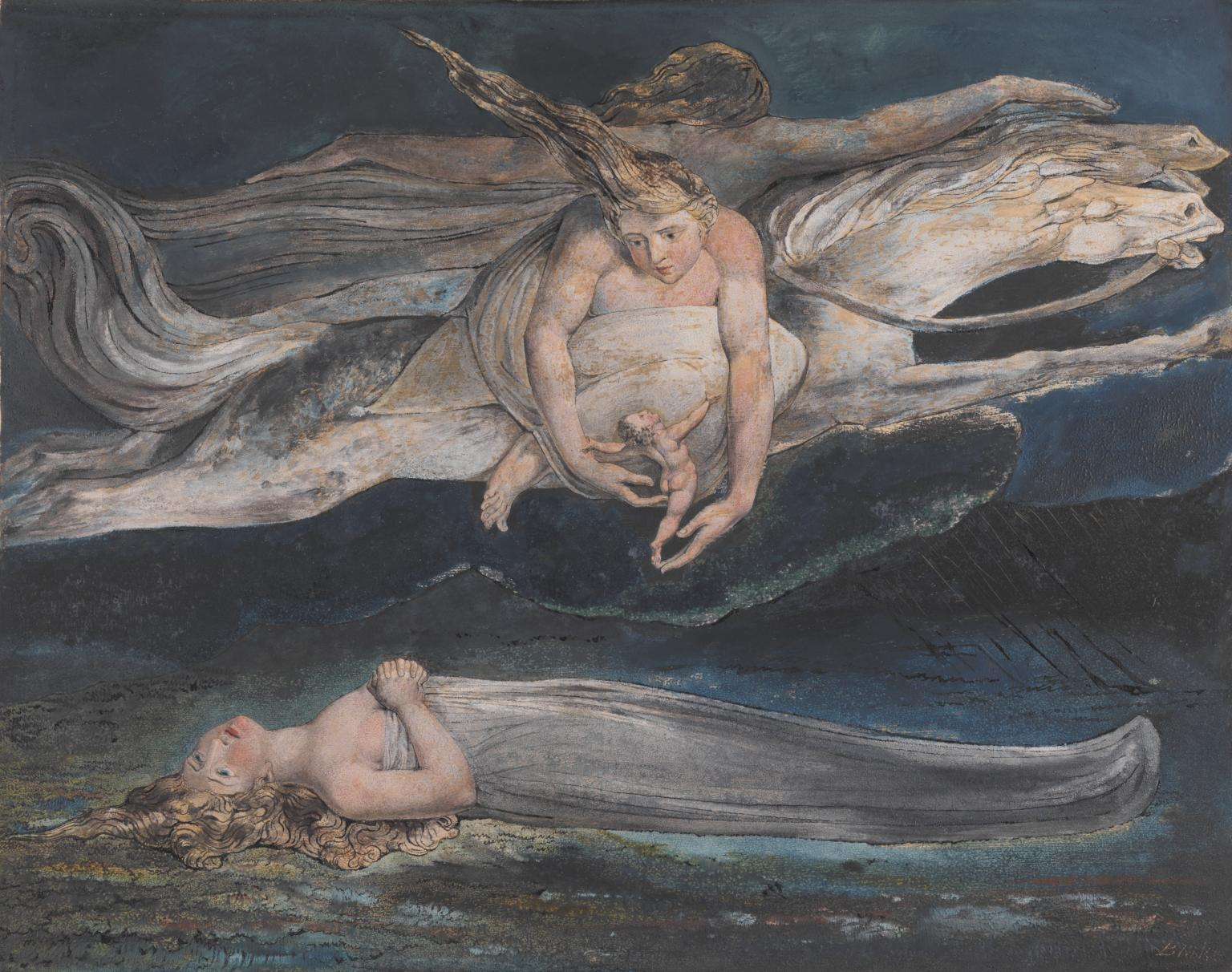
Pity (1795) by William Blake, is an illustration of two similes in Macbeth: "And Pity, like a naked new-born babe, / Striding the blast, or heaven's Cherubins, hors'd / Upon the sightless couriers of the air,".

And in Macbeth's preceding speech:

And Pity, like a naked new-born babe,
Striding the blast, or heaven's Cherubins, hors'd
Upon the sightless couriers of the air,

— Macbeth, in William Shakespeare, Macbeth, I.VII.21–3.

The audience is challenged to complete the sense. The late romances, with their shifts in time and surprising turns of plot, inspired a last poetic style in which long and short sentences are set against one another, clauses are piled up, subject and object are reversed, and words are omitted, creating an effect of spontaneity.

Shakespeare's poetic genius was allied with a practical sense of the theatre. Like all playwrights of the time, Shakespeare dramatised stories from sources such as Petrarch and Holinshed. He reshaped each plot to create several centres of interest and show as many sides of a narrative to the audience as possible. This strength of design ensures that a Shakespeare play can survive translation, cutting and wide interpretation without loss to its core drama. As Shakespeare's mastery grew, he gave his characters clearer and more varied motivations and distinctive patterns of speech. He preserved aspects of his earlier style in the later plays, however. In his late romances, he deliberately returned to a more artificial style, which emphasised the illusion of theatre.

== Form ==
In some of Shakespeare's early works, punctuation at the end of the lines strengthens the rhythm. He and other dramatists at the time used this form of blank verse for much of the dialogue between characters to elevate the poetry of drama. To end many scenes in his plays he used a rhyming couplet, thus creating suspense. A typical example occurs in Macbeth as Macbeth leaves the stage to murder Duncan:

[A bell rings.
I go, and it is done: the bell invites me.
Hear it not, Duncan; for it is a knell
That summons thee to Heaven, or to Hell. [Exit.

— Macbeth, in William Shakespeare, Macbeth, II.I.62–4.

His plays make effective use of the soliloquy, in which a character makes a solitary speech, giving the audience insight to the character's motivations and inner conflict. The character either speaks to the audience directly (in the case of choruses, or characters that become epilogues), or more commonly, speaks to himself or herself in the fictional realm. Shakespeare's writing features extensive wordplay of double entendres and clever rhetorical flourishes. Humour is a key element in all of Shakespeare's plays. His works have been considered controversial through the centuries for his use of bawdy punning, to the extent that "virtually every play is shot through with sexual puns." Indeed, in the nineteenth century, popular censored versions of the plays were produced as The Family Shakspeare [sic] by Henrietta Bowdler (writing anonymously) and later by her brother Thomas Bowdler. Comedy is not confined to Shakespeare's comedies, and is a core element of many of the tragedy and history plays. For example, comic scenes dominate over historical material in Henry IV, Part 1.

== Similarities to contemporaries ==
Besides following the popular forms of his day, Shakespeare's general style is comparable to several of his contemporaries. His works have many similarities to the writing of Christopher Marlowe, and seem to reveal strong influences from the Queen's Men's performances, especially in his history plays. His style is also comparable to Francis Beaumont's and John Fletcher's, other playwrights of the time.

Shakespeare often borrowed plots from other plays and stories. Hamlet, for example, is comparable to Saxo Grammaticus' Gesta Danorum. Romeo and Juliet is thought to be based on Arthur Brooke's narrative poem The Tragical History of Romeus and Juliet. King Lear is based on the story of King Leir in Historia Regum Britanniae by Geoffrey of Monmouth, which was retold in 1587 by Raphael Holinshed. Borrowing plots in this way was not uncommon at the time. After Shakespeare's death, playwrights quickly began borrowing from his works, a tradition that continues to this day.

== Differences from contemporaries ==
Shakespeare's works express the complete range of human experience. His characters were human beings who commanded the sympathy of audiences when many other playwrights' characters were flat or archetypes. Macbeth, for example, commits six murders by the end of the fourth act, and is responsible for many deaths offstage, yet still commands an audience's sympathy until the very end because he is seen as a flawed human being, not a monster. Hamlet knows that he must avenge the death of his father, but he is too indecisive, too self-doubting, to carry this out until he has no choice. His failings cause his downfall, and he exhibits some of the most basic human reactions and emotions. Shakespeare's characters were complex and human in nature. By making the protagonist's character development central to the plot, Shakespeare changed what could be accomplished with drama.

== Sources ==
- Berryman, John (2001). "The Crisis". In Haffenden, John (ed.). Berryman's Shakespeare: Essays, Letters and Other Writings. Essays, Letters and Other Writings by John Berryman. Tauris Parke Paperbacks. pp. 100–19. ISBN 978-1860646430.
- Boulton, Marjorie (2014) [first published 1960]. The Anatomy of Drama. Routledge Revivals. Routledge. ISBN 978-1317936145.
- Bradley, A. C. (1991). Shakespearean Tragedy: Lectures on Hamlet, Othello, King Lear and Macbeth. London: Penguin. ISBN 0-14-053019-3.
- Clemen, Wolfgang H. (1987). Shakespeare's soliloquies. Translated by Charity Scott Stokes. London and New York: Methuen. ISBN 0-416-05862-0.
- Clemen, Wolfgang (2005). Shakespeare's Dramatic Art: Collected Essays. Routledge Library Editions. Vol. 7. New York: Psychology Press. ISBN 978-0415352789.
- Collins, Michael J. (1989). "Macbeth and Its Audience". In Dotterer, Ronald L. (ed.). Shakespeare: Text, Subtext, and Context. Susquehanna University Press. pp. 91–96. ISBN 978-0941664929.
- Edwards, Phillip, ed. (1985). Hamlet, Prince of Denmark. New Cambridge Shakespeare. Cambridge: Cambridge University Press. ISBN 978-0521293662.
- Edwards, Phillip; Ewbank, Inga-Stina; Hunter, G. K., eds. (2004). Shakespeare's Styles: Essays in Honour of Kenneth Muir. Cambridge: Cambridge University Press. ISBN 9780521616942.
  - Bradbrook, M.C. (2004). "Shakespeare's recollections of Marlowe". In Edwards, Philip; Ewbank, Inga-Stina; Hunter, G.K. (eds.). Shakespeare's Styles: Essays in Honour of Kenneth Muir. Cambridge: Cambridge University Press. pp. 191–204. ISBN 978-0521616942.
  - Brooke, Nicholas (2004). "Language most shows a man…? Language and Speaker in Macbeth". In Edwards, Philip; Ewbank, Inga-Stina; Hunter, G.K. (eds.). Shakespeare's Styles: Essays in Honour of Kenneth Muir. Cambridge: Cambridge University Press. pp. 67–78. ISBN 9780521616942.
- Foakes, R.A., ed. (1997). King Lear. The Arden Shakespeare, third series. Bloomsbury Publishing. ISBN 978-1903436592.
- Frye, Roland Mushat (2005). Shakespeare: The art of the dramatist. Routledge library editions. Vol. 18. Psychology Press. ISBN 978-0415352895.
- Gibbons, Brian (1993). Shakespeare and Multiplicity. Cambridge: Cambridge University Press. ISBN 0-521-44406-3.
- Holland, Peter (2013) [2004]. "Shakespeare, William". Oxford Dictionary of National Biography (online ed.). Oxford University Press. doi:10.1093/ref:odnb/25200. (Subscription, Wikipedia Library access or UK public library membership required.)
- Hunter, G. K. (1997). English Drama 1586–1642: The Age of Shakespeare. The Oxford History of English Literature. Oxford: Clarendon Press. ISBN 978-0198122135.
- Jackson, MacDonald P. (2003). Defining Shakespeare: Pericles as Test Case. Oxford: Oxford University Press. ISBN 978-0199260508.
- Kastan, David Scott, ed. (2002). King Henry IV, Part 1. The Arden Shakespeare, third series. London: Bloomsbury. ISBN 978-1-90427-135-2.
- Leggatt, Alexander (1983). "Arden of Faversham". Shakespeare Survey. 36, Shakespeare in the Twentieth Century. Cambridge University Press: 121–34. doi:10.1017/CCOL0521256364.014. ISBN 978-1139053136 – via Cambridge Core.
- Mahood, M.M. (1988). Shakespeare's Wordplay. London: Routledge. ISBN 9780203359020.
- Maurer, Margaret (2005). "Review: Shakespeare and the History of Soliloquies. By James Hirsh". Shakespeare Quarterly. 56 (4). Folger Shakespeare Library: 504–07. doi:10.1353/shq.2006.0027. eISSN 1538-3555. ISSN 0037-3222. JSTOR 3844279. OCLC 1644507. S2CID 191491239.
- McCarthy, Mary (1998). "General Macbeth". In Barnet, Sylvan (ed.). The Tragedy of Macbeth. Signet classics. Penguin Random House. pp. 229–53. ISBN 978-0451526779.
- McDonald, Russ, ed. (2004). Shakespeare: An Anthology of Criticism and Theory, 1945–2000. Oxford: Blackwell. ISBN 978-0631234883.
  - Empson, William (2004). "'Honest' in Othello". In McDonald, Russ (ed.). Shakespeare: An Anthology of Criticism and Theory, 1945–2000. Oxford: Blackwell. pp. 35–49. ISBN 978-0631234883.
  - Keast, William R. (2004). "The 'New Criticism' and King Lear". In McDonald, Russ (ed.). Shakespeare: An Anthology of Criticism and Theory, 1945–2000. Oxford: Blackwell. pp. 63–88. ISBN 978-0631234883.
  - Schoenbaum, S. (2004). "Looney and the Oxfordians". In McDonald, Russ (ed.). Shakespeare: An Anthology of Criticism and Theory, 1945–2000. Oxford: Blackwell. pp. 4–14. ISBN 978-0631234883.
  - Wright, George T. (2004). "The Play of Phrase and Line". In McDonald, Russ (ed.). Shakespeare: An Anthology of Criticism and Theory, 1945–2000. Oxford: Blackwell. pp. 861–79. ISBN 978-0631234883.
- Meagher, John C. (2003). Pursuing Shakespeare's Dramaturgy: Some Contexts, Resources, and Strategies in His Playmaking. Fairleigh Dickinson University Press. ISBN 978-0838639931.
- Muir, Kenneth, ed. (1984) [first published 1951]. Macbeth. The Arden Shakespeare, second series. Bloomsbury Publishing. ISBN 978-1-9034-3648-6.
- Partridge, Eric (1947). Shakespeare's Bawdy. London: Routledge. ISBN 0-415-05076-6.
- Reich, John J.; Cunningham, Lawrence; Fichner-Rathus, Lois (2013). Culture and Values: A Survey of the Humanities. Wadsworth. ISBN 9781133951223.
- Roberts, Arthur J. (1902). "The Sources of Romeo and Juliet". Modern Language Notes. 17 (2). The Johns Hopkins University Press: 41–44. doi:10.2307/2917639. ISSN 0149-6611. JSTOR 2917639.
- Thompson, Ann; Taylor, Neil, eds. (2006). Hamlet. The Arden Shakespeare, third series. Vol. 1. London: Cengage Learning. ISBN 1-904271-33-2.
- Webster, Margaret (2012) [first published 1955]. Shakespeare Without Tears. New York: Courier Corporation. ISBN 978-0486311326.
- Wells, Stanley (2004). Looking for Sex in Shakespeare. Cambridge University Press. ISBN 0-521-54039-9.
