= Nigel Leask =

Scottish professor

Nigel Leask FRSE FEA
- Born: 29 September 1958 (age 68); Edinburgh, Scotland
- Other names: Nigel J. Leask, Nigel Leask
- Occupations: Academic, literary critic, cultural historian
- Children: 2 (children)

Academic background
- Education: Edinburgh Academy
- Alma mater: University of Oxford; University of Cambridge

Academic work
- Institutions: University of Cambridge; University of Glasgow
- Main interests: Scottish literature, British Empire, Romanticism, eighteenth-century literature, Anglo-Indian literature, Orientalism
- Notable works: Robert Burns and Pastoral: Poetry and Improvement in Late-18th Century Scotland (2010)

Nigel James Leask (born 29 September 1958) is a Scottish academic publishing on Romantic, Scottish, and Anglo-Indian literature, with special interest on British Empire, Orientalism, and travel writing. He has been Regius Professor of English language and literature at the University of Glasgow, since 2004.

He won the Saltire Society Scottish Research Book of the Year award in 2010 for his book Robert Burns and Pastoral: Poetry and Improvement in Late-18th Century Scotland. He is a fellow of Royal Society of Edinburgh and a Centenary Fellow of the English Association.

== Early life and education ==
He was born in September 29,1958 and grew up in Stirlingshire. He was educated at Edinburgh Academy, University of Oxford, and University of Cambridge before taking up a position of Reader in Romantic literature at Cambridge University. He is married and has two daughters.

== Career ==
In 2004, he was appointed to Regius chair of English language and literature at University of Glasgow, and is Head of the School of Critical Studies, currently from 1 August 2010. He also held teaching appointments at the University of Bologna, Italy; University of Dundee, Scotland; and a visiting professorship at the Universidad Nacional Autónoma de México (UNAM), Mexico City. He has lectured widely in India, Europe, and Americas.

He published The Politics of Imagination in Coleridge’s Critical Thought, his first book, in 1988; subsequently, British Romantic Writers and the East: Anxieties of Empire in 1992, and many others later.

== Bibliography ==
- The Politics of Imagination in Coleridge’s Critical Thought, 1988.
- British Romantic Writers and the East: Anxieties of Empire, 1992.
- Curiosity and the Aesthetics of Travel Writing, 1770-1840: From an Antique Land, 2002.
- Irish republicans and gothic Eleutherarchs: Pacific utopias in the writings of Theobald Wolfe Tone and Charles Brockden Brown, 2002.
- Darwin's Second Sun: Alexander von Humboldt and the Genesis of the Voyage of the Beagle, 2003.
- Land, Nation and Culture, 1740-1840: Thinking the Republic of Taste, 2004, co-edited with David Simpson and Peter De Bolla.
- Maurice, Thomas (1754–1824), oriental scholar and librarian, 2004.
- Burns, Wordsworth and the politics of vernacular poetry, 2005.
- Byron and the eastern Mediterranean: Childe Harold II and the polemic of Ottoman Greece, 2005.
- Travelling the Other Way: The travels of Mirza Abu Talib Khan (1810) and romantic Orientalism, 2006.
- Kubla Khan and orientalism: the road to Xanadu revisited, 2006.
- Thomas Muir and the telegraph: radical cosmopolitanism in 1790s Scotland. History Workshop Journal, 2007.
- His Hero's Story': Dr Currie's Burns, Moore's Byron and Romantic Biography, 2008.
- Romanticism and Popular Culture in Britain and Ireland, 2009, co-edited with Phil Connel.
- Robert Burns and Pastoral: Poetry and Improvement in Late-18th Century Scotland, 2010.
- Their Groves o' Sweet Myrtles': Robert Burns and the Scottish Colonial Experience, 2012.

== Awards ==
- Saltire Award - Scottish Research Book of the Year 2010.

== Notes ==
Academic offices
Preceded by Stephen Prickett	Regius Professor of English Language and Literature, University of Glasgow; 2004–to date	Succeeded by incumbent
