= Adam Gifford, Lord Gifford =

Scottish advocate for judge

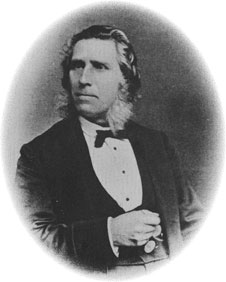
Lord Gifford.

Adam Gifford, Lord Gifford FRSE (/ˈɡɪfərd/; 29 February 1820 Edinburgh – 20 January 1887) was a Scottish advocate and judge. He was the founder of the Gifford Lectures.

== Life ==
Gifford was born in Edinburgh on 29 February 1820 to Katherine Ann (née West) (1786–1873) and James Gifford (1780–1862), an affluent grocer and Treasurer of the Merchant Company of Edinburgh. His twin brother was John Gifford (1820–1895). His childhood home was at 22 Union Place in the east end of the New Town.

He went to school at Edinburgh Institution (now known as Stewart's Melville) and in 1835 was apprenticed to be a solicitor with his uncle, Alexander Gifford SSC at 2 Hill Square on the south side of the city. He then studied law at the University of Edinburgh and was called to the bar as an advocate in 1849.

He was a Radical in politics, and expected no appointment from Government, until he was made an advocate depute in 1861, under Palmerston. He prosecuted cases for the Crown including Jessie McLauchlan in the 1863 Sandyford murder case. He was appointed Sheriff of Orkney and Shetland in 1865, but delegated his duties to a resident sheriff-substitute and continued his private practice as an advocate.

In 1870 he was elected a Fellow of the Royal Society of Edinburgh his proposer was Sir Charles Neaves. At this stage in his life he lived at 4 Lower Joppa with his brother John on the eastern coastline of the city.

His lucrative private practice as an advocate made him a fortune, which he bequeathed towards the endowment of the four Gifford Lectureships on natural theology in connection with each of the four universities in Scotland then extant (Aberdeen, Glasgow, Edinburgh and St Andrews); he was a man of a philosophical turn of mind, and a student of the works of Spinoza. He held office as a judge from 1870 to 1881, despite symptoms of paralysis from 1872 onwards. On his resignation, due to ill-health, he was replaced by Patrick Fraser thereafter known as Lord Fraser.

He died at his home, Granton House in Granton, Edinburgh on 20 January 1887 and is buried in Old Calton Cemetery with his parents.

== Family ==
In 1863 he married Margaret Elliot Pott (1842–1868), 22 years his junior. They had one son, Herbert James Gifford FRSE (born 1864) who became a civil engineer. Margaret died aged 26 (probably in childbirth).

He was the uncle of Sir Walter Raleigh (1861–1922), the professor of English at the University of Glasgow.
