= Botley Bridge =

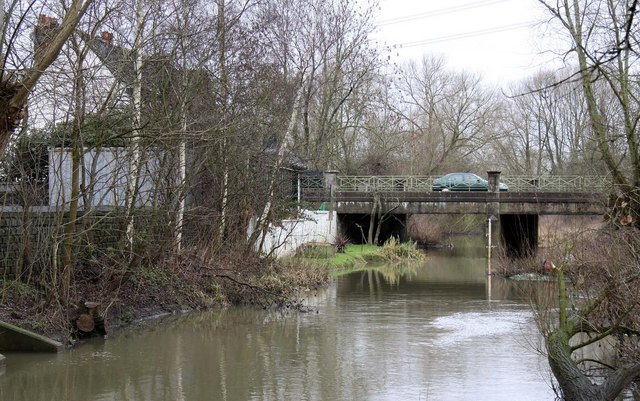
- Botley Bridge over the Seacourt Stream.
- Coordinates: 51.753244°N 1.290658°W
- Carries: A420 road
- Crosses: Seacourt Stream
- Locale: Oxford
- Maintained by: Oxfordshire County Council

Characteristics
- No. of spans: 2

Botley Bridge (or Botley Road Bridge) is a road bridge across Seacourt Stream, a branch of the River Thames in Oxford, England.

The bridge is on the A420 arterial road at the point where the Botley Road out of Oxford becomes West Way, west of the centre of the city. It forms the boundary of the city limits of Oxford at this point. Further west are Botley and the Oxford Ring Road.

Historically, this was the boundary of Berkshire and Oxfordshire before the 1974 county boundary changes. Between Botley and Oxford there are a number of road bridges crossing various branches of the Thames, including Bulstake Bridge over Bulstake Stream and Osney Bridge over the main branch of the Thames, also on Botley Road, as well as Hythe Bridge and Pacey's Bridge over the Castle Mill Stream, next to the end of the Oxford Canal.

There is an Ordnance Survey surveying benchmark on one of the piers of the bridge.

== See also ==
- Crossings of the River Thames
