= Bulstake Bridge =

Bridge in United Kingdom

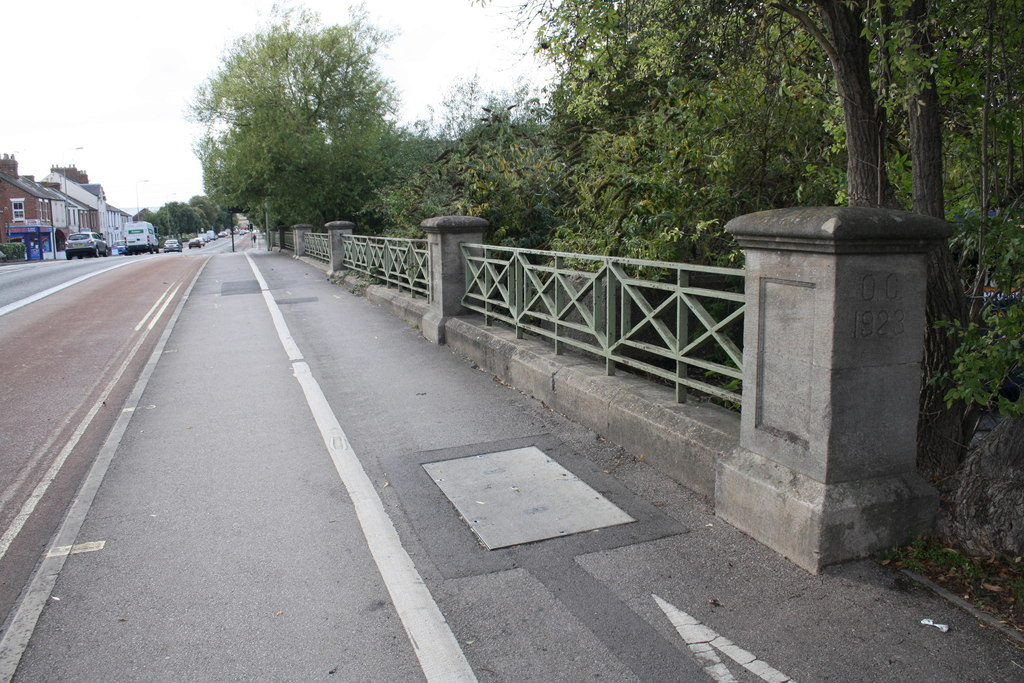
- View west along Botley Road at Bulstake Bridge.
- Coordinates: 51.752556°N 1.281302°W
- Carries: Botley Road (A420 road)
- Crosses: Bulstake Stream
- Locale: Oxford, England
- Maintained by: Oxfordshire County Council

History
- Opened: c.1530 Rebuilt 1721 and 1923–4

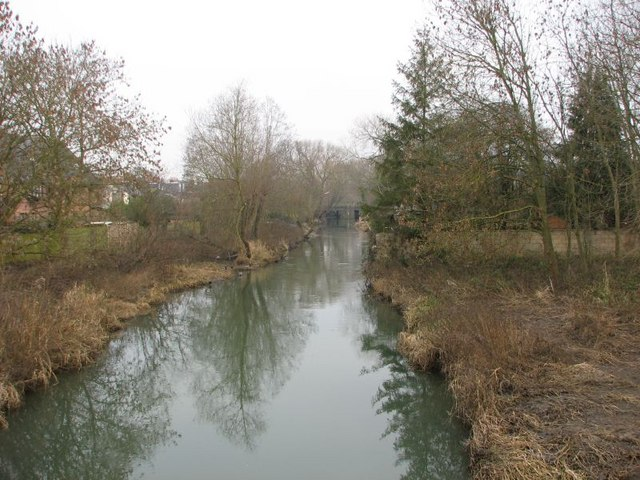
Bulstake Stream looking towards the road bridge.

Bulstake Bridge is a road bridge across the Bulstake Stream, a branch of the River Thames in Oxford, England.

The original stone arch bridge was built by John Claymond (1468–1537), the first President of Corpus Christi College (one of the colleges of Oxford University), in around 1530. The bridge was rebuilt with a higher arch in 1721. It was reconstructed again in 1923–4.

The bridge is on the Botley Road (designated the A420) in New Botley. To the west is Botley itself and to the east is New Osney. Between Botley and Oxford there are a number of road bridges crossing various branches of the Thames, including Botley Bridge over Seacourt Stream and Osney Bridge over the main branch of the Thames, also on Botley Road, and Hythe Bridge over the Castle Mill Stream, next to the end of the Oxford Canal.

There is an Ordnance Survey surveying benchmark on one of the piers of the bridge.

== See also ==
- Crossings of the River Thames
