= Osney Bridge =

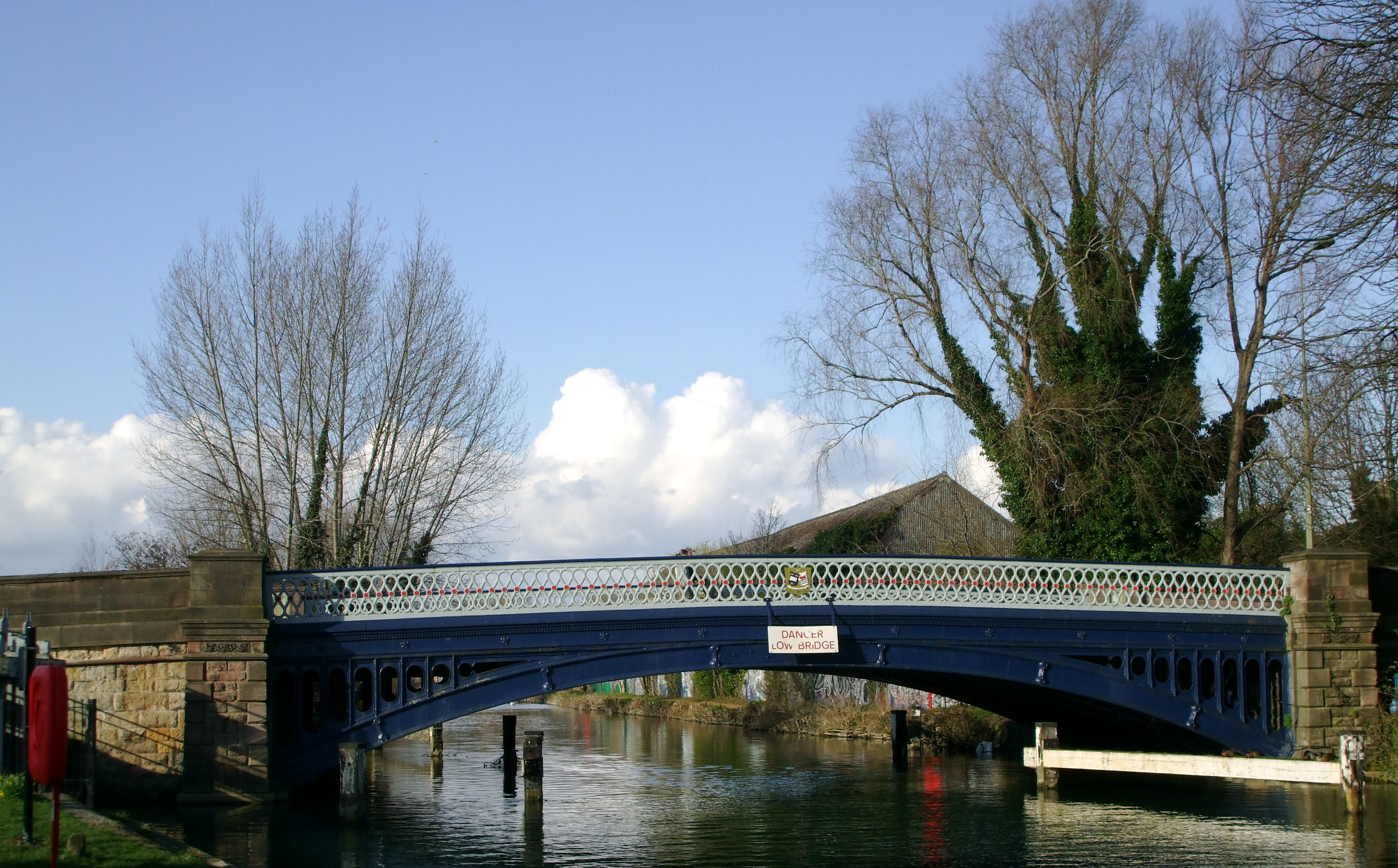
- Osney Bridge looking north from Osney Island
- Coordinates: 51.752694°N 1.273093°W
- Carries: A420 road, Thames Path
- Crosses: River Thames
- Locale: Oxford
- Maintained by: Oxfordshire County Council

Characteristics
- Design: arch
- Material: Iron
- Height: 7 feet 6 inches (2.29 m)
- No. of spans: 1

History
- Opened: 1889

Location
- Interactive map of Osney Bridge

Osney Bridge is a road bridge across the River Thames in Oxford, England, built in 1888 to replace a stone bridge which collapsed in 1885. It carries the Botley Road (A420) from Botley into Oxford. The Thames Path crosses the river on this bridge, just above Osney Lock.

The original bridge was probably built by the monks of Osney Abbey, to carry the main road across the millstream of Osney Mill west of the island then known as Osney. By the early 17th century it was a three-arch stone construction. In 1790 the millstream became the main navigation channel of the river, and the bridge had become a serious obstruction to navigation by the mid 19th century. In 1885 the central arch collapsed, leaving massive piers.

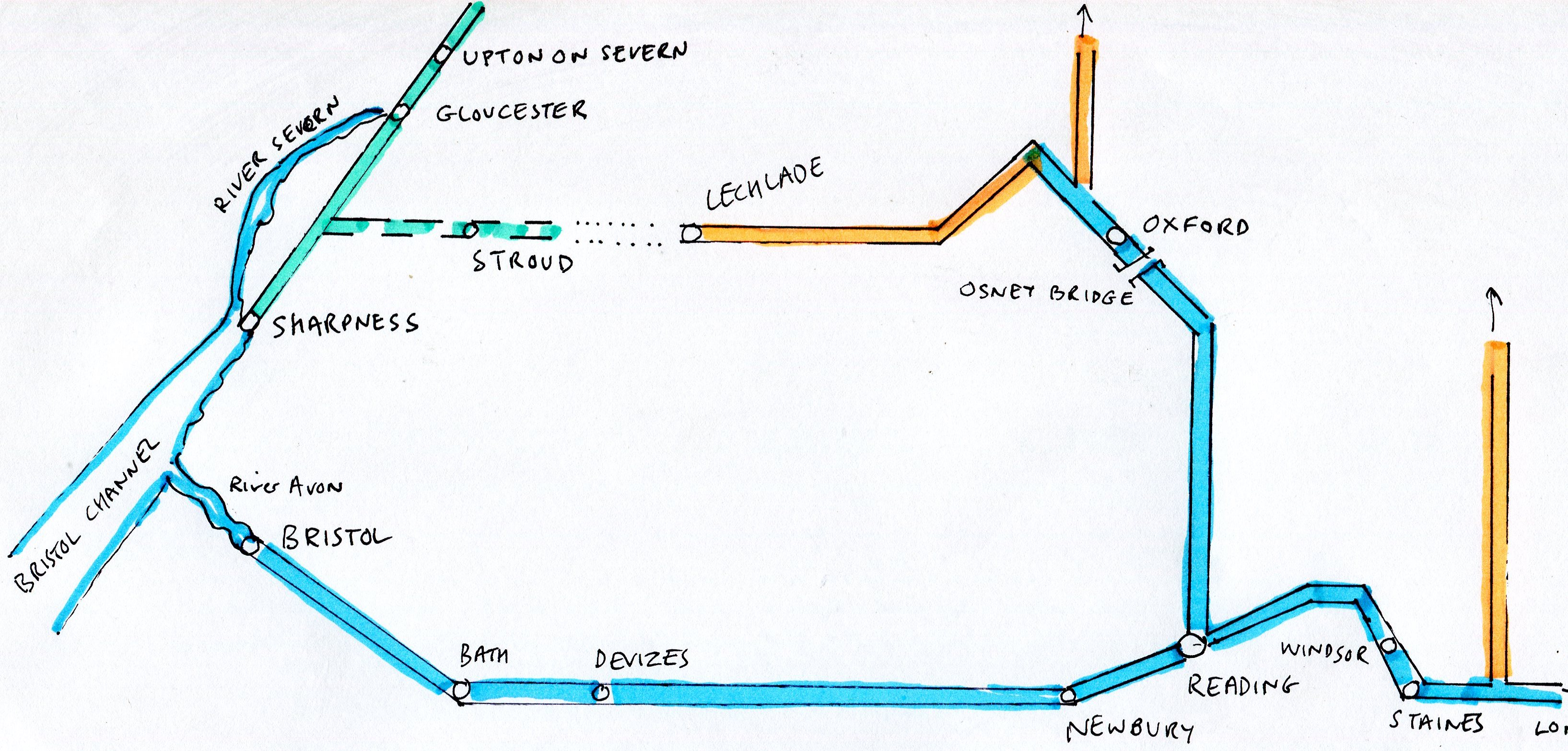
Diagram of the English southern canals, showing the Osney Bottleneck and the proposed canal restoration between Stroud and Lechlade.

== Proposals to raise Osney Bridge ==
Osney Bridge has the lowest headroom (less than 7 feet 6 inches, or 2.3 metres) of any bridge across the navigable Thames; this limits the size of boats that can travel past it without having to be removed from the water and launched upstream of the bridge. Some boats may be able to negotiate the bridge at lower water levels, only to be unable to pass through when water levels are higher.

== See also ==
- Crossings of the River Thames
- Botley Bridge over Seacourt Stream
- Bulstake Bridge over Bulstake Stream

Next crossing upstream	River Thames	Next crossing downstream
Medley Footbridge (pedestrian)	Osney Bridge	Osney Rail Bridge (railway)
Next crossing upstream	Thames Path	Next crossing downstream
northern bank Medley Footbridge	Osney Bridge	southern bank Abingdon Lock
