= Osney Stream =

Branch of the River Thames in Oxford

Osney Stream is a branch of the River Thames in Oxford, England. It is one of the principal watercourses in west Oxford, forming part of the network of channels that create Osney Island.

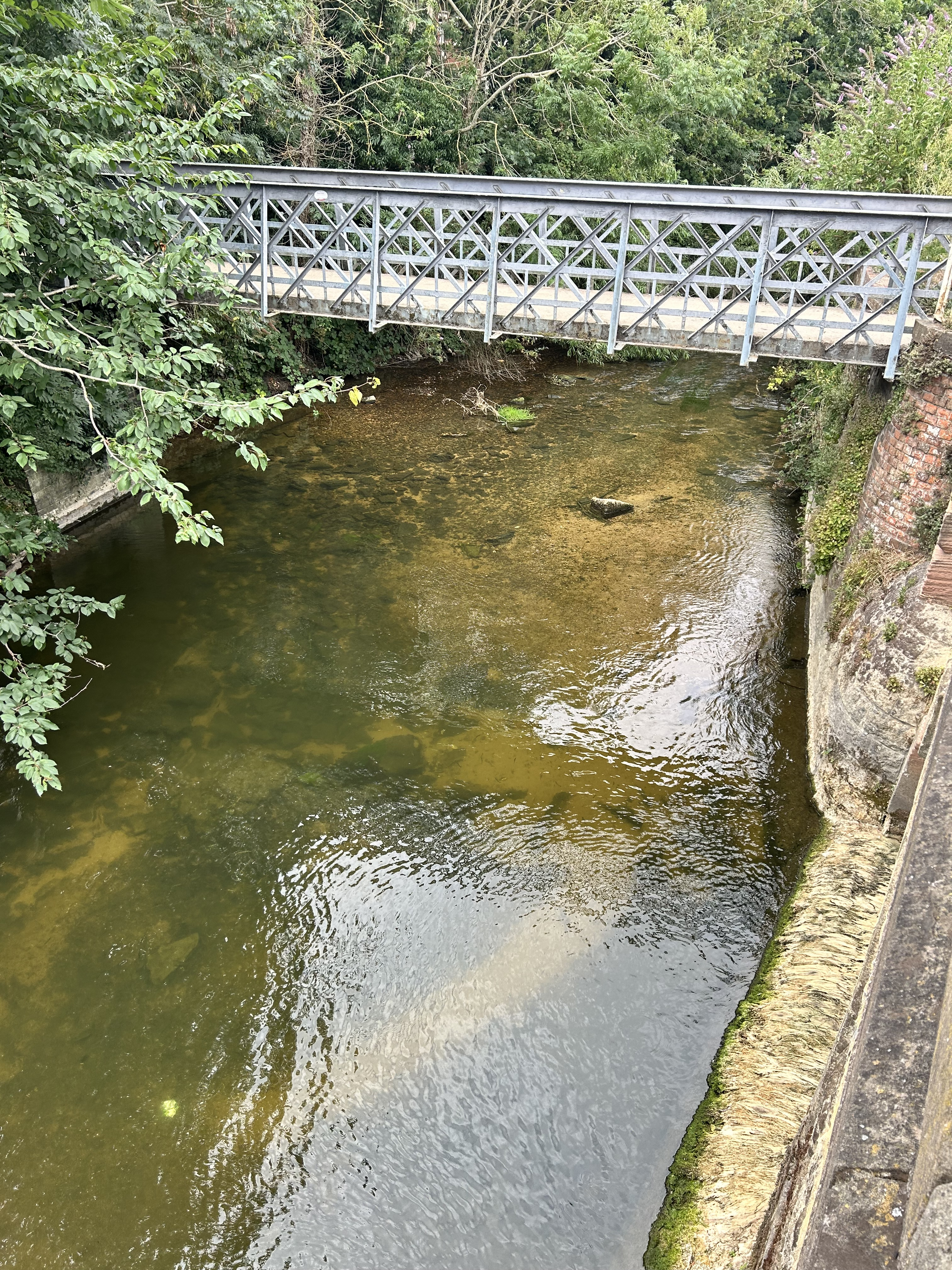
Osney Stream

== Watercourse ==
Osney Stream branches off from the main stream of the Thames and flows to the West before rejoining the main river downstream at Osney Lock. In this upper reach, Osney Stream runs along the northern edge of Osney Island, acting as a tree-lined buffer between the island's residential streets and the Botley Road. South of Botley Road, Osney Stream flows past St Frideswide's church, which stands on its own small island between the stream and Osney Ditch.

The entire length of Osney Stream is only about a mile, but it is integral to the hydrology of central Oxford, effectively carrying a portion of the Thames around the city's west side.

== History ==
Osney Stream's origins date back to the Middle Ages, when it was used as a millstream for the medieval Osney Abbey. Between 1182 and 1189, Bernard of St. Valery granted the canons of Osney Abbey rights to build a weir on the Thames and divert water to power their mill. This led to the creation of a mill race – the early Osney Stream – to drive Osney Mill, a corn mill operated by the abbey. By the 13th century, the site had multiple waterwheels and even a fulling mill for cloth production, underscoring the stream's role in Oxford's medieval industry. In 1790, the navigation of the Thames in Oxford was improved with the opening of Osney Lock. The stream's course and surrounding infrastructure also saw changes with urban development: the Botley Road causeway was raised and bridged in the 19th century, earning the nickname "Seven Bridges Road" due to the number of stream channels it crossed.

== Biodiversity ==
Today the stream is notable for its ecological value, providing rich habitats for fish and other wildlife. Osney Stream is recognized as an important urban wildlife corridor with a high biodiversity value. Despite its location in the heart of Oxford, the stream supports a variety of habitats for aquatic and riparian species.

=== Fish ===
The watercourse has a gravelly bed and a steady flow of fresh, oxygenated water, conditions ideal for many riverine invertebrates and fish.

Surveys have recorded a high diversity of fish in the stream. According to an Environment Agency assessment, species present include roach, dace, perch, pike, gudgeon, bleak, silver and common bream, barbel, ruffe, bullheads, and lamprey eels.

In late spring, fish such as chub and barbel leave the main Thames to spawn in the side streams; Osney Stream's shallow, gravelled sections with good flow are especially favored for breeding. Large numbers of chub gather here during spawning season, depositing eggs among the gravel, and juvenile fish use the quieter backwater as a nursery habitat before returning to the main river.

=== Birds ===
Kingfishers and grey herons are often seen along the stream, taking advantage of the rich fish population in the stream. As of 2025, a particular heron has become locally famous for hunting in the stream near Osney Bridge, and kingfishers have been often been sighted darting from the banks by the vicarage of St Frideswide Church. Other water birds such as ducks, swans, and moorhens are common sights as well, especially in the quieter reaches downstream. Birds of prey, such as sparrowhawks and red kites, are observed overhead or hunting along the river corridor.

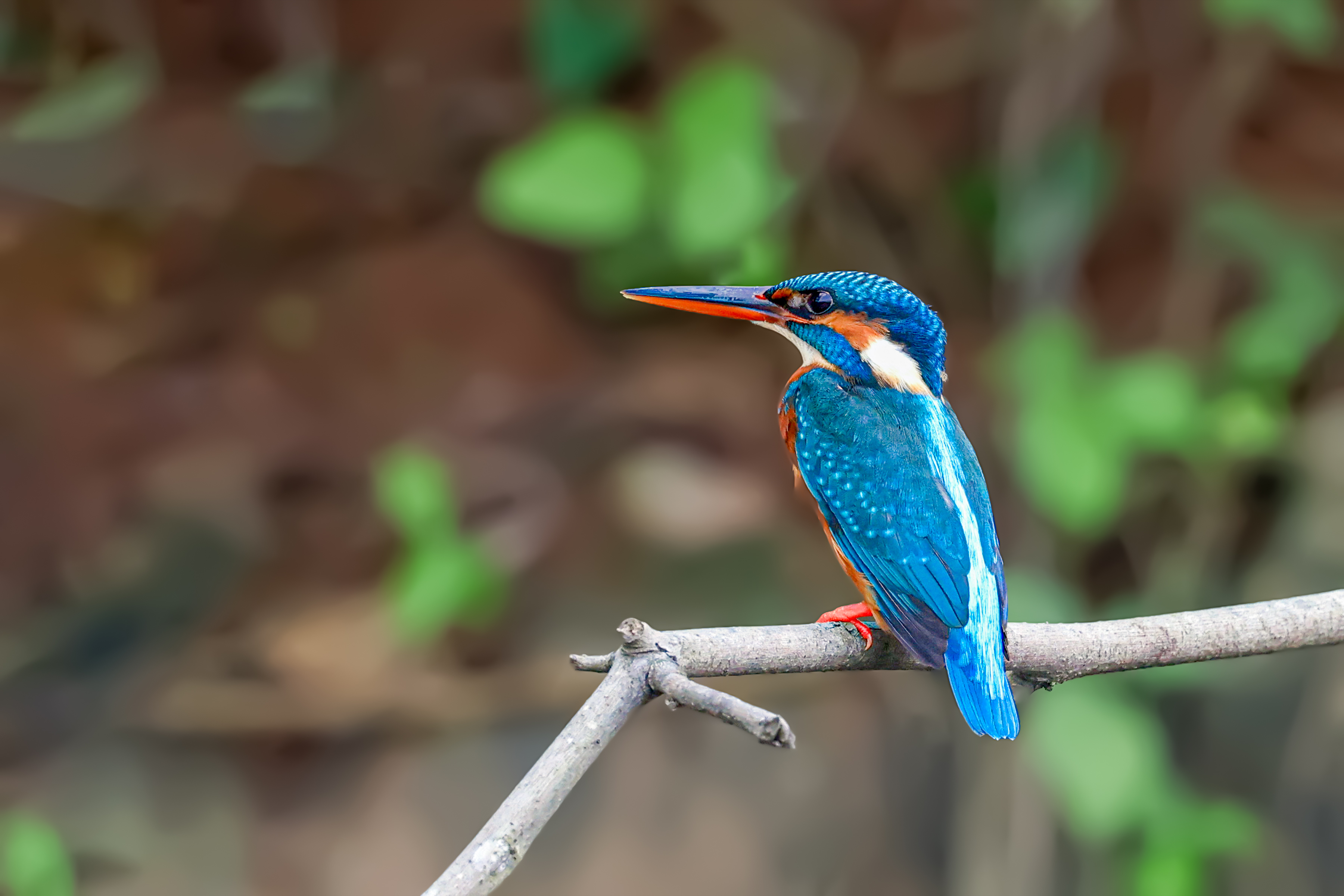
Kingfishers are supported by the rich fish population of Osney Stream

=== Mammals ===
The stream's green banks and adjacent gardens host a surprising variety of urban wildlife. Residents of Osney Island have reported otters using the waterways, indicating that this once-endangered mammal is returning to Oxford's rivers. Water voles, another protected species in British waterways, have also found a suitable habitat in the marshy edges of the stream. Even badgers and small muntjac deer are commonly sighted.
