= Willow Walk =

Willow Walk may refer to

- A former railway depot next to Bricklayers Arms railway station in South East London
- A path between Oxford and North Hinksey, continuing Ferry Hinksey Road
