= Medley Footbridge =

Bridge in Oxford, England

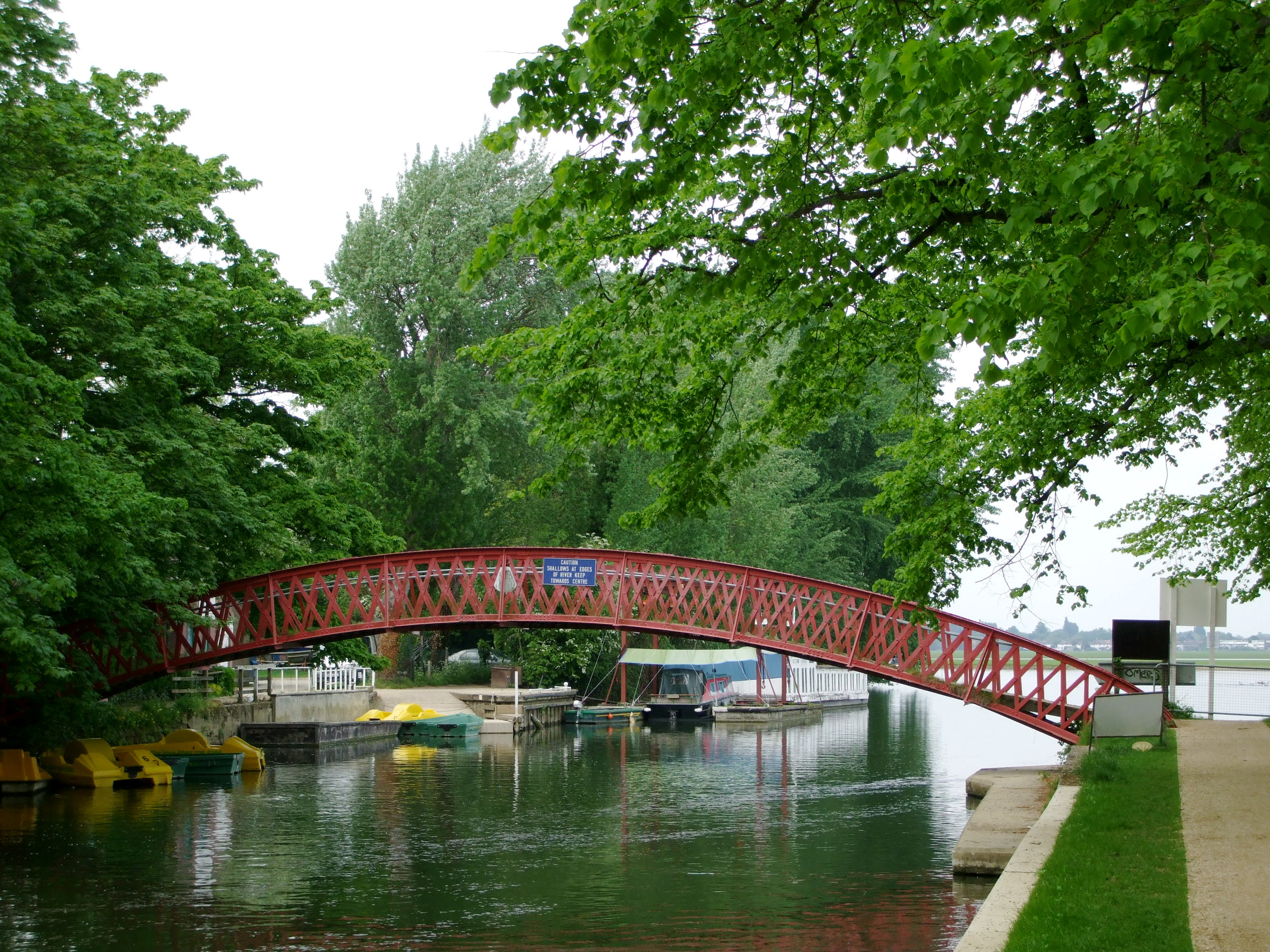
- Medley Footbridge looking north from the Thames towpath
- Coordinates: 51.763888°N 1.280303°W
- Crosses: River Thames
- Locale: Oxford
- Official name: Rainbow Bridge

Characteristics
- Design: Arch
- Material: Iron
- Height: 10 feet 0 inches (3.05 m)
- No. of spans: 1

History
- Opened: 1865

Medley Footbridge is a pedestrian bridge across the River Thames near the village of Binsey in Oxford, England. It is also known as Rainbow Bridge, although there is another bridge of that name in the University Parks in Oxford.

The bridge bears a plaque with a misspelling which apparently gave rise to a third name, the 'Subscription Bridge':

This bridge was erected by public subs[c]ription through the exertion and during the shrievalty of Henry Grant Esquire. A.D. 1865.

A second plaque, using the name Rainbow Bridge, records its restoration in 1997.

The bridge joins the west bank of the river to Fiddler's Island in the stream. There is another bridge linking the island to the east bank, just above the point at which the Castle Mill Stream diverges to the east of the navigable channel. The name Medley for the west bank of the Thames at this point designates the 'middle island' between Osney and Binsey.

== See also ==
- Crossings of the River Thames

Next crossing upstream	River Thames	Next crossing downstream
Godstow Bridge (road)	Medley Footbridge	Osney Bridge (road)
Next crossing upstream	Thames Path	Next crossing downstream
southern bank Pinkhill Lock	Medley Footbridge	northern bank Osney Bridge
