= Botley, Oxfordshire =

Village in Oxfordshire, England

Coordinates: 51°45′03″N 1°18′02″W

Botley
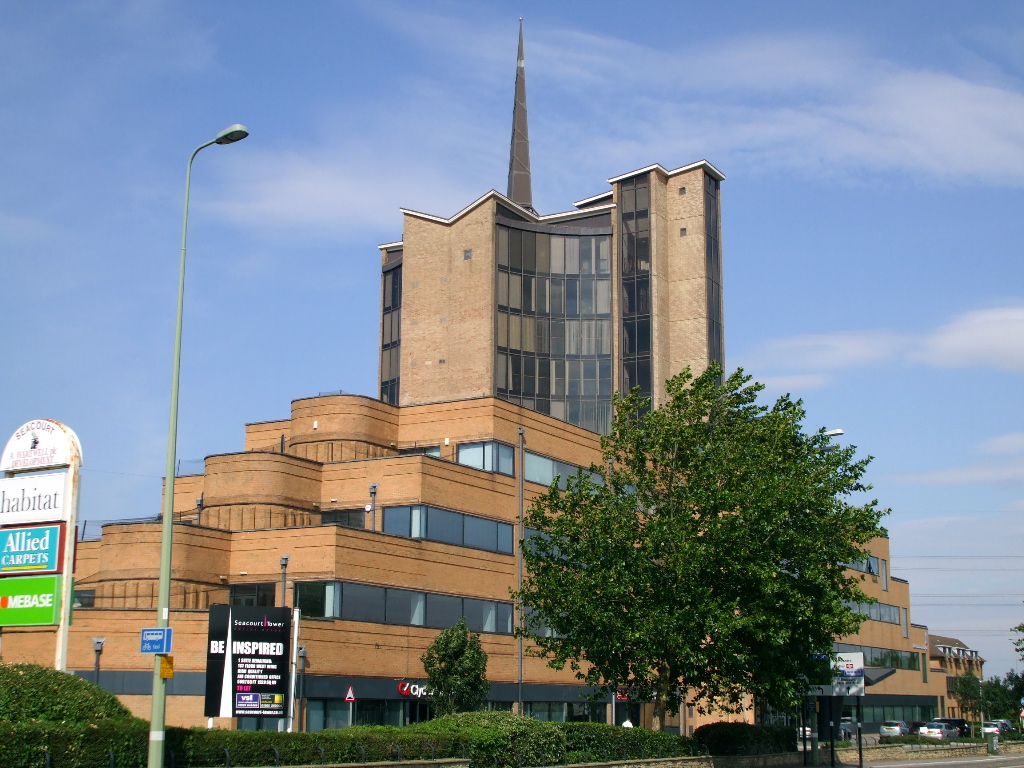
- Seacourt Tower

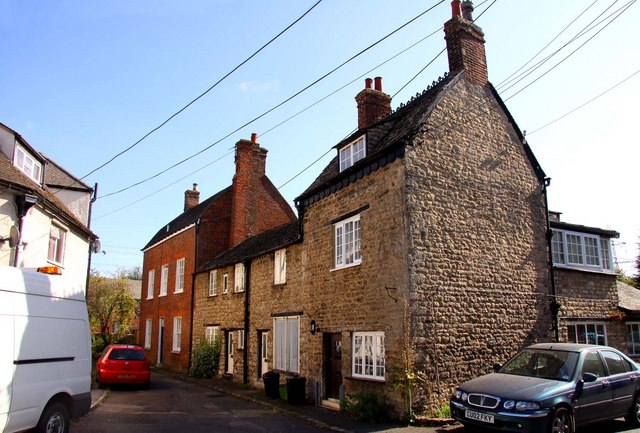
- Old houses in Botley

- Location within Oxfordshire
- OS grid reference: SP483060
- Civil parish: Botley and North Hinksey
- District: Vale of White Horse
- Shire county: Oxfordshire
- Region: South East
- Country: England
- Sovereign state: United Kingdom
- Post town: Oxford
- Postcode district: OX2
- Dialling code: 01865
- Police: Thames Valley
- Fire: Oxfordshire
- Ambulance: South Central
- UK Parliament: Oxford West and Abingdon

Botley is a residential village in the civil parish of Botley and North Hinksey, in the Vale of White Horse district, in the county of Oxfordshire, England, just west of the Oxford city boundary. Historically part of Berkshire, it stands on the Seacourt Stream, a stream running off the River Thames. The intersection of the A34 and A420 is to the village's north.

== Topography ==
Botley, aside from central offices and a commercial square, is a residential suburb of Oxford. Generally, house prices are above average for the Oxford area, from average in its east (similar to much of Dean Court), to very expensive towards where the settlement adjoins Cumnor Hill, in its south. It lies, apart from a small section which is southeast, southwest of the junction between the A34 (Oxford ring road) and the A420 westward to Swindon. The contiguous neighbourhood Dean Court adjoins Botley to its west, in the Cumnor civil parish. The other settlements which merge into this settlement are North Hinksey and Cumnor Hill. Elevations range from 56m on the Hinksey Stream marking much of the eastern border to the western border which ranges from 80 to 120m AOD from north to south. The southern point is a border of Cumnor Hill and adjoins Matthew Arnold School.

== Landmarks and economy ==
Botley shops comprise Elms Parade and the West Way shopping precinct. The various large office buildings along the main road include Seacourt Tower, known locally as "Botley Cathedral" owing to its small metal spire, originally built in 1965–66 as a car showroom and garage to a design by Beecher and Stamford. It remains in the ownership of Hartwell Ford.

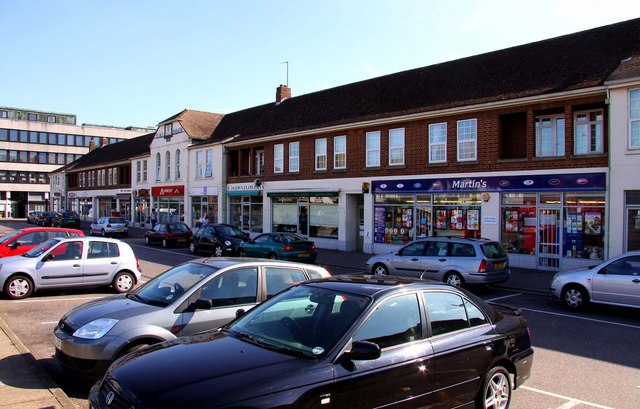
Elms Parade

== Religion ==
Botley's Church of England church of St Peter and St Paul on West Way, built in 1958, is one of four in its benefice which reaches outside the historic ecclesiastical parish to include St Frideswide's Church, Oxford, St Lawrence's Church, North Hinksey and St. Margaret of Antioch, Binsey. Other Christian churches in Botley include Calvary Chapel and Roman Catholic Church, the oldest being Botley Baptist established in 1890.

== History ==
Botley was first settled in the Saxon era. Its toponym comes from the Old English, meaning a woodland clearing of a man called Bota. It has since fallen within the parish of North Hinksey, and so was historically in the county of Berkshire, as marked in its northern half by the Vale of White Horse district boundary on the map. Because the main road west out of Oxford has passed through Botley since the 16th century, development since then was centred here rather than in the village of North Hinksey itself, slightly further southeast. From the 1880s, the centre of the village began to be called Old Botley, in distinction to the New Botley development along Botley Road in Oxford. The name Old Botley is preserved in a street set back from the main road. The major development which began in the 1930s took place to the west, beyond the current ring road.

To the north of Botley was the lost village of Seacourt. The site of the former village is in neighbouring Wytham parish, but it is commemorated in Botley in the names of Seacourt Tower, Seacourt Hall and the Seacourt Bridge public house.

== Localities ==
=== New Botley ===
A park and ride site is closest to Botley itself in the much narrower New Botley which is confined by low-lying playing fields, an allotment site and river meadows on the north and south sides. Immediately east is the seven arches bridge, which is listed. To the north side of that section is a golf driving range and on the south side, the large Osney Mead industrial estate.

== Famous inhabitants ==
- Guy Browning, humorist, grew up in Botley
- Oswald Rayner, MI6 agent and journalist

== Sources ==
- Hanson, John (1995). The Changing Faces of Botley and North Hinksey. Witney: Robert Boyd. pp. 7, 26.
- Sherwood, Jennifer; Pevsner, Nikolaus (1974). Oxfordshire. The Buildings of England. Harmondsworth: Penguin Books. p. 335. ISBN 0-14-071045-0.
