= Seacourt =

Deserted medieval village in Oxfordshire, England

Coordinates: 51.761°N 1.299°W

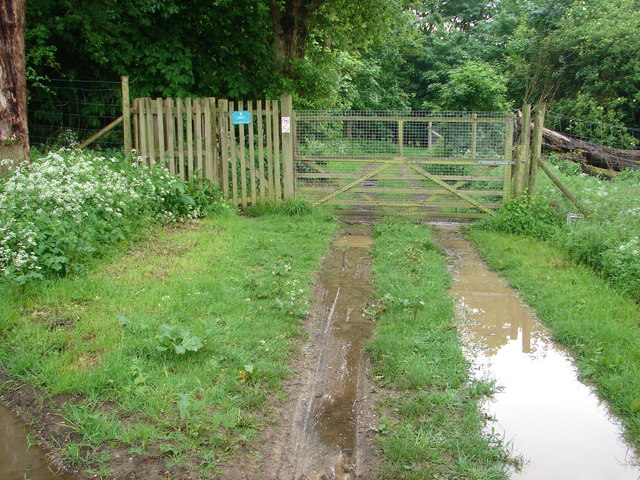
- Woodland entrance in the former parish

- Location within Oxfordshire
- Civil parish: Wytham
- District: Vale of White Horse
- Shire county: Oxfordshire
- Region: South East
- Country: England
- Sovereign state: United Kingdom

Seacourt is a deserted medieval village (DMV) in the civil parish of Wytham, in the Vale of White Horse district, in Oxfordshire, England, near the city of Oxford.The site is now mostly beneath the Oxford Western By-pass (A34), about 0.3 miles (0.48 km) south of the Seacourt/Hinksey Stream crossing.

The site is designated as a Scheduled Monument. The site of Seacourt DMV was part of Berkshire until the 1974 boundary changes transferred it to Oxfordshire.

== Name ==
The earliest known reference to Seacourt is the name Seofecanwyrthe in Eadwig's charter of c.957. The name was recorded in the Domesday Book of 1086 as Seuaworde (Seua..worde).

According to Eilert Ekwall, Seacourt's toponym is derived from the Old English, apparently meaning the homestead of an Anglo-Saxon man called Seofeca. It evolved from Seofecanwyrthe and Seovecurt in the 10th century, through Sevacoorde and Sevecurt in the 11th century, Sewkeworth and Seuekwrth in the 12th century, Sevecheworda and Sevecowrthe in the 13th century and Sekworth and Sewecourte in the 16th century.

== Manor ==
The earliest known record of Seacourt is from 955, when King Eadwig granted 20 hides of land at Hinksey, Seacourt and Wytham to the Benedictine Abingdon Abbey. By the time of the Domesday Book in 1086 the abbey had let the lordship of the manor of Seacourt to a lay tenant.

In 1313 one Walter le Poer of Tackley, Oxfordshire granted the manor to Sir William Bereford and his son for the rest of their lives. Subsequently, the reversion of the manor was granted to Isabel de Vesci and her brother Henry de Beaumont. After the deaths of the younger Bereford and Isabel de Vesci, Henry de Beaumont granted Seacourt to his son John Beaumont and daughter-in-law Eleanor Plantaganet. In 1409 their son Henry Beaumont, 3rd Baron Beaumont sold Seacourt to one William Wilcotes of North Leigh, Oxfordshire.

The manor then passed through various hands and was broken up into shares until 1469, when Sir Richard Harcourt started buying them up. By the time he died in 1486, Sir Richard owned the whole of the manors of Seacourt and Wytham. Thereafter the two manors stayed together and by 1546 Seacourt was considered part of the manor of Wytham.

== Parish church ==
Seacourt had a parish church by 1200, when Robert de Seacourt (or Seckworth), lord of the manor, granted it to the prioress of the Benedictine Studley Priory, Oxfordshire. According to a 13th-century charter Seacourt parish church was dedicated to Saint Mary. In 1439 it was reported that the church building had collapsed. In the Dissolution of the Monasteries in 1539 Studley Priory surrendered its lands to the Crown, which sold them in 1540. Studley Priory and its possessions at Seacourt were sold to one John Croke, an ancestor of the John Croke who was a lawyer, judge, member of Parliament and Speaker of the House of Commons towards the end of the reign of Elizabeth I.

== Economic and other history ==
Seacourt had two watermills. They were described as corn mills in the 12th century, when William de Seacourt, lord of the manor, granted their tithes to the Benedictine Godstow Abbey. Early in the 13th century his son Robert de Seacourt also granted their tithes to Godstow Abbey, but this time they are described as fulling mills.

All of Seacourt's original houses were timber-framed. Then in the 13th century a new north–south street was laid out and lined with stone-built houses on both sides.

The old road between Eynsham and Oxford passed through Seacourt rather than Botley. In the Middle Ages the treacle (i.e. healing) well at Binsey was a place of pilgrimage. Binsey is just on the other side of Seacourt Stream, so some pilgrims used to stay at Seacourt to visit the well. According to tradition, Seacourt had 24 inns to accommodate them. However, in 1439 the report that Seacourt parish church had collapsed stated also that all but two of the houses in the village were ruined and uninhabited.

In the time of the antiquarian Anthony Wood (1632–95) the ruins of Seacourt were still visible. Today no building survives on the site of the village but there are a few bumps in the fields. The village site was excavated between 1937 and 1939 and again in 1958 and 1959.

In 1924 there were two farms to the south of the former village. One was Seacourt Farm, which survived until 1963.

By 1831 Seacourt was an extra-parochial area. In 1858 it became a civil parish, on 1 April 1900 it was absorbed into the neighbouring parish of Wytham. In 1891 the parish had a population of 23.

The name continues in Seacourt Stream, the Seacourt Bridge public house by Seacourt Road, Seacourt Tower and Seacourt Park and Ride car park.

== Notes ==
=== Sources ===
Books

- Ekwall, Eilert (1960) [1947], "Seacourt", Concise Oxford Dictionary of English Place-Names, Oxford: Oxford University Press, ISBN 0-19-869103-3
- Hanson, John (1995). The Changing Faces of Botley and North Hinksey. Witney: Robert Boyd.
- Reaney, P H (1969). The Origin of English Place Names. Routledge & Kegan Paul.
- Clark Hall, John R. (1916). A Concise Anglo−Saxon Dictionary, Second Edition. The Macmillan Company.

Online

- Biddle, Martin (1962). "The Deserted Medieval Village of Seacourt, Berkshire" (PDF). Oxoniensia. XXVI–XXVII. Oxford Architectural and Historical Society: 70–201.
- Bruce-Mitford, R.L.S. (1940). "The Excavations at Seacourt, Berks., 1939 an interim report" (PDF). Oxoniensia. V. Oxford Architectural and Historical Society.
- Page, W.H.; Ditchfield, P.H., eds. (1924). A History of the County of Berkshire, Volume 4. Victoria County History. pp. 421–423.
- Page, W.H., ed. (1907). A History of the County of Oxford, Volume 2. Victoria County History. pp. 77–79.
- Rowley, Trevor (1978). Villages in the Landscape. Archaeology in the Field Series. London: J.M. Dent & Sons Ltd. pp. 48, 126. ISBN 0-460-04166-5.
