= Ferry Hinksey Road =

Road in west Oxford, England

Coordinates: 51.75054°N 1.27643°W

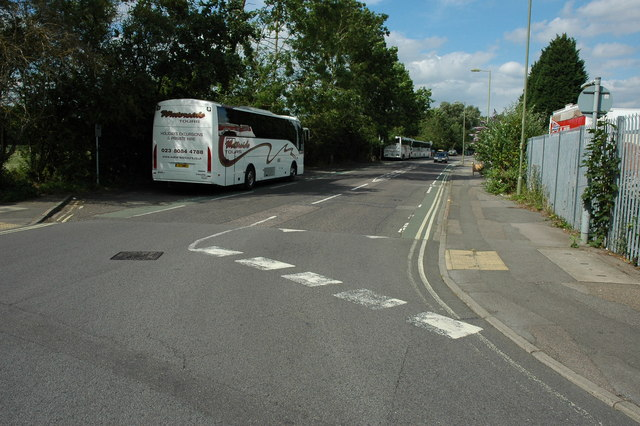
View of Ferry Hinksey Road.

Ferry Hinksey Road is a road in west Oxford, England, leading south from the Botley Road. The road leads to the Osney Mead Industrial Estate to the east, started in 1961. To the east is Osney Ditch.

== History ==
The road is named after the village of Ferry Hinksey, now known as North Hinksey, on the other side of Hinksey Stream, one of the branches of the River Thames in Oxford. There was once a punt ferry that operated over Bulstake Stream.

The most notable path between Oxford and North Hinksey, a continuation of Ferry Hinksey Road, is a metalled bridleway and cycle track, variously known as Willow Walk and Ruskin's Ride. The latter is named after John Ruskin (1819–1900) who used to pass this way between Ferry Hinksey and Oxford, where he was the first Slade Professor of Fine Art from 1869. The path was originally built in 1876–77 by Aubrey Harcourt (1852–1904), a major local landowner, but was not made open to the public until 1922. There is also a smaller unmade path which begins alongside the large back garden of The Fishes and crosses Hinksey Stream by a bridge at the site of the old ferry, which linked Ferry Hinksey with Oxford. The ferry ceased operation in 1928. The various streams are now crossed by small bridges. A 'Ferry Cottage' still remains.

A poem called Ferry Hinksey by Laurence Binyon (1869–1943) describes the bucolic nature of the area before Osney Mead Industrial Estate was developed.

== Buildings and companies ==
Arup Associates designed the building for the Oxford Mail and Times in 1970–2. West Oxford Community Primary School, formerly West Oxford First School, is also located here. Holywell Press moved to Ferry Hinksey Road in 1989. Oxford Open Learning, a distance learning company, is at King's Meadow off Ferry Hinksey Road.

== Gallery ==
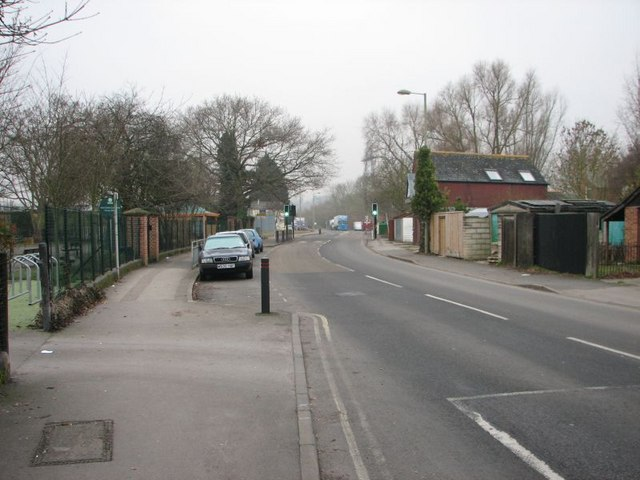
View of Ferry Hinksey Road

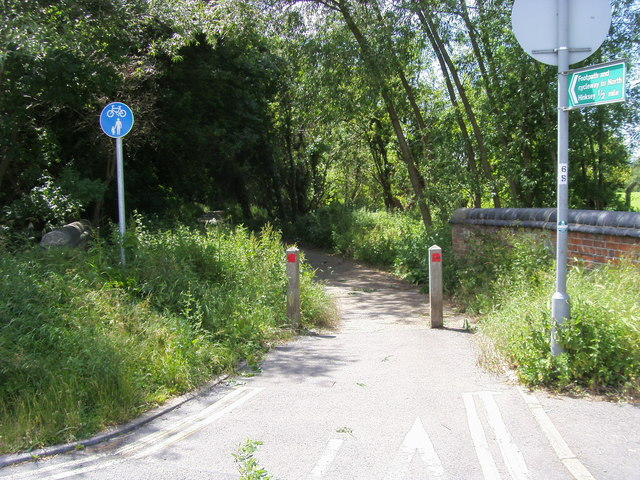
Footpath and cycleway to North Hinksey off Ferry Hinksey Road

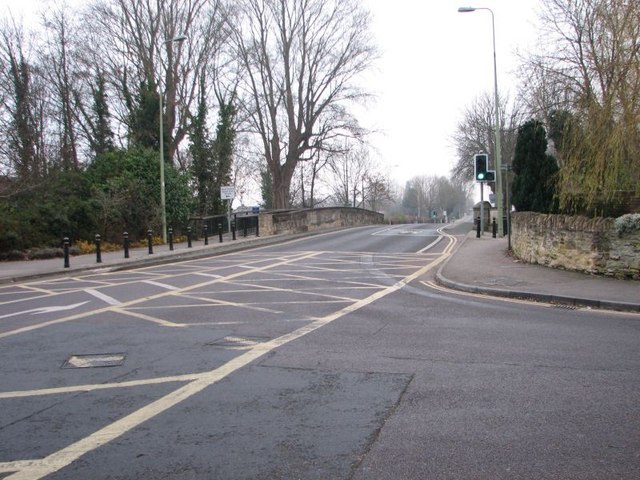
Bridge off Ferry Hinksey Road to the right

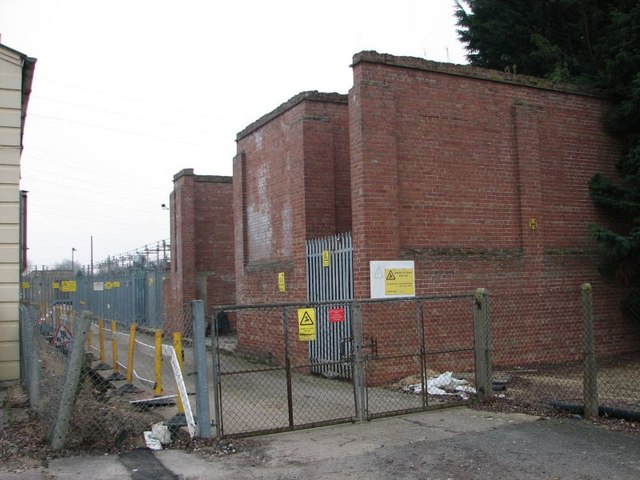
The large electrical substation on Ferry Hinksey Road

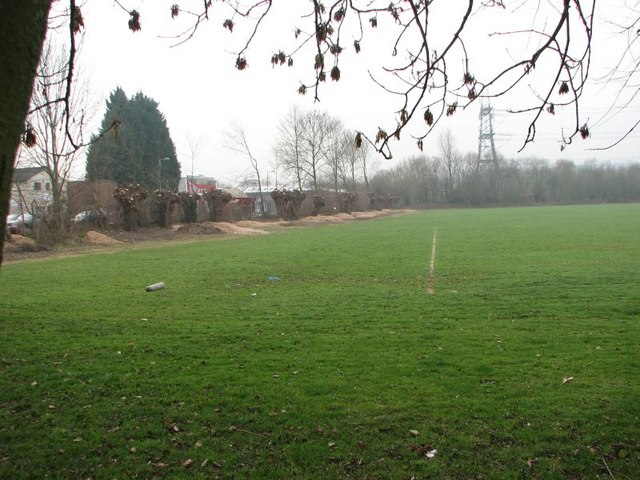
Pollarded willow trees along the edge of the playing fields by Ferry Hinksey Road

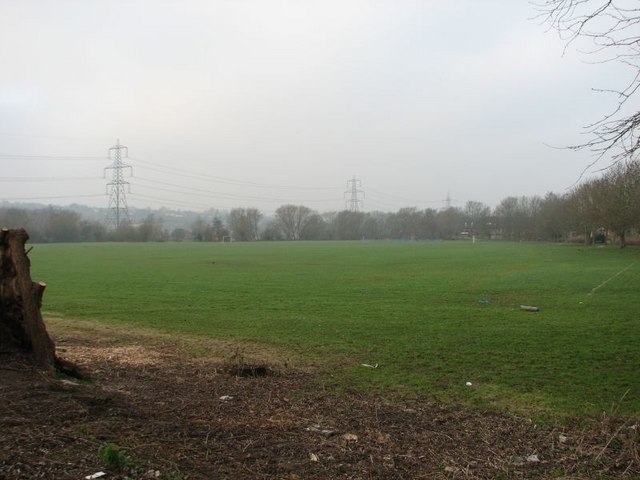
Sports field off Ferry Hinksey Road

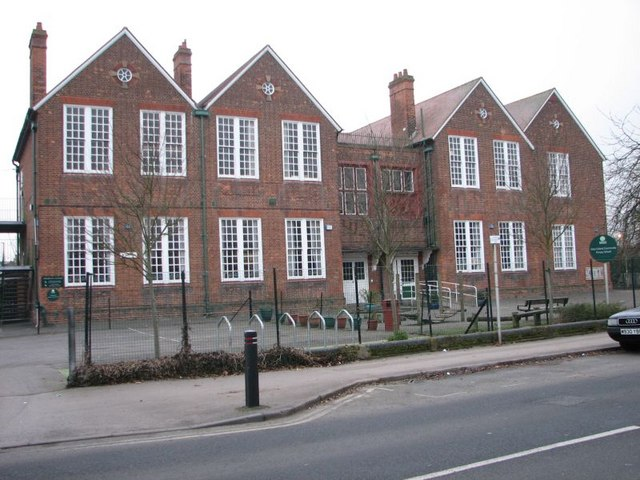
View of West Oxford Community Primary School

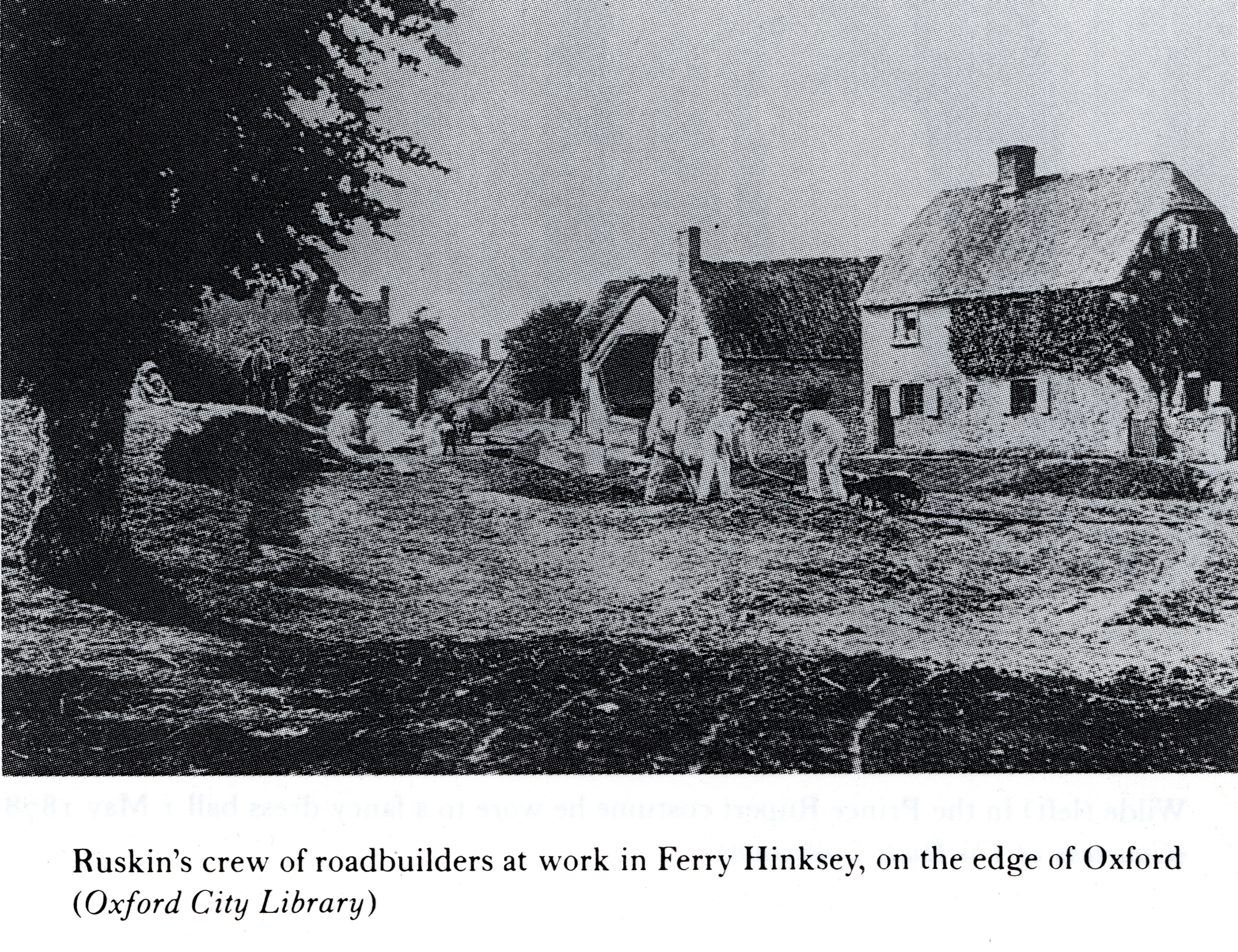
Ferry Hinksey late 1800s

== See also ==
- Ruskin's diggers at Ferry Hinksey (1874)
