= Osney Ditch =

Channel of the River Thames at Oxford, England

Coordinates: 51.75243°N 1.275391°W

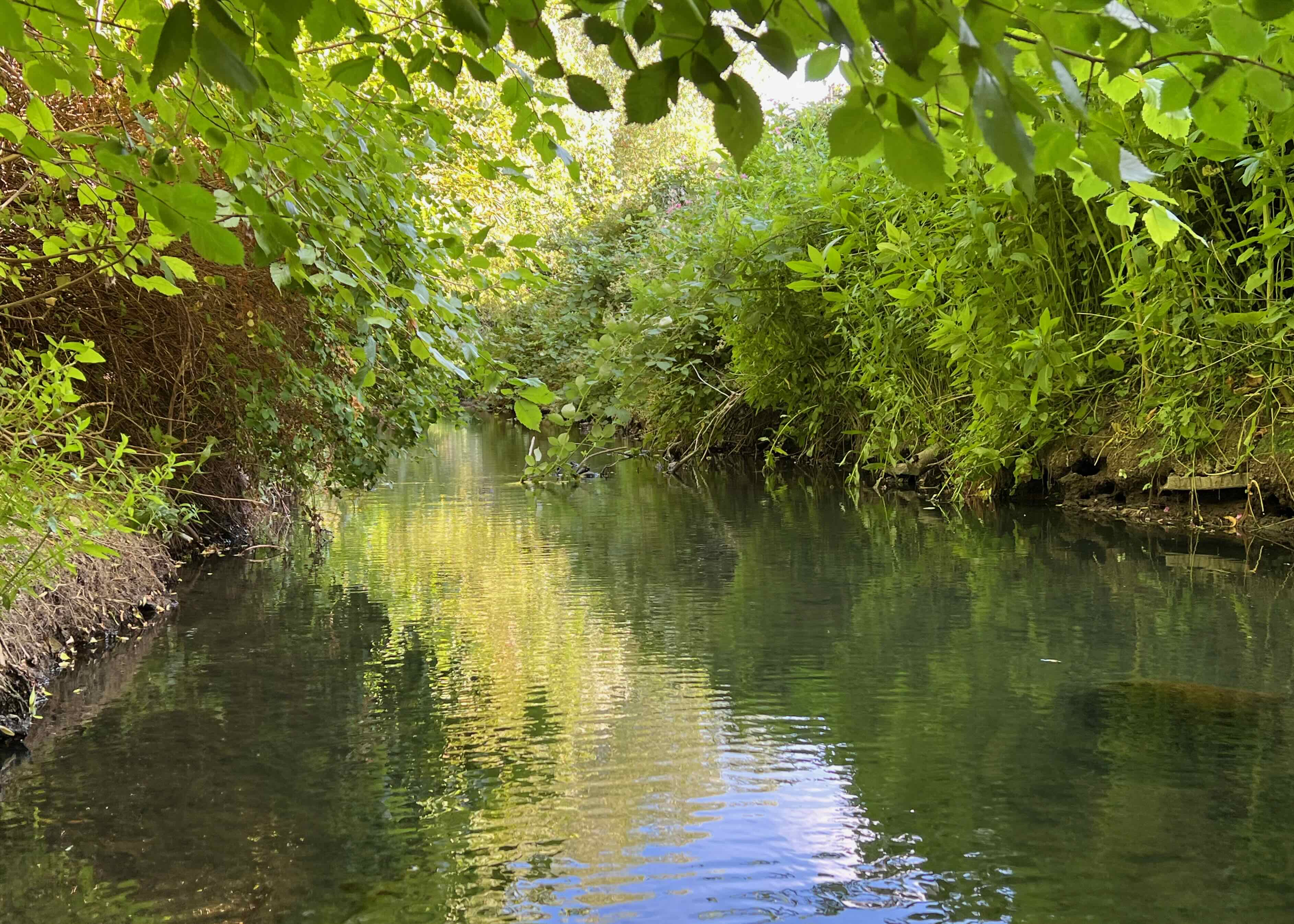
View of Osney Ditch

The Osney Ditch is a side channel of the River Thames at Oxford, England.

== Watercourse ==
It is one of the principal watercourses in west Oxford and forms part of the network of streams that surround Osney Island.

It leaves Bulstake Stream just east of Binsey Lane, near Tumbling Bay, a former bathing pool, and then joins the Osney Stream south of St Frideswide's Church; the church stands on a small island created by Osney Stream and Osney Ditch.

It flows under Botley Road and passes just to the west of St Frideswide's Church, south of Botley Road, and east of Ferry Hinksey Road, and forms the western side of Osney Island.

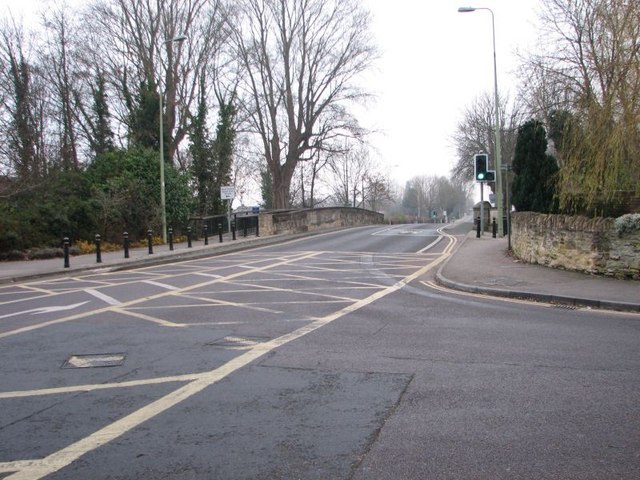
Osney Ditch Bridge on Botley Road, looking east from the junction with Ferry Hinksey Road.

== Osney Ditch Bridge ==
A notable historical structure along its course is Osney Ditch Bridge. This is a Grade II listed bridge which is also known as St Frideswide’s Bridge or Seven Arches Bridge. In medieval times there was a ford at this location which had been supplemented by a footbridge by the 17th century. This was widened in 1674 and by the 18th century it was replaced by a seven-arched stone bridge which now carries Botley Road over Osney Ditch.

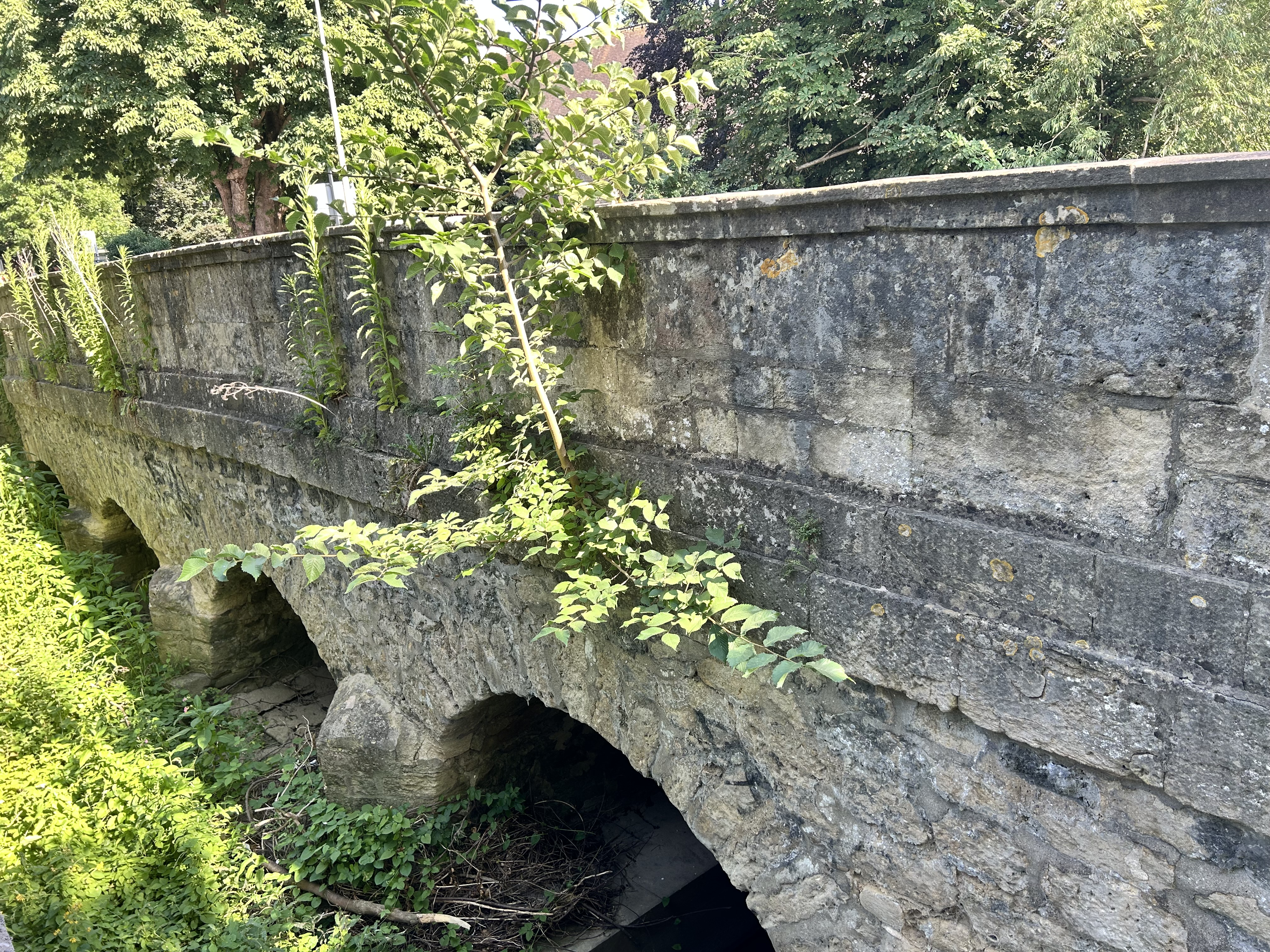
Osney Ditch Bridge showing arches

The east bank of Osney Ditch is lined by Osney’s 19th-century cottages and gardens, while the west bank faces Ferry Hinksey Road.

== Biodiversity ==
The slow-flowing, freshwater environment has sections of shaded and open banks lined with waterside trees, such as willows. Wetland plants, such as Yellow flag iris (Iris pseudacorus), reeds, sedges, and other hydrophilic plants form dense growth in shallower stretches, offering cover and stabilizing the banks.

The mixed habitat of open water and lush vegetation acts as a green corridor and supports a variety of wildlife in an urban setting. There is a high diversity of insect species which in turn sustain fish, birds, and bats.

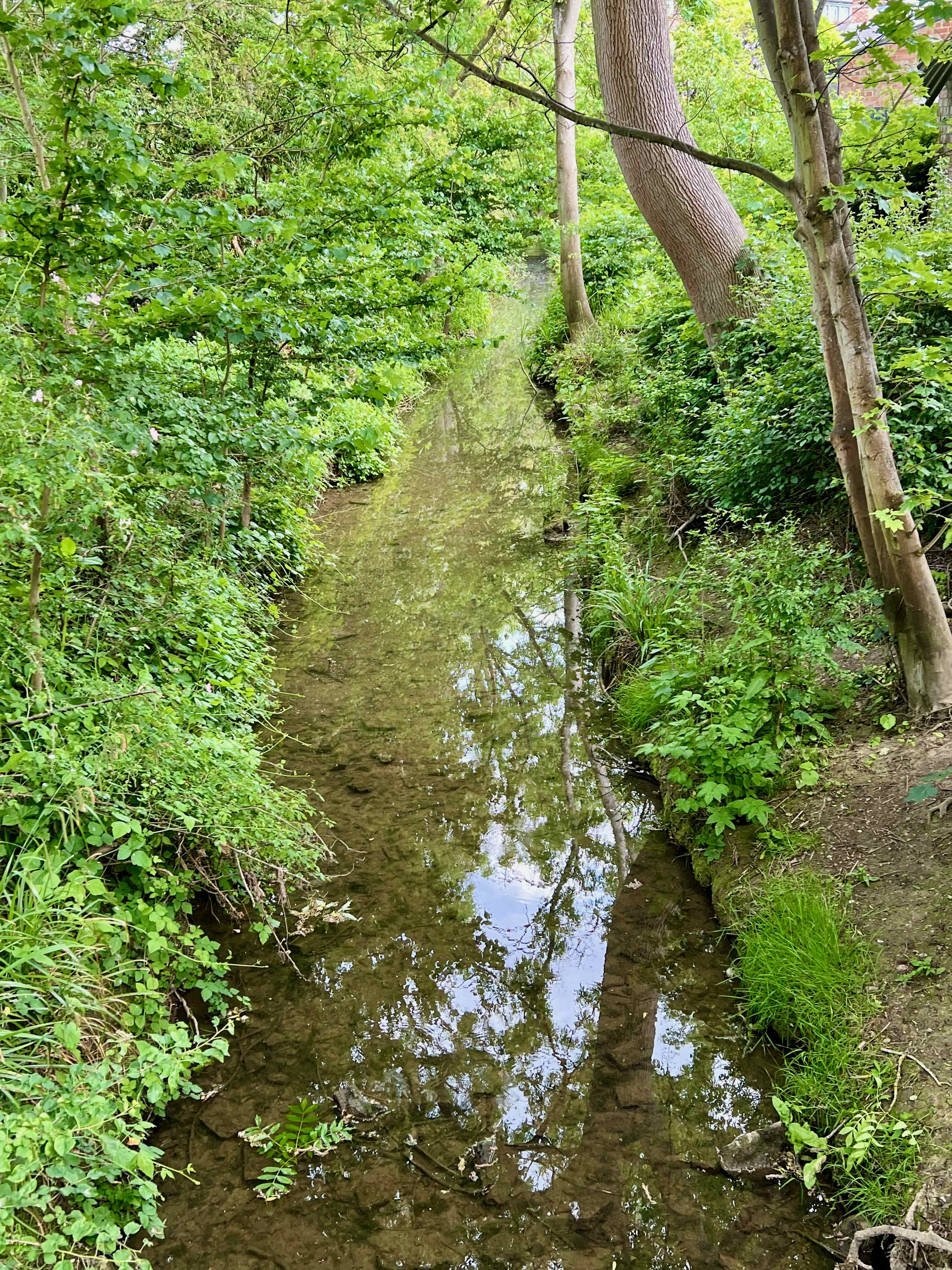
Osney Ditch North of Botley Road

Mayfly and caddisfly larvae inhabit cleaner sections of the stream bed while dragonflies and damselflies are commonly seen in summer months patrolling the water’s edge.

It is an important breeding ground for common fish such as chub (Leuciscus cephalus) and the watercourse attracts Kingfishers and the occasional otter, indicating good water quality and habitat connectivity.

Local residents frequently see badgers and muntjac deer roaming along the banks of the stream.

== Community activity ==
Local residents and groups remain actively involved in the stewardship of Osney Ditch. The Osney Island Residents’ Association shares information on wildlife sightings and promotes awareness of the ditch’s ecological value.

== See also ==
- Tributaries of the River Thames

Next confluence upstream	River Thames	Next confluence downstream
Sheepwash Channel (north)	Osney Ditch	Bulstake Stream (south
