= Osney Rail Bridge =

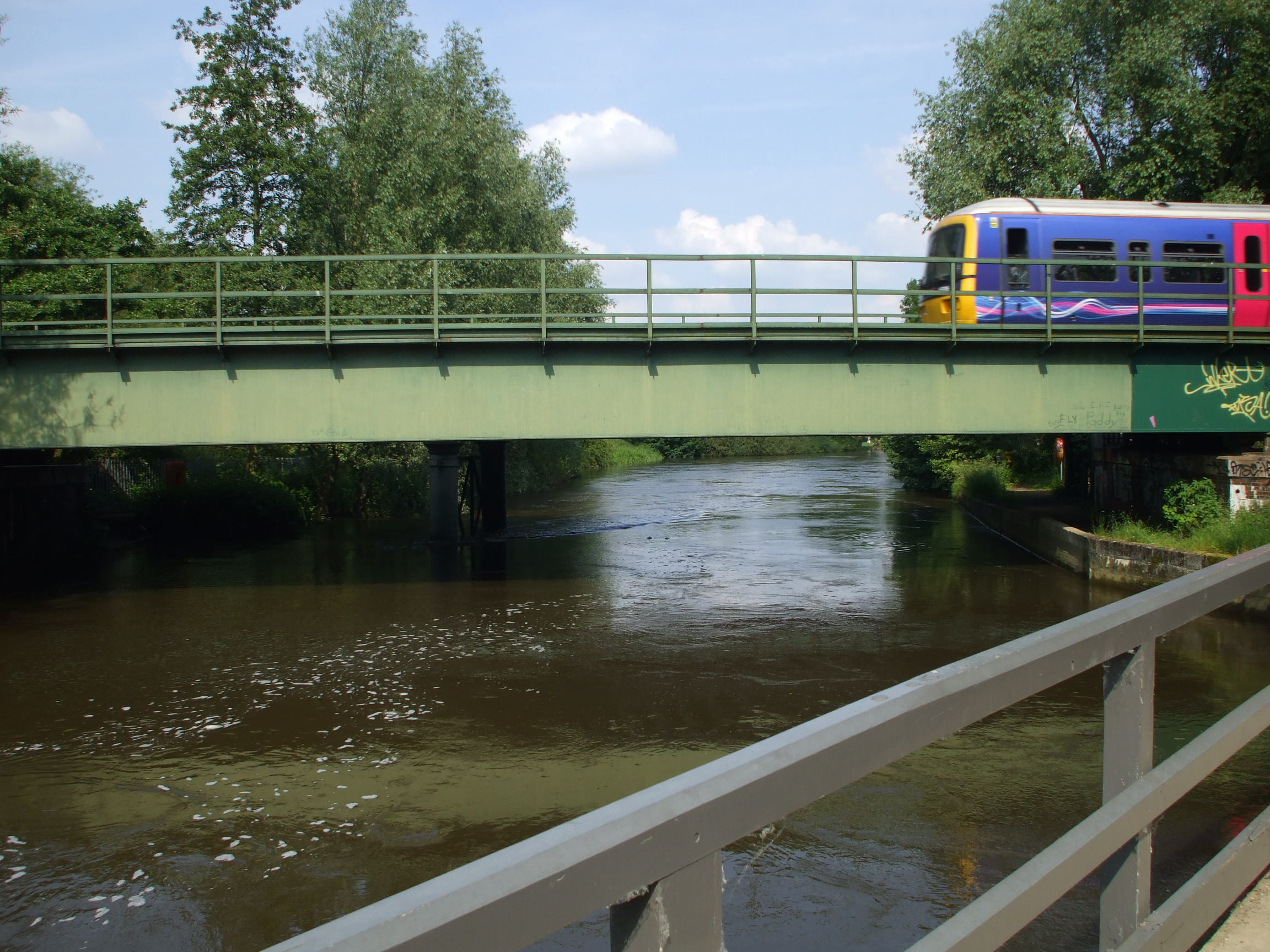
- Coordinates: 51.747218°N 1.267242°W
- Carries: Cherwell Valley Line
- Crosses: River Thames
- Locale: Oxford
- Maintained by: Network Rail

Characteristics
- Material: Iron
- Height: 11 feet 8 inches (3.56 m)

History
- Opened: 1887

Location
- Interactive map of Osney Rail Bridge

Osney Rail Bridge is a railway bridge over the River Thames at Oxford in England. It carries the Cherwell Valley Line between Didcot and Oxford across the river on the reach between Iffley Lock and Osney Lock.

The original bridge was built in 1850, when the Great Western Railway built a new line from its original Oxford station at Grandpont to Rugby. The north side of the bridge was on the island which was then called Osney. A second bridge was built in 1887 within a foot or so of the first bridge.

The bridge is maintained by Network Rail, who refer to the bridge as River Isis Crossing.

== See also ==
- Crossings of the River Thames

Next crossing upstream	River Thames	Next crossing downstream
Osney Bridge (road)	Osney Rail Bridge	Gasworks Bridge (pedestrian)
