= Bulstake Stream =

Stream in Oxfordshire, England

Coordinates: 51.7462°N 1.2675°W

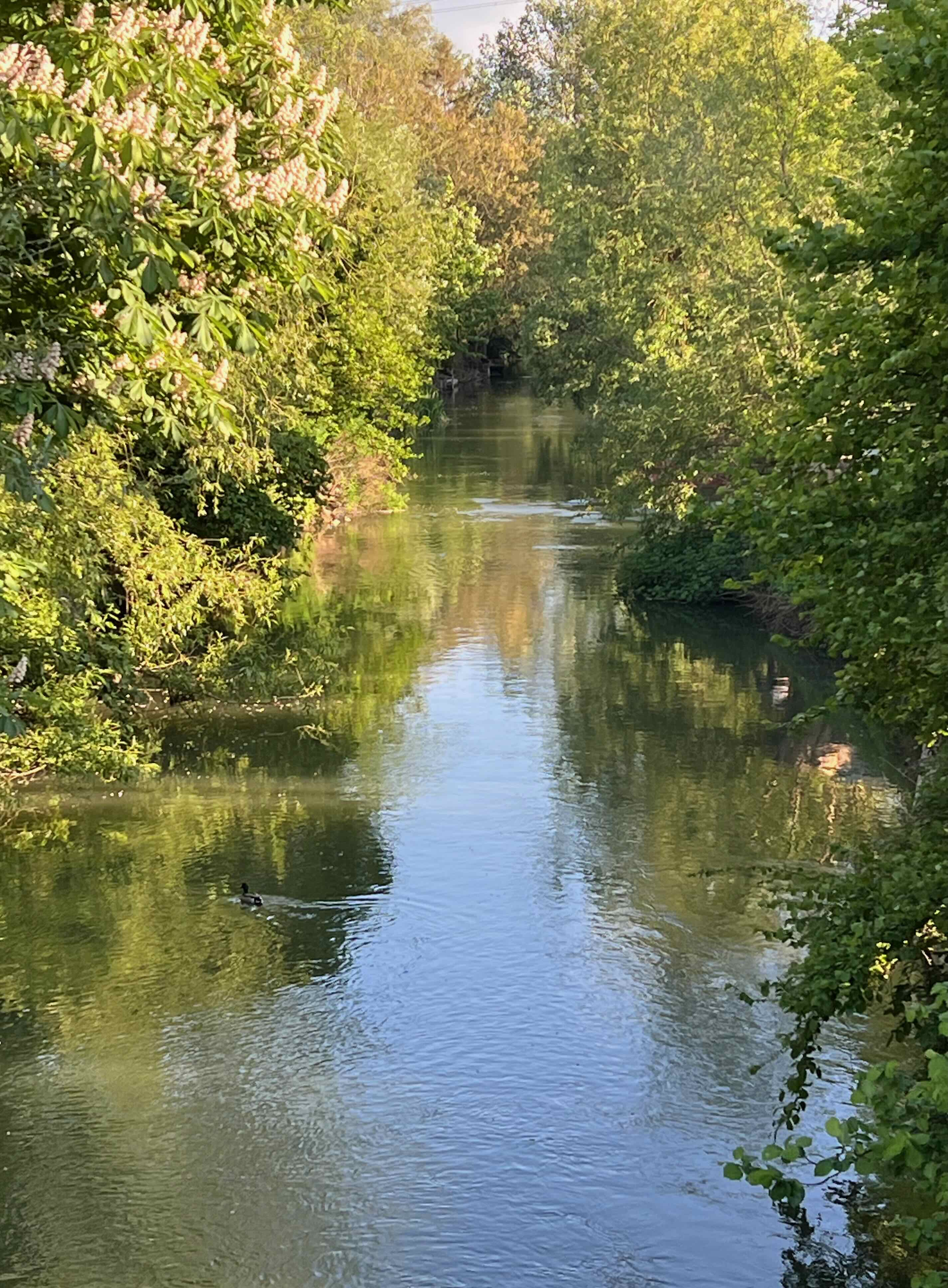
Bulstake Stream South of the Botley Road

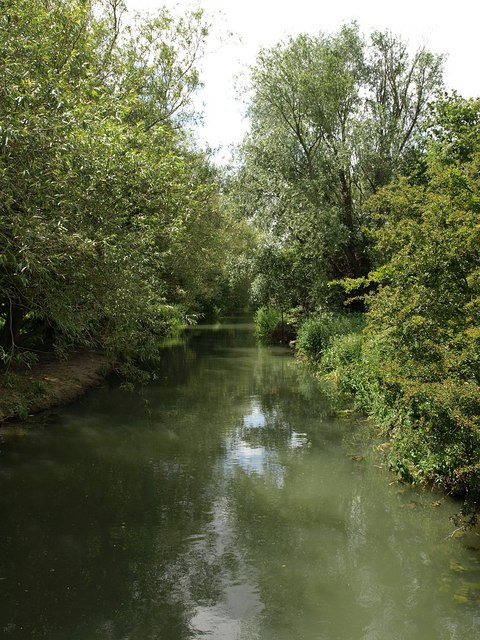
Another view of Bulstake Stream.

Bulstake Stream, also spelt Bullstake Stream, is a backwater of the River Thames at Oxford, England.

The stream leaves the main stream of the Thames at a river junction known as Four Rivers, at the south west corner of Fiddler's Island opposite Sheepwash Channel. It immediately flows past Tumbling Bay, which had a bathing place in use from 1853 to 1990, when the toilets and huts were removed. The pool is still in occasional use, though in disrepair. A fish race was added to bypass the bathing place and was completed by 2020. The Osney Ditch flows out of the stream southeast towards Osney. The stream follows a semi-circular course, west and then south, passing under bridges on Binsey Lane and Botley Road (Bulstake Bridge) to a confluence with Seacourt/Hinksey Stream near North Hinksey. It resumes, east, past Osney Mead Industrial Estate, and rejoins the Thames at the Osney Rail Bridge. The Thames Path crosses the stream on a bridge known as Boney's Bridge. Botley Stream flows into it from Seacourt Stream just north of Botley Road.

The lower part (resumption) is also known as Potts Stream or Pot Stream.

Until 1790, the stream was the main navigation channel of the Thames. It became a backwater when Osney Lock was opened.

Next confluence upstream	River Thames	Next confluence downstream
Dukes Cut (north)	Bulstake Stream	Castle Mill Stream (north)
