= St Frideswide's Church =

Coordinates: 51.752131°N 1.274865°W

- The Parish Church of St Frideswide
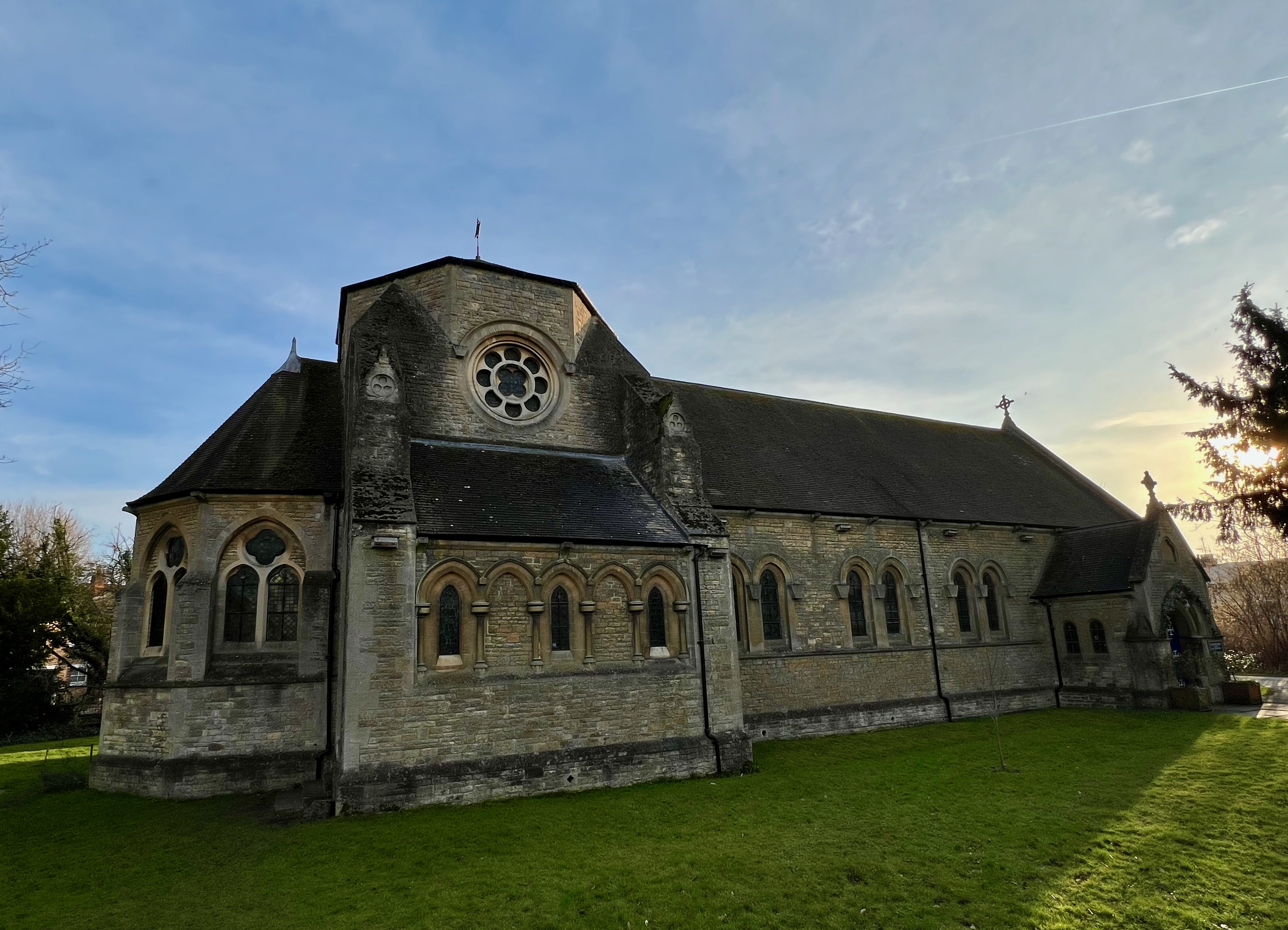
- St Frideswide's Church, from the North
- St Frideswide's Church
- OS grid reference: SP 50154 06191
- Country: England
- Denomination: Church of England
- Churchmanship: Anglo-Catholic
- Website: St Frideswide's Church

History
- Consecrated: 10 April 1872

Architecture
- Architect: Samuel Sanders Teulon
- Style: Gothic Revival
- Years built: 1870–2

Administration
- Diocese: Oxford

Clergy
- Vicar: Revd Clare Sykes

St Frideswide's Church is a Church of England church on the south side of the Botley Road in the New Osney area of Oxford, England.

It was built in 1870–72 and dedicated to St Frideswide, the patron saint of Oxford. St Frideswide’s Church is a Grade II* listed building, recognized for its "unusually powerful design".

== History ==
By the late 1860s plans had been made to build a dedicated church for the population of Osney Town (now New Osney). Christ Church College, which held the advowson of St Thomas’s parish, provided a triangular site known as “Mrs Jones’s Field” north-west of Osney Island. The architect Samuel Sanders Teulon was commissioned to design the new church.

The foundation stone was laid on 13 December 1870 by John Talbot, MP, at a public ceremony. It was built by the local firm of Honour & Castle and it was originally intended for the church tower to have a spire. On 10 April 1872 the church was consecrated for worship by the Bishop of Oxford, John Mackarness. The new parish of St Frideswide’s was thereby established, carved out of St Thomas the Martyr parish to serve the Osney and Botley Road district.

The church is dedicated to the patroness of Oxford, St Frideswide. This unusual choice was influenced by Christ Church’s historical connection to St Frideswide’s Priory, the site of which became Christ Church Cathedral. Under its first vicar, Rev. George Lynch Kemp (who served from 1872 to 1896), the parish developed a strong identity with its roots in the Oxford Movement.

The church also ran a parish school and various social activities for the predominantly railway and artisan families of the area.

St Frideswide’s Church saw gradual enhancements and continued active use throughout the 20th century. In the early 1900s the chancel was embellished: a carved oak reredos (altar screen) was installed in 1906 and the east window was filled with stained glass. A set of five stained-glass windows by artist Geoffrey Webb, depicting the Easter story, was added in 1931.

During World War II the church building survived the bombing raids on Oxford unscathed. In 1950 fourteen carved wooden angels were acquired and mounted on the nave walls, adding to the interior decoration.

St Frideswide’s Church has played a continuous role in the religious and social life of its neighbourhood since the 19th century. Music is an important part of the services. Worship at St Frideswide’s centres on two main services on Sundays: the Holy Communion early in the morning follows the traditional Book of Common Prayer and the Eucharist later follows a more contemporary service with music. St Frideswide's stands in the Anglo-Catholic tradition of the Church of England.

== Architecture and design ==
St Frideswide’s is an example of high Victorian church architecture, notable for its bold and individualistic design by S. S. Teulon. The church is constructed of coursed limestone rubble with ashlar (dressed stone) detailing.

Teulon’s original design was in a Gothic Revival idiom but with some Romanesque influence evident in its heavy massing and round-arched elements. The church features a crossing tower over the north transept. On one corner of the tower rises a slender octagonal turret, which contains a single bell (cast in 1871 by Warner of London). The west front of the church is richly treated, with strong buttresses and a large traceried window.

The overall exterior design is regarded as one of Teulon’s most powerful and unconventional church designs, now protected by a Grade II* listing for its architectural interest.

A notable element is the rose window: Teulon incorporated a “magnificent rose window of large dimensions” in the upper wall of the north transept, providing light into the crossing. Other notable interior features include a pipe organ by Hunter, which remains in use in the organ loft, and a set of fourteen painted wooden angel figures that hang from the nave walls.

== The Vicarage at the Church of St Frideswide ==
The vicarage is a notable building in its own right. Owing to its architectural interest St Frideswide’s vicarage is Grade II listed.

The vicarage was designed by English architect Harry George Walter Drinkwater of Oxford in 1876.

Architecturally the vicarage complements the church with similar materials and Victorian Gothic styling. It is a two-storey house constructed of the same grey Oxford limestone with ashlar trim as the church. The vicarage is linked to the north side of the church by a short covered passage or cloister.

Notable features of the vicarage include mullioned windows with stone surrounds, gabled roofs covered in tiles and tall stone chimneys, which give the vicarage a picturesque Cotswolds cottage character. In the 21st century the old vicarage building has been extensively restored. A portion of the large rear garden (formerly the vicar’s orchard) and part of the vicarage sold off and converted into a separate private dwelling. Henry Hardy, editor of the writings of philosopher-historian Sir Isaiah Berlin, lived for a decade in the vicarage of St Frideswide’s.

Together the church and its vicarage form a historic ensemble along Botley Road, embodying the 19th-century vision of a parish church and its clerical house side by side.

== Popular culture ==
The name of the church is used for the setting of a Morse detective story, Service of All the Dead, by Colin Dexter. However the location of the church in that story is thought to correspond to St Mary Magdalen in the centre of Oxford.

In the nave is the "Alice Door". This was long thought to have been carved by Alice Liddell. Alice Liddell was the inspiration for Lewis Carroll's Alice's Adventures in Wonderland. She was the daughter of Henry Liddell, the Dean of Christ Church, Oxford. But recent (2022) research has shown that the carvings were the work of her younger sisters, Rhoda and Violet Liddell. The top panel depicts St Frideswide travelling in a boat on the river near Binsey.

== Location ==
St Frideswide’s Church is set back from the Botley Road, a short distance from the railway station and the city centre. The church lies between two rivers: the River Thames to the east and the Osney Ditch to the west.

== Vicars of St Frideswide's ==
- 1872-96 George Lynch Kemp
- 1896-1905 Augustus Jameson Miller
- 1905-14 William Alfred Spence
- 1914-22 George Herbert Tremenheere
- 1922-33 Charles Overy
- 1933-76 Arnold Mallinson

== Gallery ==
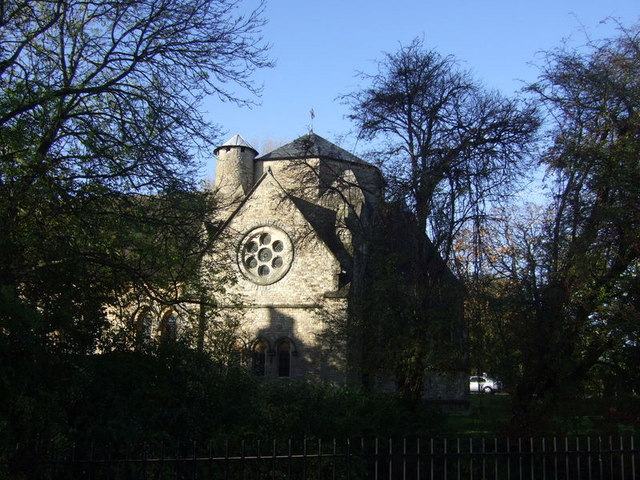
View of the church from the south

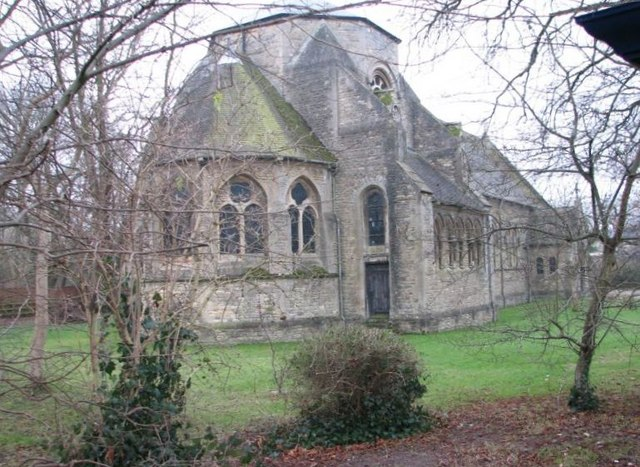
View from the northeast

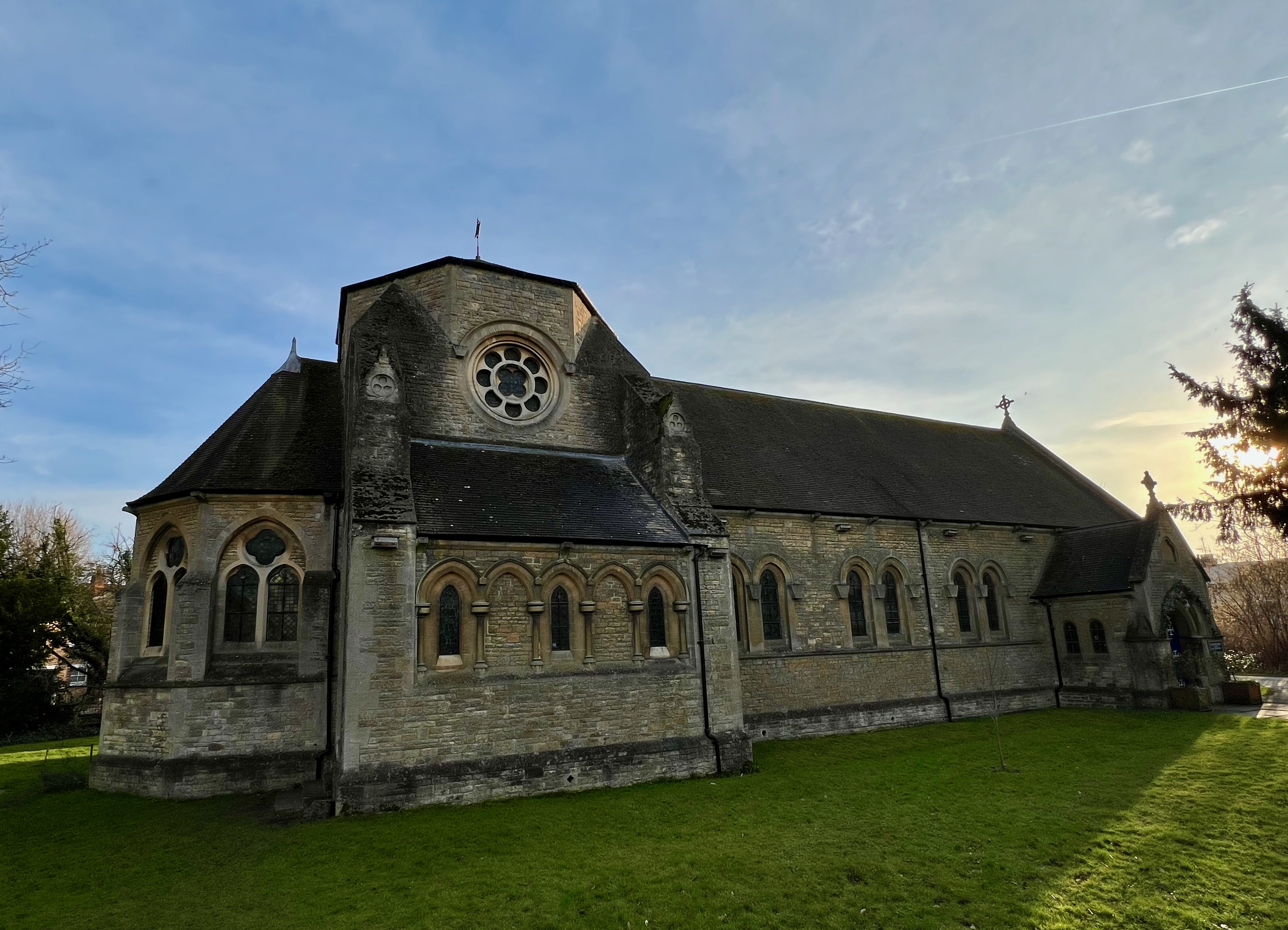
St Frideswide's Church on a winter's day

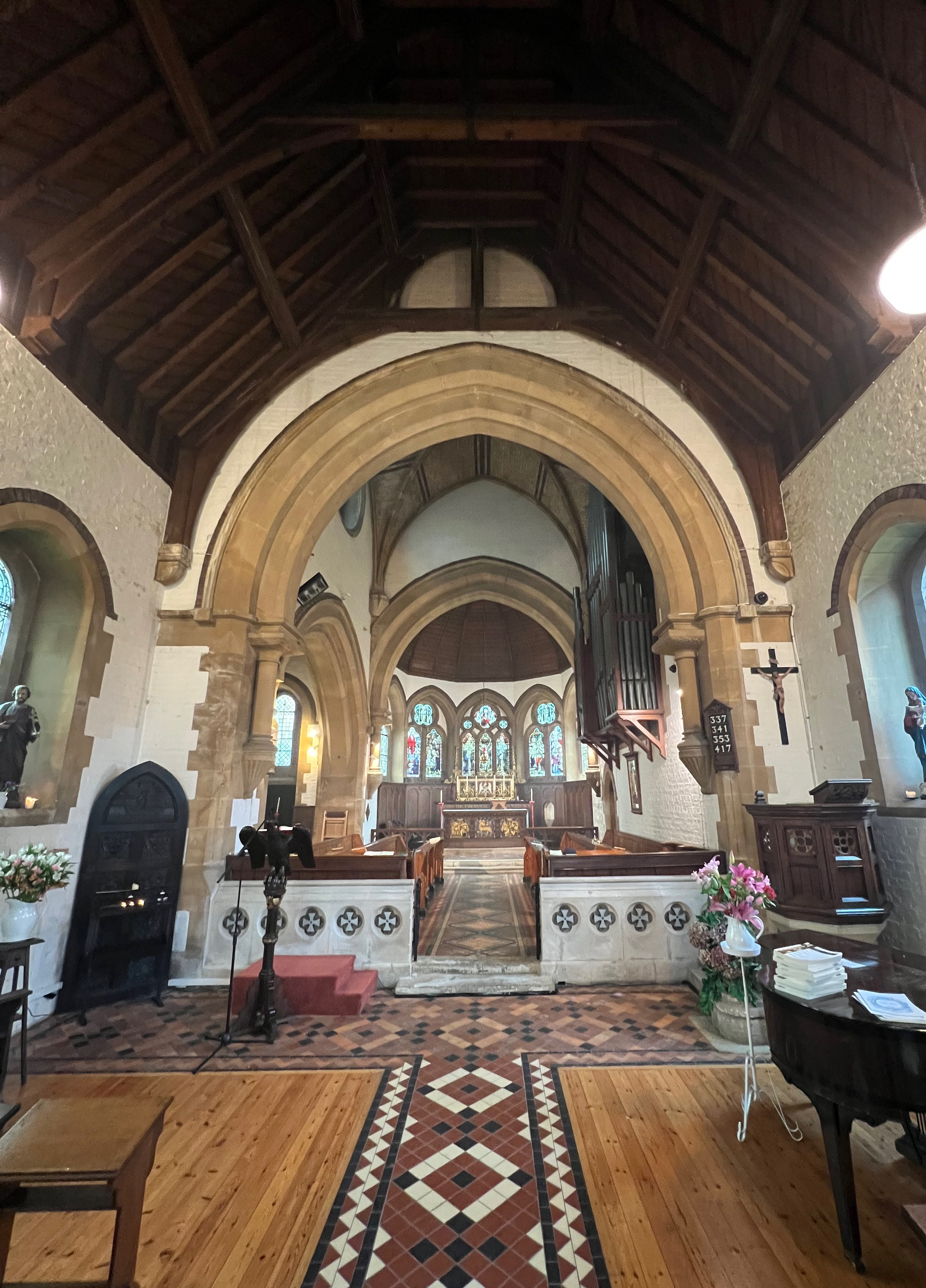
The interior of St Frideswide's Church

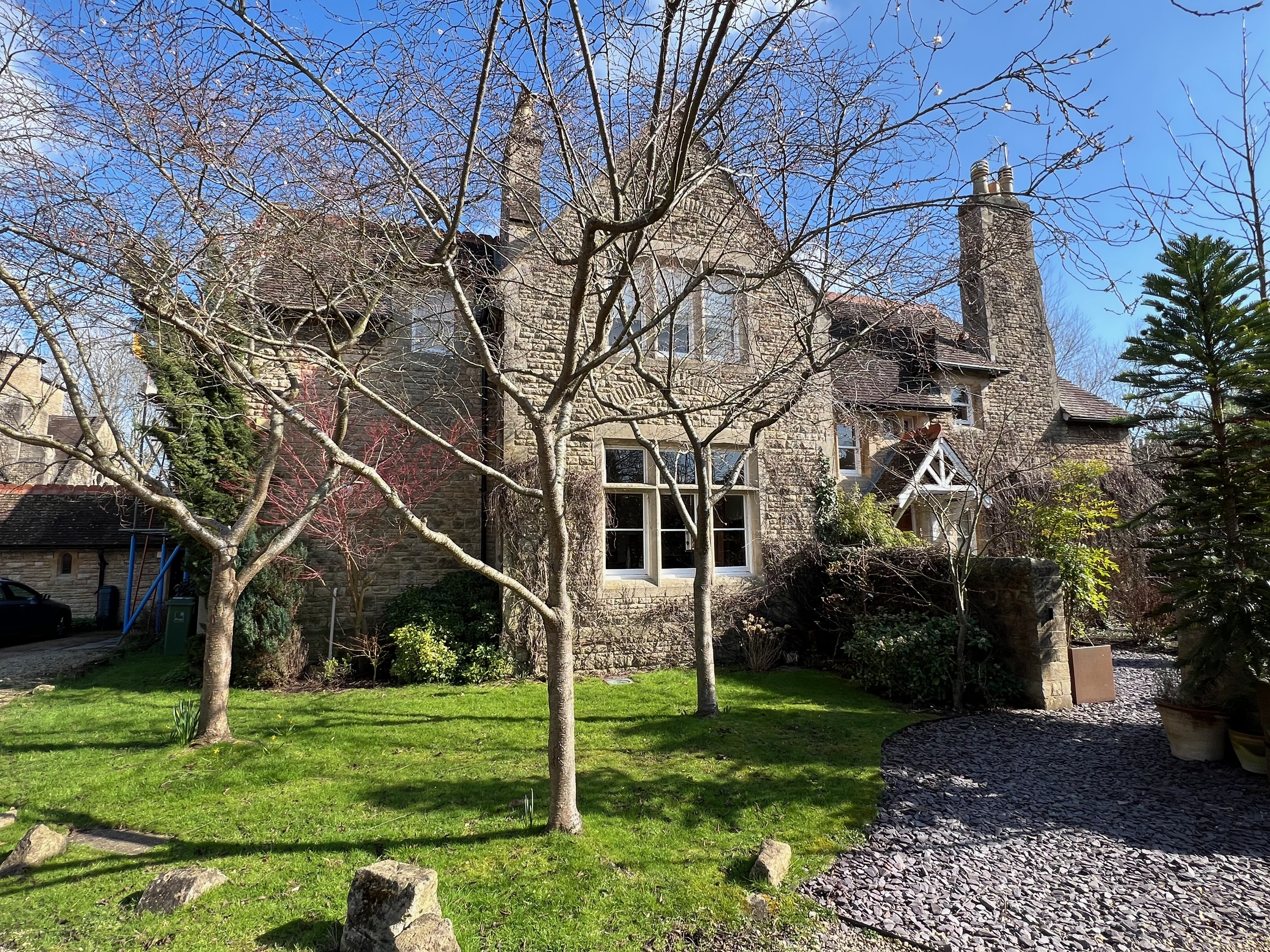
The Vicarage of St Frideswide's

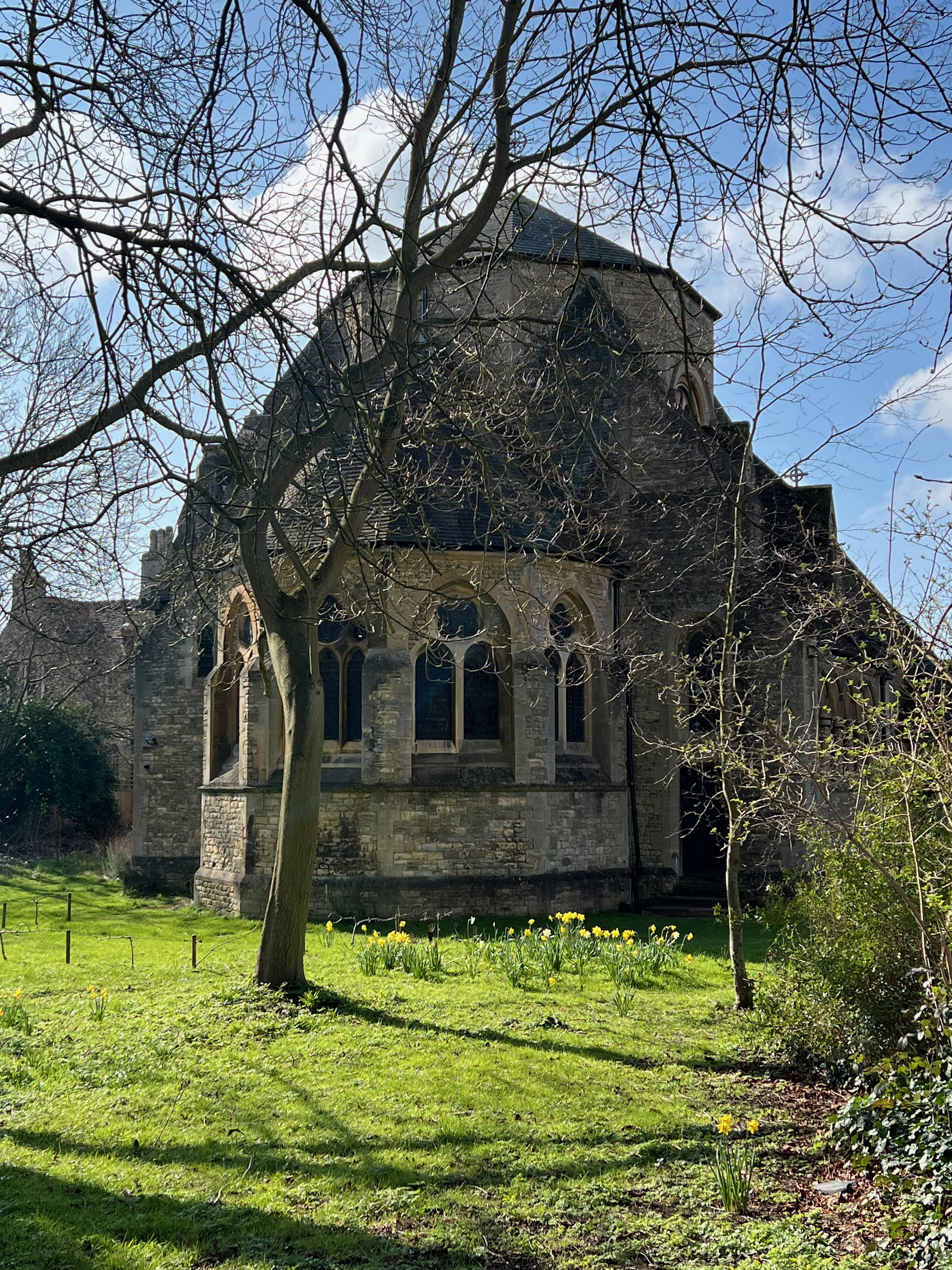
St Frideswide's Church, viewed from the East

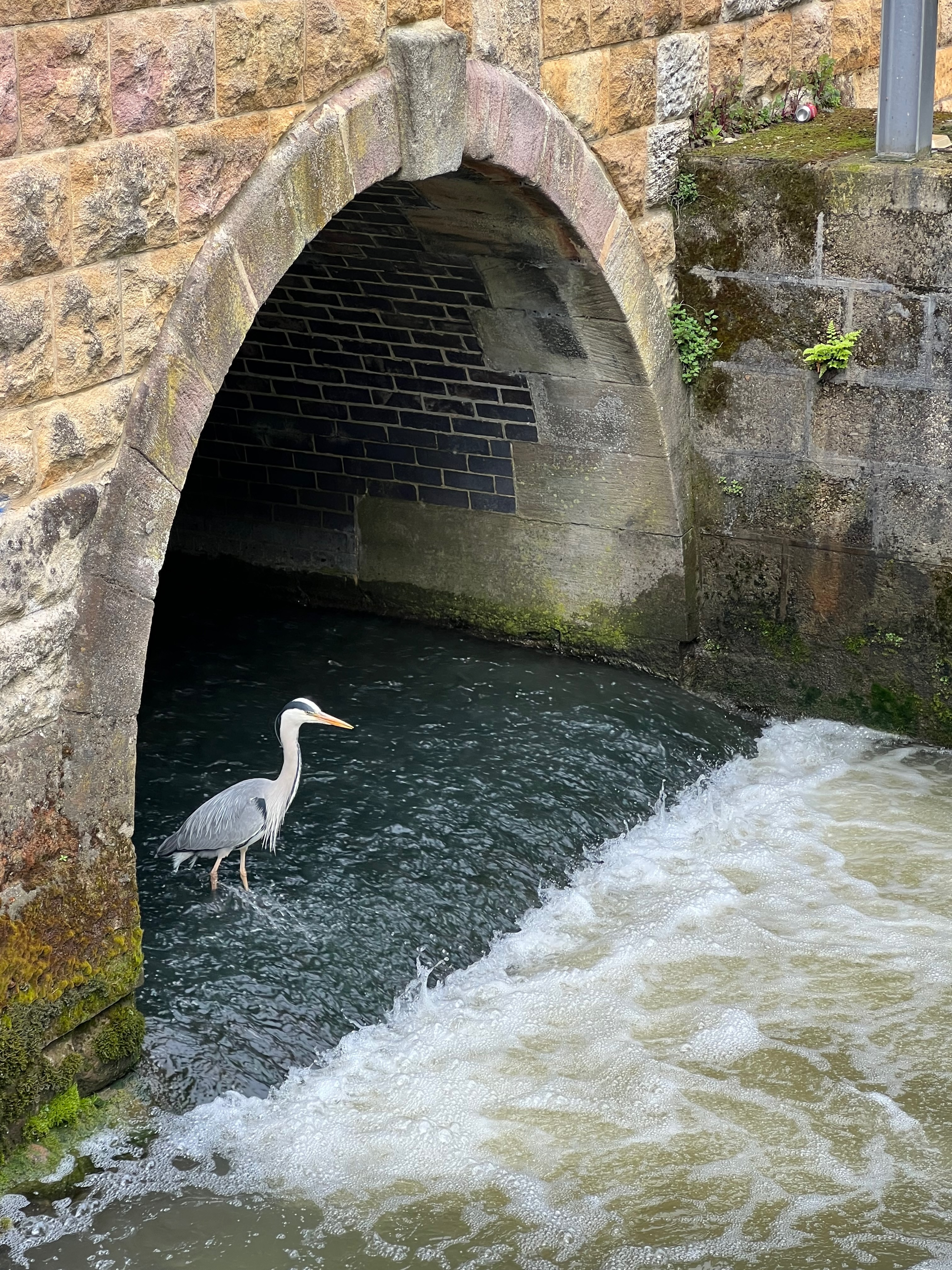
Grey Heron on the Thames next to St Frideswide's Church

== See also ==
- Priory of St Frideswide, Oxford
- St Thomas the Martyr's Church, Oxford
- The original plan by S. S. Teulon
