= Botley Road =

Road in Oxford, England

Coordinates: 51.7526°N 1.2824°W

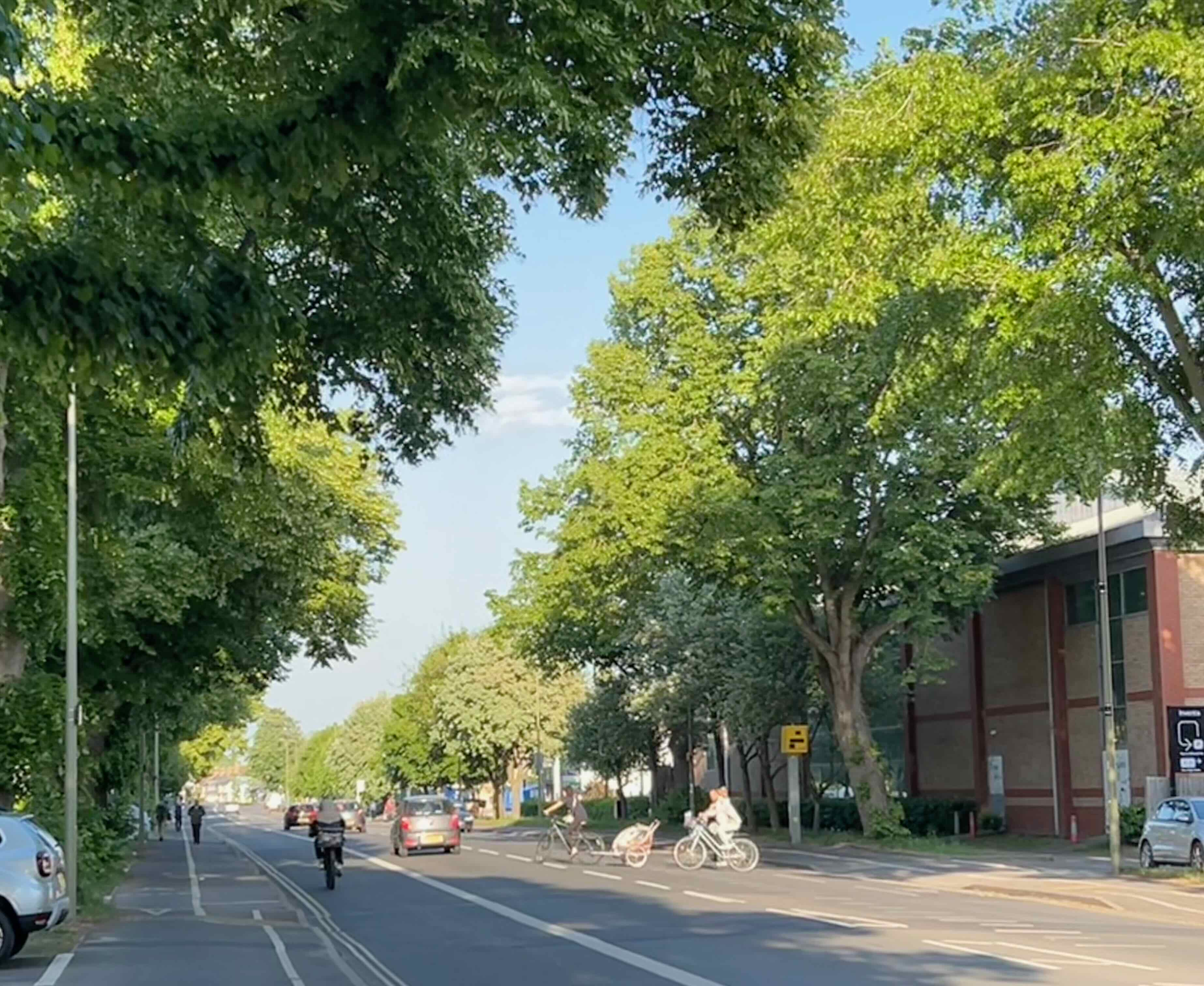
The Botley Road in 2025

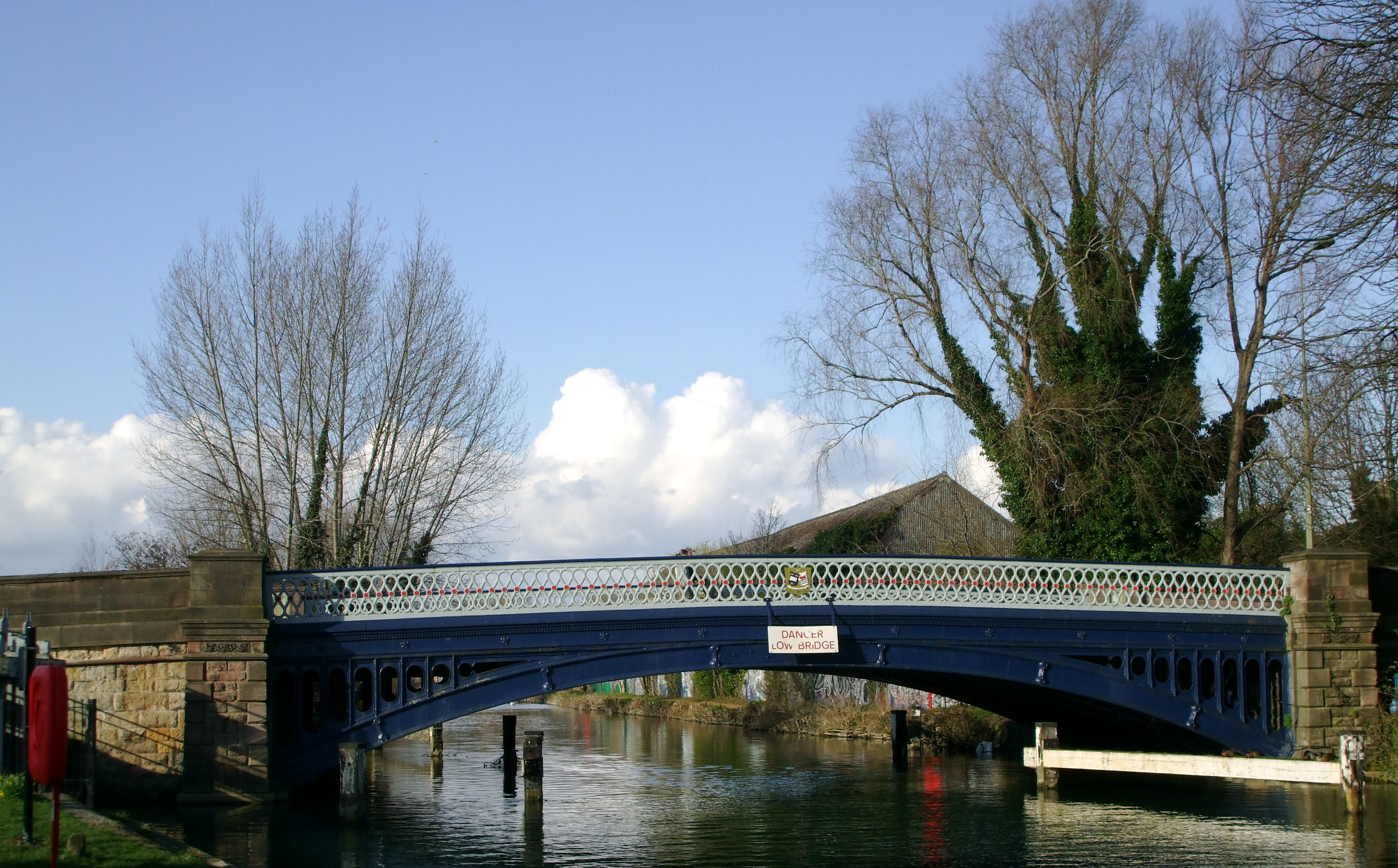
Osney Bridge, which carries the Botley Road, looking north from Osney Island

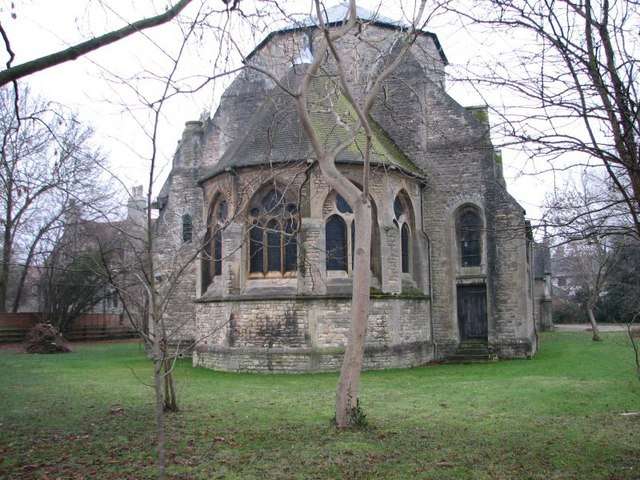
St Frideswide's Church on Botley Road

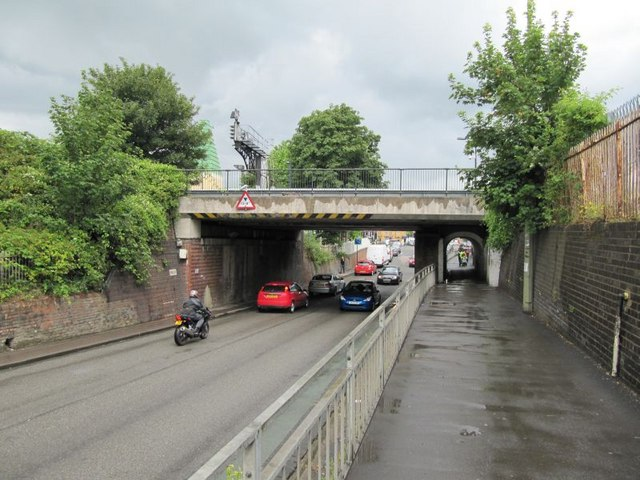
The railway bridge at the eastern end of the Botley Road

Botley Road is the main road into the centre of Oxford, England from the west. It stretches between Botley, on the Oxford Ring Road (A34) to the west of the city, and Frideswide Square at the junction with Oxford railway station, close to central Oxford.

== Overview ==
The Botley Road was known as the Botley Turnpike Road in the 18th century and Seven Bridges Road in the 19th century. Until the early 19th century it was little more than a track and highwaymen were a problem.

The road passes Osney. Out-of-town retail stores line the route. The road is designated as the A420. It becomes West Way at Botley Bridge over Seacourt Stream to the west. To the east, past the station, it becomes Park End Street. Oxpens Road leads off to the south at this junction. Along its route are several bridges — west to east: Botley Bridge, Bulstake Bridge, Osney Ditch Bridge, and Osney Bridge — as it passes over various sidechannels and the main branch of the River Thames.

Side streets, as well as most of the road between the railway station and the Beaumont veterinary practice, are mostly residential, and are flanked by two large parks (Botley Park, adjacent to West Oxford Community Centre, and Oatlands Park, near the Osney Mead industrial estate). The Botley Road is an important bus and commuter route to Oxford, and Seacourt Park and Ride is located near the junction with the A34.

Eastbound, it has a bus lane from the ring road until just before Osney Island, at which point there is a set of bus advancement traffic lights. It has cycle lanes in both directions. South from the eastern end, via Mill Street, are the site of Osney Abbey (now destroyed), Osney Cemetery (established 1848), Osney Lock, Osney Mill, and Osney Mill Marina.

== Closure for station development ==
In October 2022, Network Rail said that Botley Road was likely to be closed at the railway station for the whole of 2023. In December 2022, Network Rail said they were looking at how to reduce the impact of the work on the local community and that they did not need to start the full closure of Botley Road in January 2023. Under revised plans announced by Network Rail in March 2023, Botley Road is closed at the railway bridge from 11 April 2023 to allow utility services to divert their infrastructure under the bridge and undertake other enabling work. The road was due to reopen from October 2023 to spring 2024 before closing again for the bridge to be replaced. In September 2023, Network Rail said that, because of delays, it would remain closed until the work is completed in October 2024. However, in July 2024, further delays, blamed on the complex layout of utility pipes, meant that the road did not reopen in October. In January 2025, Network Rail announced a new target date of August 2026 for the reopening, two years after the original planned completion date. However, this was pushed back further to 20 September 2026 due to the discovery of minor gas leaks and the road finally reopened on that date.

== Development ==
From the railway station:

- Roads on the north side: Rodger Dudman Way, Cripley Road, Abbey Road, Henry Road, Helen Road, Binsey Lane (leading to Binsey), Prestwich Place, Osney Court and Bullstake Court.
- Roads on the south Side: Mill Street, Bridge Street (leading to Osney Island), Ferry Hinksey Road (leading to the Osney Mead industrial estate), Hill View Road, Alexandra Road, Oatlands Road, Harley Road, Riverside Road, Duke Street, Earl Street, Lamarsh Road, North Hinksey Lane.

The development of roads between Osney Island and Bullstake Stream started in the 1890s. Oatlands Meadow, owned by Morrell's Trustees, was first advertised in 1894. Thomas Gable, an Oxford publican, laid out Hill View Road in 1895, providing plots for others to develop. Thomas Gable died later that year and Kingerlee builders bought the unsold plots along the rest of Hill View Road. In 1901 they gained permission for a building estate extending from Alexandra Road to Riverside Road. The firm also acquired consent to develop the land north of Botley Road, and laid out Henry Road and Helen Road (named after Thomas Henry Kingerlee's eldest children) and part of Binsey Lane in 1902. Harley Road and Riverside Road were laid out in 1919, and built in the following few years.

== Quotations ==
Author and Oxford scholar C. S. Lewis mentions the road to Botley comically in his autobiography. Describing his first-ever arrival in Oxford as a young student, he writes:

"I sallied out of the railway station on foot to find either a lodging-house or a cheap hotel; all agog for dreaming spires and last enchantments. My first disappointment at what I saw could be dealt with. Towns always show their worst face to the railway. But as I walked on and on I became more bewildered. Could this succession of mean shops really be Oxford? But I still went on, always expecting the next turn to reveal the beauties, and reflecting that it was a much larger town than I had been led to suppose. Only when it became obvious that there was very little town left ahead of me, that I was in fact getting to open country, did I turn round and look. There behind me, far away, never more beautiful since, was the fabled cluster of spires and towers. I had come out of the station on the wrong side and been all this time walking into what was even then the mean and sprawling suburb of Botley."

Crime novelist Colin Dexter writes:

"Beginning its life under a low (Head Room 12ft) railway bridge, and proceeding its cramped and narrow way for several hundred yards past shabby rows of terraced houses that line the thoroughfare in tight and mean confinement, the Botley Road gradually broadens into a spacious stretch of dual carriageway that carries all west-bound traffic towards Faringdon, Swindon and the sundry hamlets in between. Here the houses no longer shoulder their neighbours in such grudging proximity, and hither several of the Oxford businessmen have brought their premises."

== See also ==
- Ferry Hinksey Road, south off Botley Road
- Tumbling Bay, bathing area near Botley Park
