= Osney =

Coordinates: 51.752°N 1.274°W

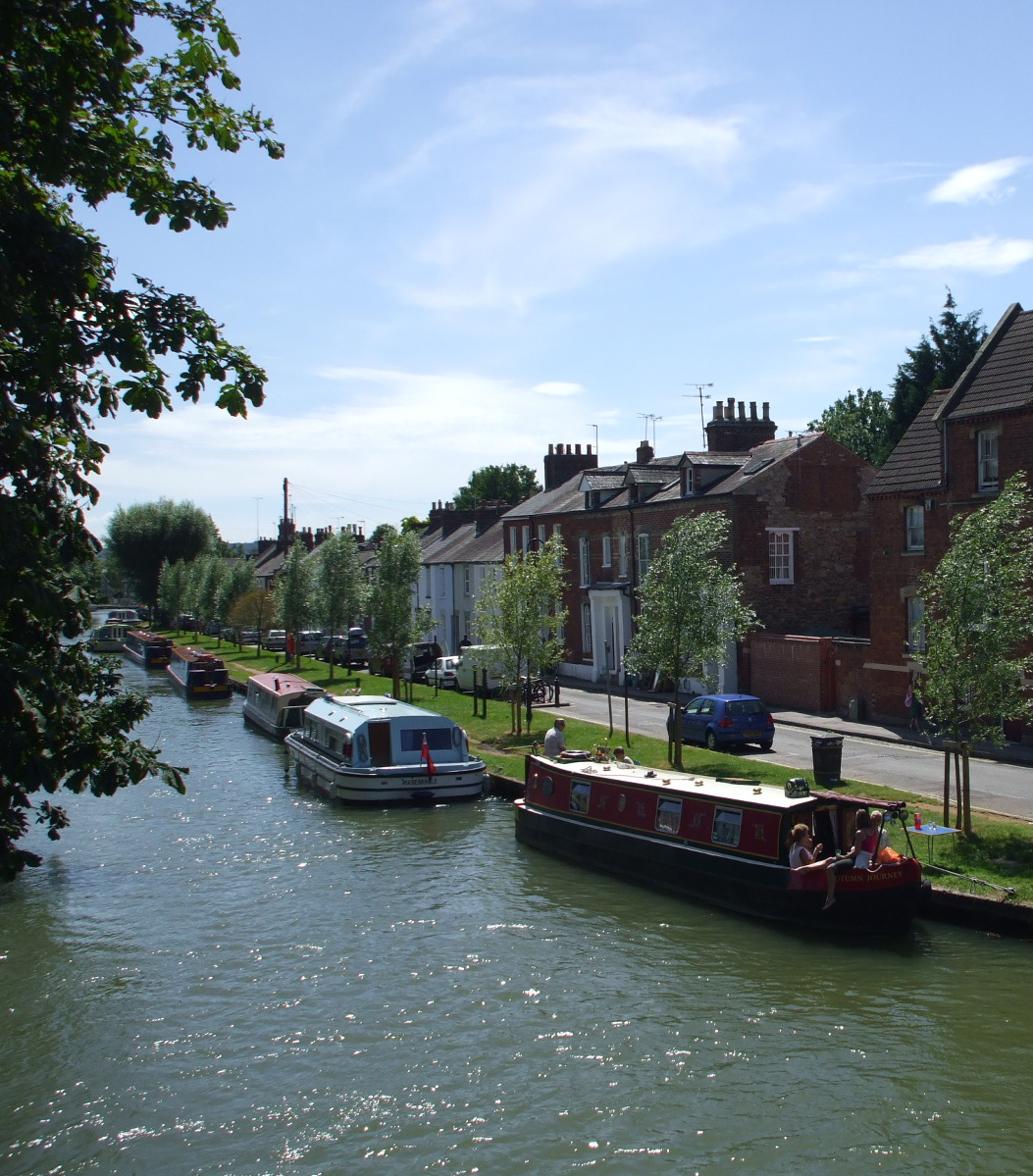
- East Street, Osney Island viewed from Osney Bridge

- Location within Oxfordshire
- OS grid reference: SP502060
- Civil parish: unparished
- District: Oxford
- Shire county: Oxfordshire
- Region: South East
- Country: England
- Sovereign state: United Kingdom
- Post town: Oxford
- Postcode district: OX1
- Dialling code: 01865
- Police: Thames Valley
- Fire: Oxfordshire
- Ambulance: South Central
- UK Parliament: Oxford West and Abingdon
- Website: Oxford City Council

Osney or Osney Island (/ˈoʊzni/; an earlier spelling of the name is Oseney) is a riverside community in the west of the city of Oxford, England. In modern times the name is applied to a community also known as Osney Town astride Botley Road, just west of the city's main railway station, on an island surrounded by the River Thames, Osney Ditch, and Osney Stream.

Until the early 20th century the name was applied to the larger island of Oxford Castle and New Osney (between Castle Mill Stream and the main stream of the Thames) on which Osney Abbey and Osney Mill were established during the Middle Ages. The place plays a minor but significant role in The Miller's Tale in Chaucer's The Canterbury Tales.

== History ==
The name "Osney" is Old English, and means either "Osa's Island" or "island in the Ouse": Ouzen Ait is a base form and Ouse is an Old English word for a (large) river. Until the early twentieth century the name was applied to the island formed by two streams of the River Thames immediately west of the centre of Oxford, Castle Mill Stream and the stream which is now the main channel of the river. To the north the island is bounded by a short channel between the River Thames and the Castle Mill Stream, the Sheepwash Channel, which separates it from Fiddler's Island and Cripley.

Osney Abbey was founded on the south part of the island in 1129, and Rewley Abbey was founded in the north of the island in 1280. Osney Mill was established by Osney Abbey on the west side of the island. The lands of both abbeys passed to Christ Church following the Dissolution of the Monasteries in 1538. The island formed part of St. Thomas's parish.

In 1790 the mill stream feeding Osney Mill on the west side of the island became the main navigation channel of the river, when Osney Lock was opened.

Until the beginning of the 19th century, only the side of the island east of St Thomas's Church was developed. In the nineteenth century the island changed significantly. The Great Western Railway built its line across the island from north to south in 1850, with new bridges across the Thames at the south end of the island, and across the Sheepwash Channel to the north. A new railway station was opened on the island two years later. In 1851 the Buckinghamshire Railway opened its line from the north across Sheepwash Channel to its Rewley Road station next to the GWR station. To house railway workers Osney Town was laid out in 1851 by George P. Hester, on an island west of Osney leased by Hester from Christ Church.

In the 1860s New Osney was developed around Mill Street, south of Botley Road between the railway and the river. The Cripley estate, north of Botley Road, was laid out in 1878. Osney Cemetery was opened in 1848 in the south of the island.

== Modern Osney ==
The name Osney is today usually applied to Osney Town. Most of Osney's two hundred-odd households live in 19th-century terraced cottages built on Hester's original grid. A minority of buildings are less than 50 years old, all on Bridge and West Streets, as well as a few significantly larger houses scattered throughout.

The island presently has two public houses, The Punter and The Holly Bush. A Working Men's Club and Institute Union affiliate, the West Oxford Democrats Club has premises. Osney is part of the Oxfordshire County Council ward of Jericho and Osney (as currently named, wards being periodically redefined to avoid malapportionment).

The district is also served by one church, St Frideswide's Church.

== New Osney ==
The name Osney is no longer applied to the island which historically bore the name. The part of the island east of the railway is now usually called St Thomas. The name survives on the island in New Osney, Osney Lane, Osney Cemetery, Osney Mill and Osney Marina. Osney Bridge carries the Botley Road (A420) west from the historic Osney island. Osney Lock was constructed in the river in 1790, between the island then known as Osney and the island now known as Osney.

== Osney Mead ==
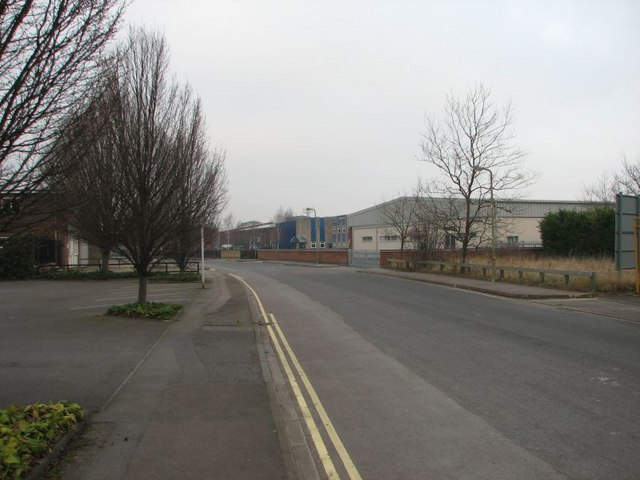
View along the main Osney Mead road.

From 1961 an industrial estate, named Osney Mead in 1966, was developed on meadowland between Osney and Bulstake Stream, to the east of Ferry Hinksey Road. The estate was initially intended to relocate badly sited existing local businesses. Organisations based there include publishers Alden Mowbray, Holywell Press, and Oxford Community Church, the last occupying a building on the estate formerly used by Oxford Instruments. Bodleian Libraries and the Department of Engineering Science, University of Oxford occupy buildings at the southeastern end of Osney Mead.

Holywell House is home to the ZERO Institute (Zero-carbon Energy Research Oxford), a University of Oxford research hub focused on net-zero energy systems, and serves as the registered office of Low Carbon Hub, a community energy organisation.

Newspaper House was designed by Arup Associates with mostly open plan Bürolandschaft offices and built 1970–72. It is the Oxfordshire headquarters of Newsquest which publishes local tabloid newspapers, including the weekly The Oxford Times and the daily Oxford Mail.

== See also ==
- Osney Abbey
- Osney Bridge (1885)
- Osney Cemetery (1848)
- Osney Rail Bridge
- Osney Lock
- Osney Marina
- Osney Mill

== Sources ==
- Crossley, Alan; Elrington, C.R. (eds.); Chance, Eleanor; Colvin, Christina; Cooper, Janet; Day, C.J.; Hassall, T.G.; Selwyn, Nesta (1979). A History of the County of Oxford, Volume 4. Victoria County History. (VCH)
- Prior, Mary (1982) [2011]. Fisher Row: fishermen, bargemen and canal boatmen in Oxford, 1500-1900. Chichester: Phillimore. ISBN 978-1860776526.
- Sherwood, Jennifer; Pevsner, Nikolaus (1974). Oxfordshire. The Buildings of England. Harmondsworth: Penguin Books. pp. 334–335. ISBN 0-14-071045-0.

Next island upstream	River Thames	Next island downstream
Fiddler's Island	Osney; Grid reference SP502060	Rose Isle
