= A420 road =

Road in England

A420

Major junctions
- West end: Old Market Street, Bristol
- A4044 A4320 A431 A4017 A4174 A4175; A46 A350; A4 A3102 A419 A417 A415 A338; A34 A4144 A4158 A4142; A40
- East end: Headington in Oxford

Location
- Country: United Kingdom
- Primary destinations: Chippenham; Swindon

Road network
- Roads in the United Kingdom; Motorways; A and B road zones

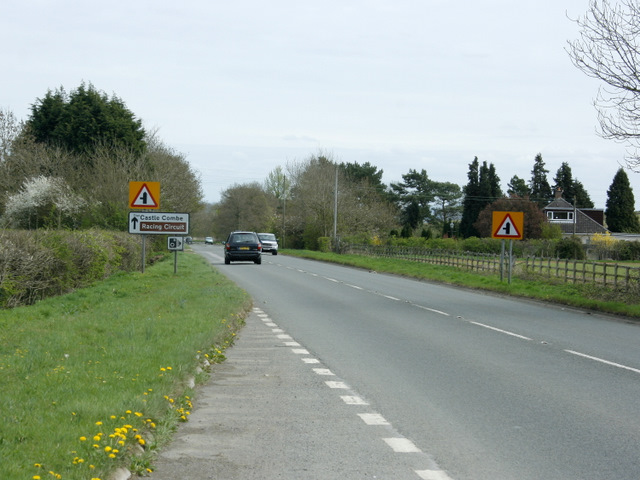
A420 heading to Chippenham

The A420 is a road between Bristol and Oxford in England. Between Swindon and Oxford it is a primary route.

== Route ==
Since the opening of the M4 motorway in the 1970s, the road has been in two sections. The first section begins on Old Market Street near the centre of Bristol and passes through Kingswood before leaving the city on the east side. From here it travels eastward over the southern part of the Cotswolds, to the north of Bath, to Chippenham in Wiltshire.

The second section begins at a junction with the A419 east of Swindon. It then travels under the Great Western Main Line at the twin-arch Acorn Bridge (the second arch was originally used by the Wilts & Berks Canal) and past Shrivenham and Watchfield (both bypassed in the 1980s), then on towards Faringdon in the Vale of White Horse. A further by-pass section, opened in 1979, avoids the centre of Faringdon, passing just south of Folly Hill and crossing the A417.

The A420 then travels the corallian limestone ridge that forms the north-west boundary of the Vale of White Horse, passing Littleworth, Buckland and Longworth. A dual-carriageway section by-passes Southmoor and Kingston Bagpuize on its way to Oxford. Most of the road between Swindon and Oxford, apart from the dual carriageway sections and a short section around Faringdon, is limited to 50 mph (80 km/h).

A further dual-carriageway section bypasses Cumnor Hill, to give a view of the "City of Dreaming Spires" that is Oxford from the west. After crossing the Oxford Ring Road, it passes through the suburb of Botley and down the Botley Road. It crosses the River Thames on Osney Bridge and reaches central Oxford after passing under the Cherwell Valley Line next to Oxford station. Within Oxford, it is routed along Oxpens Road, then Thames Street, parts of St Aldate's, then the High Street, which is closed to most motor traffic during the day. The road then crosses Magdalen Bridge to St Clements and East Oxford and ascends the notoriously steep Headington Hill to the suburb of Headington before terminating at the Headington Roundabout (known locally as the Green Road roundabout), where it meets the A40 and the Oxford Ring Road (designated the A4142).

Large vehicles such as lorries are advised by large signs at Oxford and Swindon not to take this route and use the alternative A34 and M4 route to Swindon. This is not enforced and the road is often heavily congested due to slow HGVs taking the shorter A420 route. The road has a poor accident record and this coupled with heavy peak time traffic caused it to be nicknamed the 'A420 Road to Hell' in local media in 2007. A survey in February 2018 claimed that it is the most dangerous A road in South East England.

== History ==
What is now the A420 was established in the early 18th century as a direct route between Chippenham and Bristol via Tog Hill, avoiding the older and more established route via Bath (now the A4). It was an important road for Bristol, whose communications with Bath had been disputed and difficult. After the Bath Road was turnpiked in 1707, the Bristol Trust attempted to turnpike the direct road in 1727, but faced opposition from colliers at Kingswood, and the road was not sufficiently improved until the 1740s.

When first classified in 1922, the A420 ran between Chippenham and Botley, near Oxford, while the road between Bristol and Chippenham was the A430. The two roads were later joined and the A430 renumbered A420. The road from Botley through Oxford to Headington was originally part of the A40. When the northern Oxford bypass was built in the 1930s, the A40 was rerouted along the bypass and the road through Oxford was renumbered A420.

As a result of the building of the M4 motorway in the early 1970s and subsequent road modernisation, the A420 between Chippenham and Swindon lost its identity. From Chippenham to Lyneham through Sutton Benger and to the north of RAF Lyneham and its limestone ridge, it became the B4069. From Lyneham to Swindon it became part of the A3102. From Swindon through Stratton St Margaret to the A419 it became the A4312.

Matches between rival football clubs Oxford United and Swindon Town are sometimes referred to as the "A420 derby".

== Site of fastest speeding ticket ==
The A420 near Kingston Bagpuize in Oxfordshire was the site of the fastest speeding offence ever caught in a routine speed check in the UK. On 27 January 2007, Timothy Brady, a 33-year-old man from Harrow, London, was clocked driving at 172 miles per hour (277 km/h) in a Porsche 911 Turbo that he had taken without permission from his employer, a luxury car hire firm. Brady was disqualified from driving and sentenced to 10 weeks in prison.
