= Hinksey Stream =

Stream in Oxfordshire, England

Coordinates: 51.7216°N 1.2429°W

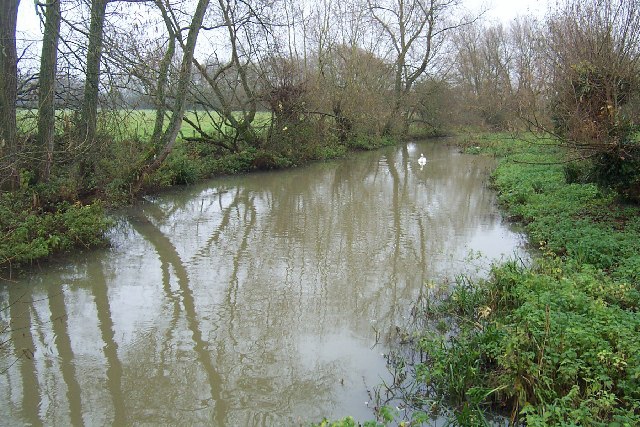
The stream at North Hinksey.

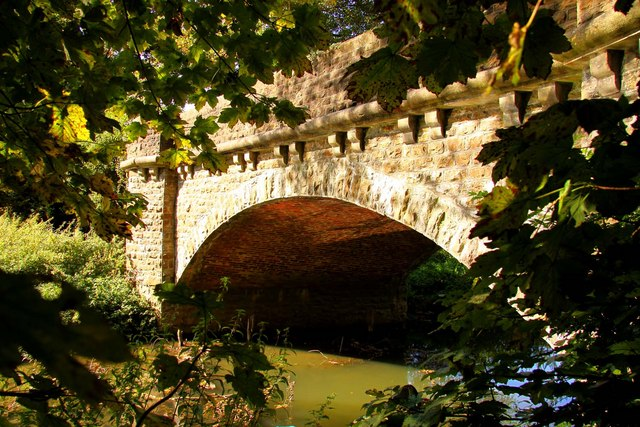
Bridge over Hinksey Stream.

Hinksey Stream is a branch of the River Thames to the west of the city of Oxford, England. It starts as Seacourt Stream (also known as Wytham Stream), which leaves the Thames at a bifurcation north of the village of Wytham, and rejoins the river south of the city near Kennington.

== Course ==
=== Seacourt Stream ===
From the bifurcation Seacourt Stream flows south past Wytham and under the A34 Oxford Ring Road. Near the site of the lost village of Seacourt Botley Stream branches off Seacourt Stream on its left bank, and flows 0.8 km to enter Bulstake Stream. Seacourt Stream then flows under Botley Road and enters Bulstake Stream near North Hinksey.

Seacourt Stream is 12.7 km long.

=== Hinksey Stream ===
Hinksey Stream branches off Seacourt Stream on its right bank just before the confluence with Bulstake Stream. It flows between the village of South Hinksey to the west and the suburb of New Hinksey to the east. It flows under the Oxford Ring Road near its junction with the Abingdon Road (A4144). Shortly afterwards it is joined on its left bank by Weirs Mill Stream, another branch of the Thames, 2.1 km long, which leaves the river just north of Donnington Bridge. Hinksey Stream joins the Thames just above Kennington Railway Bridge. The Thames Path crosses Hinksey Stream on a footbridge at this point.

A ferry used to operate between Ferry Hinksey Road, off the Botley Road in west Oxford, and North Hinksey, former known as Ferry Hinksey. This ceased operation in 1928 and the two are now linked by bridges.

Hinksey Stream is 4.2 km long.

== Boundary ==
In Anglo-Saxon times Seacourt Stream formed part of the border between Mercia and Wessex, and until 1974 it was part of the boundary between Berkshire and Oxfordshire. In the 16th century the stream was known as Shire Lake.

Downstream of North Hinksey the boundary between Berkshire and Oxfordshire was Hogacre Stream (or Hogacre Ditch), a branch of Bulstake Stream which runs parallel to Hinksey Stream and joins it after 1.9 km. Between 1889 (when Grandpont and New Hinksey were absorbed into Oxfordshire) and 1974, Hinksey Stream was the boundary south of its confluence with Hogacre Stream.

== See also ==
- List of rivers of England

Next confluence upstream	River Thames	Next confluence downstream
River Cherwell (north)	Hinksey Stream	River Ock (south)
