= List of road junctions in the United Kingdom: H =

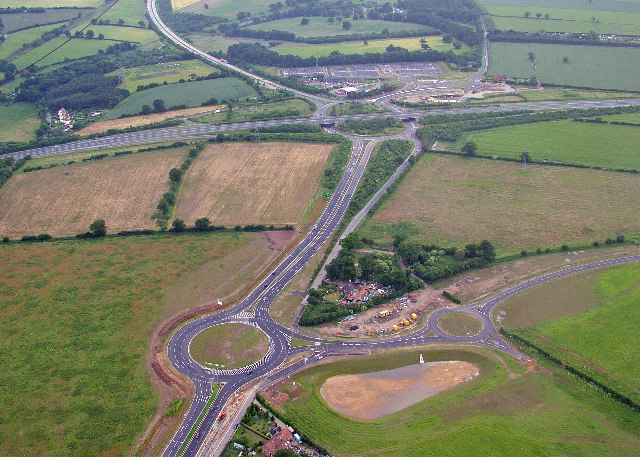
Thickthorn Interchange

This is part of the list of road junctions in the United Kingdom.

Many road junctions are named after pubs. For more information regarding the derivation of pub names see pub names.

== H ==
Junction Name	Type	Location	Roads	Grid Reference	Notes
Hackney Wick	Diamond Interchange	Hackney Wick, LB Hackney	A12 East Cross Route; A102 Kenworthy Road; A106 Park Road; A115 Chapman Road; B113 Wick Road	51°32′43″N 0°01′56″W	
Hackney's Corner		Great Blakenham, Suffolk	B1113 Stowmarket Road (formerly A45); B1113 Bramford Road; Gipping Road (formerly A45)	TM120505	
Haigh Roundabout		Haigh, West Yorkshire	M1 J38; A637 Huddersfield Road; Haigh Lane	SE298119	
Hal's Grave		near Wadebridge, Cornwall	A39; A389	SW957715	
Halbeath		Halbeath, Fife	M90 J3; A92; A907	51°36′46″N 0°02′16″W	
Halfway		Halfway, South Yorkshire	B6053; B6058	53°19′39″N 1°20′42″W	
Halfway House		East Horndon, Essex	A127 Southend Arterial Road; A128 Tilbury Road	51°34′48″N 0°21′29″E	
Hall Lane		Chingford, LB Waltham Forest	A406 North Circular Road (E/B only); A1009 Hall Lane	51°36′46″N 0°02′16″W	Access to the North Circular Road Westbound is now via the old Lea Valley Viaduct to the Cooks Wharf Roundabout
Halloon		St Columb Road, Cornwall	A39; A392; Parka Road	SW912598	
Hamilton Interchange		Hamilton, South Lanarkshire	M74 J6; A723	55°46′48″N 4°01′16″W	
Ham Barn Roundabout		Liss, Hampshire	A3; B3006	SU772294	The roundabout was constructed where the A3 Petersfield Bypass intersects the B3006 near Ham Barn Farm
Ham Cross		Richmond Park, LB Richmond upon Thames	Unclassified road in Richmond Park; B352 Ham Gate Avenue	51°25′58.76″N 0°17′13.24″W	Located within Richmond Park near Ham Gate.
Hamlin's Corner		Burgess Hill, West Sussex	Job's Lane; Bishopstone Road	TQ283206	
Hammersmith Flyover	Roundabout Interchange	Hammersmith, LB Hammersmith and Fulham	A4 Great West Road; A4 Talgarth Road; A306 Hammersmith Bridge Road; A219 Fulham Palace Road; A219 Shepherds Bush Road; A315 Hammersmith Road; A315 King Street	51°29′29″N 0°13′24″W	
Hammond's Corner		Stowupland, Suffolk	Creeting Lane; unclass.	TM081594	
Hammonds Corner		New Romney, Kent	A259; B2075	50°59′05″N 0°55′19″E	
Hampton Court Roundabout		Hampton, LB Richmond upon Thames	A308 Hampton Court Road; A309 Hampton Court Bridge	51°24′18″N 0°20′30″W	
Hampton Wick Roundabout		Hampton Wick, LB Richmond upon Thames	A308 Hampton Court Road; A308 Kingston Bridge; A310 Hampton Wick High Street	51°24′41″N 0°18′40″W	
Handcross Junction		Handcross, West Sussex	A23; B2110; B2114	TQ261297	
Handy Cross Roundabout	Roundabout Interchange	Handy Cross, Buckinghamshire	M40 J4; A404; A4010	51°36′44″N 0°46′07″W	
Hanford Roundabout		Hanford, Stoke-on-Trent	A500 Stoke D-Road; A34	SJ867428	
Hanger Lane Gyratory		LB Ealing	A40 Western Avenue; A406 North Circular Road; A406 Hanger Lane; A4005 Hanger Lane; Twyford Abbey Road	51°31′49″N 0°17′36″W	
Hangman's Stone	Staggered	Branscombe, East Devon	A3052; B3174 Hollyhead Road; unclass., to Southleigh and Blackbury Camp	50.7121°N 3.1280°W	Named on road signs approaching junction
Hardendale: aka Shap		Shap, Cumbria	M6 J39; B6261 (for A6)	54°30′30″N 2°38′59″W	
Hardwick Roundabout	Roundabout Interchange	King's Lynn, Norfolk	A10; A47; A149	52°44′10″N 0°25′03″E	
Harker Junction		Harker, Cumbria	A74; unclass.	54°56′26″N 2°58′01″W	Access to the A74 has been closed prior to the upgrade of this section to motorway.
Harlington Corner		Harlington, LB Hillingdon	A4 Bath Road; A437 High Street	51°28′51″N 0°26′04″W	
Harraton Cross		Modbury, Devon	A379; B3392; unclass.	50.3402°N 3.8674°W	
Harrow Road Intersection		Stonebridge, LB Brent	A406 North Circular Road; A404 Harrow Road	51°32′41″N 0°16′20″W	
Hartshay Hill Roundabout		Ripley, Derbyshire	A38; A610; B6441 Hartshay Hill	SK391513	
Hartspring Roundabout		Watford, Hertfordshire	A41 Otterspool Way; B462 Hartspring Lane; B462 Denham Road	51°39′57″N 0°21′44″W	
Hastingwood Interchange	Roundabout Interchange	Harlow, Essex	M11 J7; A414 (formerly A11); A414 (formerly A122); B1393 (formerly A11)	51°44′39″N 0°07′59″E	
Hastoe Cross		Hastoe, Hertfordshire	Marlin Hill; Church Lane	51°46′32″N 0°39′42″W	
Hatton Cross		Hatton, LB Hounslow	A30 Great South West Road; Fagg's Road	51°28′01″N 0°25′20″W	
Haudagain Roundabout		Aberdeen, Aberdeen City council area	A96 Auchmill Road; A96 Great Northern Road; A90 Mugiemoss Road; A90 North Anderson Drive	NJ913091	A very busy junction on a small, outdated roundabout. Council debating upgrade options.
Haversham Roundabout		Old Wolverton, Milton Keynes	V6 Grafton Street; Haversham Road; Wolverton Road	52°04′06″N 0°48′20″W	
Haydock Island		Haydock, Merseyside	M6 J23; A49; A580	53°28′16″N 2°38′02″W	
Headington Roundabout: aka Green Road Roundabout		Oxford, Oxfordshire	A40 North Way; A420 London Road; A40 London Road; A4142 Eastern By-pass; Bayswater Road	51°45′47″N 1°11′49″W	
Heath Cross		near Whitestone, Devon	unclass road from Tedburn St Mary to Whitestone; Heath Lane; Blackdown Lane	SX849943	
Heathway, Dagenham		Dagenham, LB Barking and Dagenham	A1306 Ripple Road (formerly A13); A1306 New Road (formerly A13); A1240 Heathway; Chequers Lane	51°31′55″N 0°08′53″E	
Hele Cross		Hele, Devon	B3181 (formerly A38); unclass.	SS999021	
Helen Street Interchange		Glasgow	M8 J24; Helen Street	55°51′00″N 4°19′09″W	
Helicopter Roundabout	Roundabout	Weston-super-Mare, North Somerset	A371 Locking Moor Road; The Runway; Beaufighter Road	51°20′30.29″N 2°55′55.26″W	
Hellfire Crossroads	Crossroads	Wyke, West Yorkshire	A641 Huddersfield Road; A58 Whitehall Road East	53°43′50″N 1°46′36″W	The origin of the name is uncertain; it may be due to the observance of unexplained "earthlights" at this location.
Henlys Corner		London	A1 Falloden Way; A1 Great North Way; A406 North Circular Road; A598 Regents Park Road; A598 Finchley Road	51°35′22″N 0°12′07″W	named after a car dealership, which confusingly, has moved further east along the A406 near to the junction with Bounds Green Road.
Henly's Roundabout		Hounslow, LB Hounslow	A4 Bath Road; A30 Great South West Road	51°28′32″N 0°23′46″W	
Hermiston Gait		Hermiston, City of Edinburgh council area	A720; M8 J1	NT181710	
Hewitt's Roundabout	Roundabout	Knockholt, Kent	A21 Sevenoaks Road; M25 spur to J4; A224 Orpington Bypass; Hewitts Road; Wheatsheaf Hill	51°20′50″N 0°08′12″E	Hewitt's Farm is just off the Roundabout
Heyford Hill		Oxford, Oxfordshire	A4142; A4074; A423	SP530029	
Hicks Gate Roundabout		Bristol	A4 Bath Road; A4 Keynsham Bypass; A4174; A4175 Durley Hill	51°25′31″N 2°30′59″W	
Hickstead Junction		Hickstead, West Sussex	A23; A2300 Jobs Lane; Hickstead Lane	TQ269203	
High Cross	Crossroads	near Churchtown, Cornwall	unclass.	SX045630	
Higher Cross	Crossroads	Culmstock, Devon	unclass.	ST085148	
Highgate	Crossroads	Balsall Heath, Birmingham	A4540 Belgrave Middleway; Longmore Street; Horton Square	SP073852	
Highgate Hill	Roundabout Interchange	Indian Queens, Cornwall	A30; A39; B3279; unclass.	SW924591	aka Indian Queens
Hillingdon Interchange		Glasgow	M8 J26; A736	55°52′03″N 4°22′01″W	
Hill View Roundabout	Roundabout	Weston-super-Mare, North Somerset	B3440 Locking Road; Baytree Road; Hill View Court	51°21′09.11″N 2°56′25.67″W	
Hinksey Hill Interchange		Hinksey Hill, Oxfordshire	A34; A423 Oxford Ring Road	51°43′41″N 1°15′32″W	
Hockerill	Crossroads	Bishop's Stortford, Hertfordshire	A1250 (formerly A120); A1060 (formerly A11); B1383 (formerly A11)	51°52′10″N 0°09′59″E	
Hockley Circus	Roundabout with flyover	Birmingham, West Midlands	A41 Soho Hill; B4100 Hockley Hill (formerly A41); A4540 (A41) Heaton Street; B4515 Hunters Road; A4540 (A41) New John Street West	SP058886	
Hoddesdon Interchange	Roundabout Interchange	Hoddesdon, Hertfordshire	A10; Dinant Link Road	51°45′54″N 0°01′49″W	
Hodge Lea Roundabout		Hodge Lea, Milton Keynes	H2 Millers Way; V5 Great Monks Street	52°03′09″N 0°48′44″W	
Hogarth Roundabout		Chiswick, LB Hounslow	A4 Great West Road; A316 Burlington Lane; A316 Hogarth Flyover; A316 Dorchester Grove	51°29′13″N 0°15′09″W	Named after William Hogarth, 18th Century satirical artist
Hog's Back		Guildford, Surrey	A3; A31 Hog's Back	SU966486	
Holborn Circus		Holborn, LB Camden	A4 Fetter Lane; A40 High Holborn; A40 Holborn Viaduct; A4208 St Andrew Street; B500 Charterhouse Street; B521 Hatton Gardens	51°31′04″N 0°06′28″W	
Hole Cross		Bere Alston, Devon	unclass.; unclass.	SX454654	
Hollacombe Cross	T junction	Colebrooke, Devon	unclass. roads to: Raddon Down Cross N; Hollacombe E; Brandise Corner S	50.7889°N 3.7175°W	Named on fingerpost
Holland Park		Shepherd's Bush, LB Hammersmith and Fulham	A3220 West Cross Route (formerly M41); A3220 Holland Road; A402 Uxbridge Road; A402 Holland Park Avenue	51°30′16″N 0°13′01″W	
Hollygrove Roundabout		Goldthorpe, South Yorkshire	A635 Barnsley Road; A635 Goldthorpe Bypass; Barnsley Road; Commercial Road	53°31′59″N 1°19′29″W	
Holmfield Interchange		Ferrybridge, West Yorkshire	A1(M); M62 J32a	SE465241	Named after the Country house, farm, and cottages which the interchange is located next to.
Holmston Roundabout		Ayr, South Ayrshire	A77; A70; A70 Holmston Road	NS360211	
Holystone Interchange	Roundabout	near Shiremoor, Tyne and Wear	A19 road; A186 road; A191 road	55°1′43″N 1°31′23″W	
Holywell Cross		Holywell, Dorset	A37 Long Ash Lane; Haydon Lane; East Hill	50°50′12″N 2°34′38″W	
Honda North		Swindon, Wiltshire	A361 Highworth Road; B4141 Kingsdown Road	SU180890	Located at the northern end of Swindon's Honda plant.
Honda South		Swindon, Wiltshire	A419; A361 Highworth Road; B4006 Highworth Road	SU176880	Located at the southern end of Swindon's Honda plant.
Hoo Ash roundabout		south of Swannington, Leicestershire	5-ways roundabout: unclassified (formerly A447) north; A447 south; A511 east-west; unclassified (formerly A50) south east	SK410150	western end of Coalville bypass
Hooley Junction		Hooley, Surrey	M23 J7; A23	TQ288551	
Hook Junction		Hook, Royal Borough of Kingston	A3 Hook Rise; A309 Kingston Bypass Road; A243 Hook Road	51°22′30″N 0°18′14″W	
Hook Moor	Grade Separated Fork Interchange	Micklefield, West Yorkshire	M1 J48; A1(M) J44	51°22′30″N 0°18′14″W	
Hopgrove Roundabout		York, North Yorkshire	A64; A1036; A1237	53°59′24″N 1°01′23″W	
Hopwood Park		Hopwood, Worcestershire	M42 J2; A441	SP036737	
Horns Cross		Stone Kent	A226; Stone Place Road; Hedge Place Road	TQ575744	
Hornshill		Stepps, North Lanarkshire	M80 J3; B757	55°54′06″N 4°08′21″W	
Horse & Jockey	T junction	Bournemouth, Dorset	A447 Wimborne Road; A3060 Castle Lane West; Redhill Drive; Park Lane	50.7618°N 1.8749°W	
Horsley Cross		Essex	A120 Harwich Road (formerly A604); B1035 Clacton Road	TM124273	
Horseley Fields Junction		Wolverhampton	A454 Horseley Fields; A454 Middle Cross		Heading west at junction gives access to railway station for general traffic (original route via Railway Drive now restricted access).
Hospital Bridge Roundabout		LB Richmond upon Thames	A316 Chertsey Road; B358 Hospital Bridge Road	51°26′34″N 0°21′54″W	
Hospital Roundabout		Eaglestone, Milton Keynes	H8 (A421/B4024) Standing Way; Farthing Grove	52°01′27″N 0°44′10″W	
Hospital Roundabout		Yeovil, Somerset	A30 Queensway; A30 Reckleford; A37 Kingston	50°56′37″N 2°38′06″W	
Horse Cross	Crossroads	East Hertfordshire	A120 Stane Street; unclass.	51°53′26″N 0°03′18″E	
Houndalee		Widdrington, Northumberland	A1068; B1337 Grangemoor Road	55°14′59″N 1°36′13″W	
Hoylandswaine Roundabout		Penistone, South Yorkshire	A628 Barnsley Road; A629 High Lee Lane; A629 Halifax Road	53°32′04″N 1°36′45″W	
Hudnall Corner		Hundall, Bedfordshire	A4146 Hemel Hempstead Road; Pedley Hill	51°48′34″N 0°31′50″W	
Humbie Roundabout (former site of)	Roundabout	Kirkliston, City of Edinburgh council area	M9 spur to J1a; A8000; B800 Queensferry Road	NT125755	formerly a roundabout at this site, now the M9 spur crosses over the B800 at this location with no junction
Hunt Lane Roundabout	Roundabout	Duxford, Cambridgeshire	A505; Hunt Lane	52°06′04″N 0°08′37″E	
Hunton Bridge Interchange	Roundabout	Watford, Hertfordshire	M25; A41 North Western Avenue; A41 Watford Road; A411 Hempstead Road	51°41′02″N 0°25′53″W	
Hutton Moor Roundabout	Roundabout	Weston-Super-Mare, North Somerset	A370 Herluin Road; A370 Flowerdown Bridge; Clover Ct; Aisecome Way	ST344612	
Hyde Park Corner	Roundabout	London	A4 Knightsbridge; A4 Piccadilly; A4202 Park Lane; A302 Grosvenor Place; B310 Grosvenor Crescent; Constitution Hill	51°30′11″N 0°09′08″W	
