= Hinksey =

English place name

Coordinates: 51°44′N 1°16′W

Hinksey is the name of a number of places on the fringe of Oxford, including the villages of North and South Hinksey, the suburb of New Hinksey, and Hinksey Stream, a branch of the River Thames. Prior to the county boundary changes of 1974, which transferred a large section of Berkshire to Oxfordshire, many of the places associated with the name were in the former.

== History ==
The place name is of Old English origin. It is first mentioned in the 9th century in the form Hengestesieg, and probably means "stallion island". It may also mean "island of a man named Hengest", but there is no evidence to link the place to the historical Hengest. Place names ending in -ey ("island", commonly used of higher ground in a marshy area) are of early formation, probably names bestowed by the first English farmers who tackled the area. The Hinksey villages were not mentioned as separate villages until 1316.

Hinxey Hall was located in Oxford during the 14th to 16th centuries.

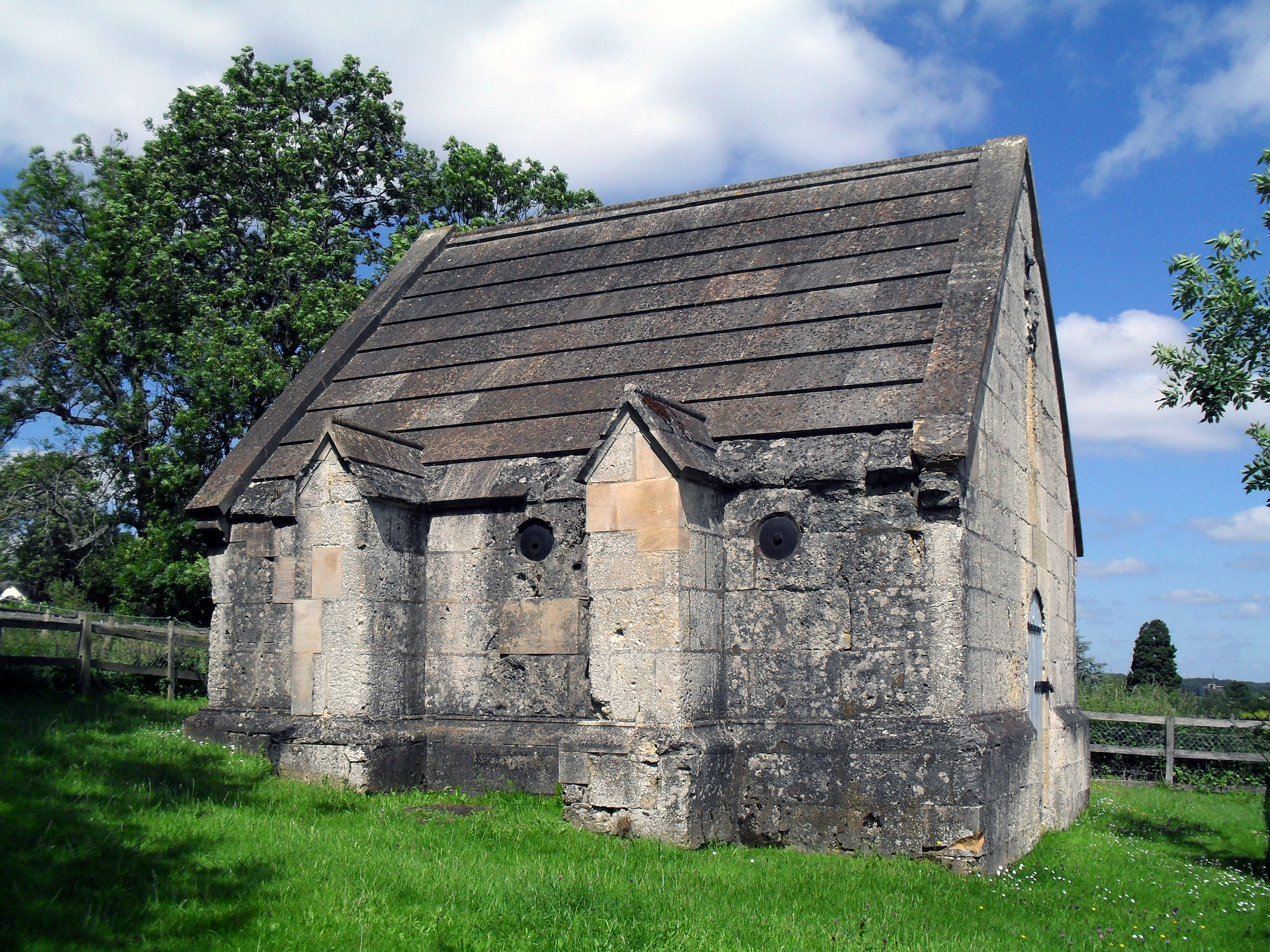
Conduit House, a roofed reservoir at Hinksey for Oxford's first water mains, built during the early 17th century

The Carfax Conduit from Harcourt Hill (North Hinksey) to Carfax in the centre of Oxford was completed in 1617.

Hinksey Halt railway station served New Hinksey in south Oxford during 1908−15. In 1934, Hinksey Park was laid out in New Hinksey.

== Geography ==
There are now two villages, North Hinksey to the west of the city of Oxford and South Hinksey to the southwest. Hinksey Stream runs past the west of Oxford, a branch of the River Thames. Hinksey Hill Farm lies on Hinksey Hill, close to South Hinksey. Ferry Hinksey Road is a road in west Oxford. There is also a suburb called New Hinksey to the south of the town centre, which contains the Oxford City Council ward Hinksey Park. Here, Hinksey Park itself is an 11-acre park, including an open-air swimming pool, off Abingdon Road.

== Culture ==
The watercolour painter William Turner (1789–1862) painted many views of Oxford from the Hinksey area, including Oxford from above Hinksey and Oxford from Hinksey Hill.

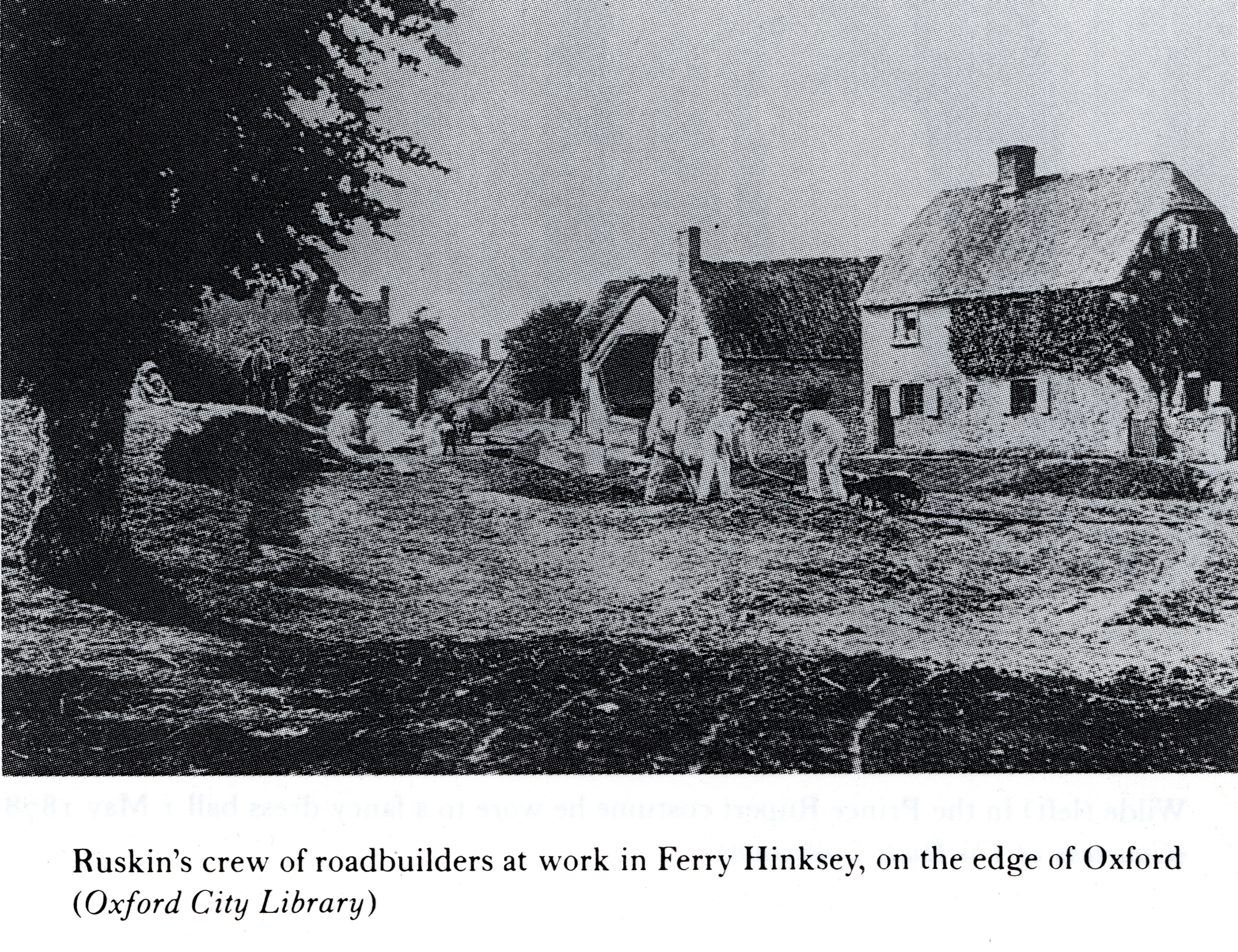
John Ruskin's road builders at Ferry Hinksey

The art critic John Ruskin (1819–1900) used to walk between Abingdon, where he stayed at the Crown and Thistle, and Oxford. He found the path muddy and organized a party of undergraduates to improve the roadway in the Hinksey area.

Laurence Binyon (1869–1943) wrote a poem entitled Ferry Hinksey.

Matthew Arnold (1822–1888) mentions Hinksey in his poems Thyrsis and The Scholar Gipsy.

== Sport ==
Hinksey Pool was the original home of Hinksey Sculling School, a community rowing club.
