= Carfax Conduit =

Water conduit in England

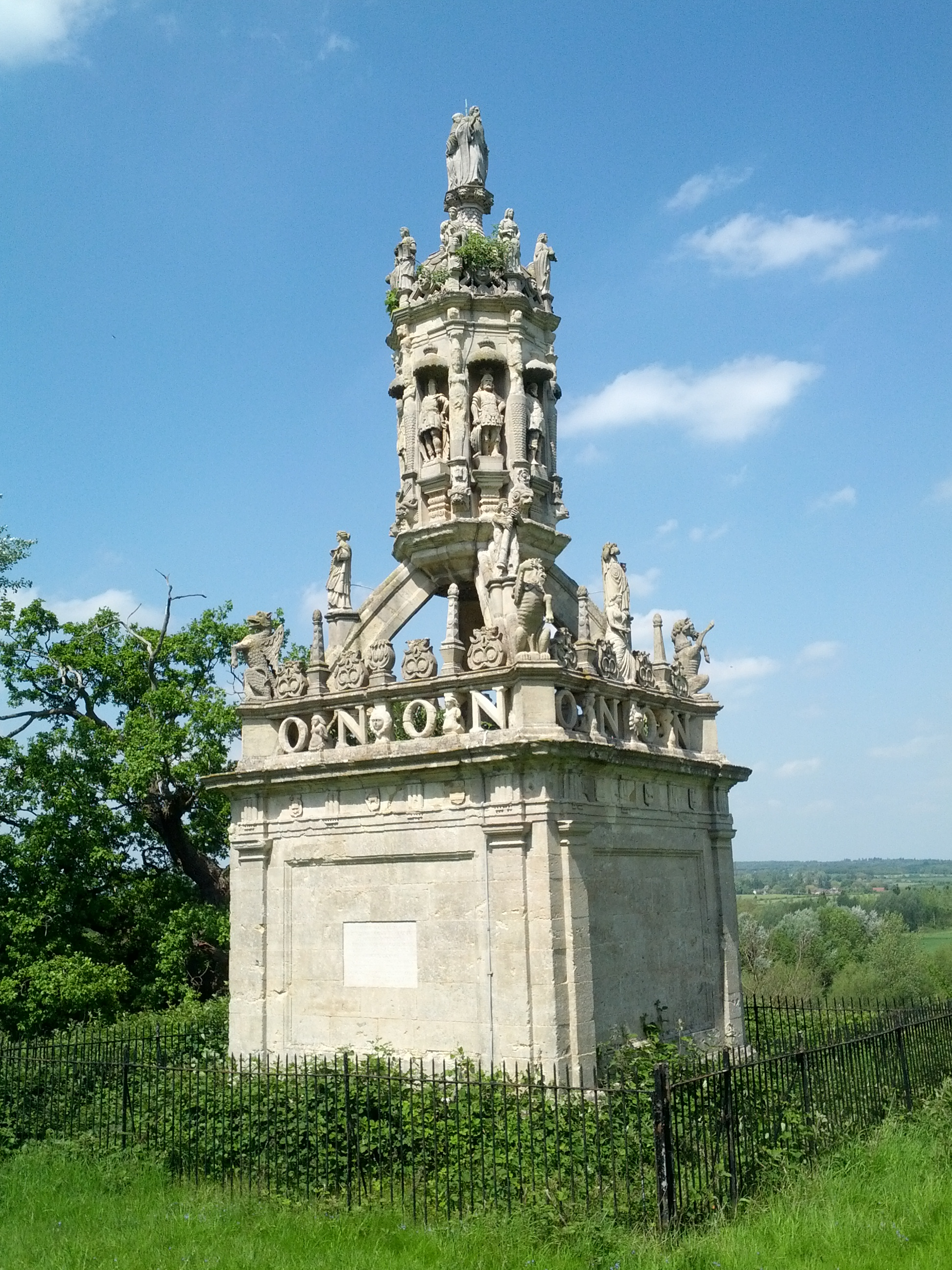
Carfax Conduit building in the grounds of Nuneham House, Oxfordshire

The Carfax Conduit was a water conduit that supplied the city of Oxford with water from 1610 until 1869.

The conduit ran in an underground lead pipe from a spring on Hinksey Hill above the village of North Hinksey, beneath Seacourt Stream and the River Thames, to a building at Carfax in the centre of Oxford. The system was built by Otho Nicholson, a London lawyer, to supply the citizens of Oxford with clean water. It replaced a system built by Osney Abbey between 1205 and 1221 that had fallen into disrepair.

The conduit building at Carfax was an elaborate structure, some 40 feet (12 m) tall, with eight niches containing statues of historic and mythical figures. By 1787, it had become an obstacle to traffic, and it was removed in 1797 and replaced by a smaller cistern. The original structure was given to the Earl Harcourt, who had it re-erected in the grounds of his home, Nuneham House, where it remains to this day. Two plaques are attached to opposite sides of the building, giving a short history in English and Latin. The re-erected conduit is a Grade I listed building and scheduled monument.

A building, now called the Conduit House, was built at Harcourt Hill over the spring. It remains in situ and is in the care of English Heritage. The Conduit House site is designated as a Grade II* listed building and a scheduled monument.

The entire system fell into disuse in the 19th century. In 1869, when it was carrying very little water, the conduit was sold to Oxford Corporation.

== Locations ==
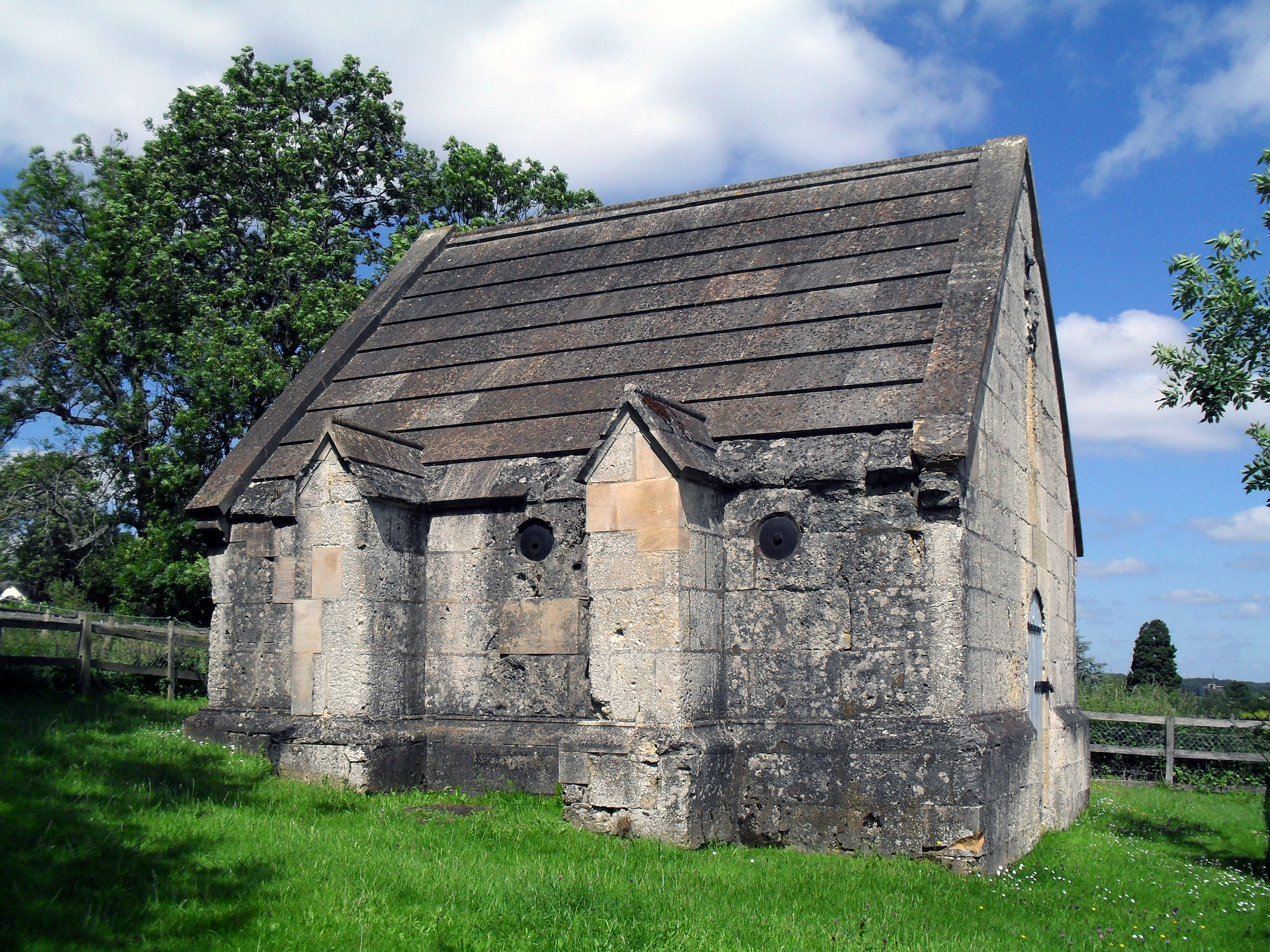
Conduit House

- Conduit House 51.74194°N 1.28413°W
- Carfax 51.7519°N 1.2579°W
- Cistern, now at Nuneham House 51.6752°N 1.2244°W
