= Raleigh Park, Oxfordshire =

Park in Oxfordshire, England

Coordinates: 51°44′37″N 1°17′18″W

Raleigh Park is a park of about 27 acres (110,000 m^{2}) in North Hinksey, Oxfordshire (formerly in Berkshire), just west of Oxford. The land was formerly part of the estates of the Harcourt family. The land was sold in 1924 to Raymond ffennell, then owner of Wytham Abbey, who gave it to the City of Oxford for use as a park. It was named in honour of Walter Raleigh, who lived nearby on Harcourt Hill and died in 1922.

Although the park lies in the green belt outside the city boundary, it is managed by Oxford City Council as a nature reserve and recreational park. It is on rising ground, giving expansive views over the city of Oxford.
