= North Hinksey =

Village in Oxfordshire, England

Coordinates: 51.749°N 1.292°W

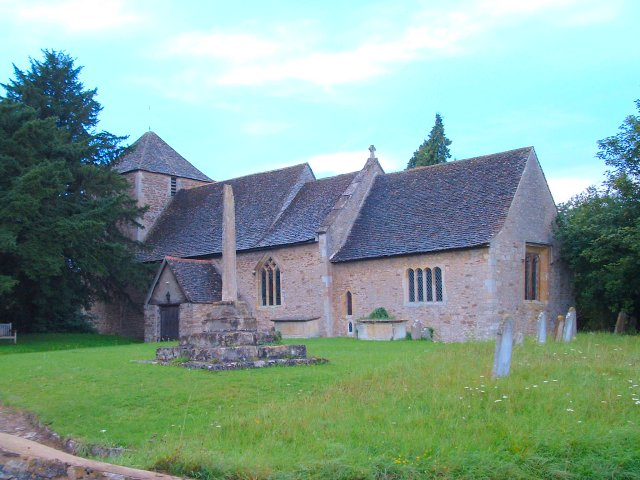

- Location within Oxfordshire
- Population: 4,316 (2001 census)
- OS grid reference: SP4905
- Civil parish: Botley and North Hinksey
- District: Vale of White Horse
- Shire county: Oxfordshire
- Region: South East
- Country: England
- Sovereign state: United Kingdom
- Post town: Oxford
- Postcode district: OX2
- Dialling code: 01865
- Police: Thames Valley
- Fire: Oxfordshire
- Ambulance: South Central
- UK Parliament: Oxford West and Abingdon
- Website: North Hinksey Parish Council

North Hinksey is a village in the civil parish of Botley and North Hinksey, in the Vale of White Horse district, in Oxfordshire, England, on the west side of the Thames flood plain immediately opposite the city of Oxford. The civil parish includes the large settlement of Botley, effectively an isolated suburb of Oxford, with the Botley Road as the sole highway link across the flood plain. North Hinksey was in all respects part of Berkshire until the 1974 boundary changes transferred administration of the Vale of White Horse district to Oxfordshire County Council; it remains part of the historic county of Berkshire however, since the 1974 act did not change the ancient county boundaries. The village of North Hinksey has a manor house, The Fishes public house, a Church of England primary school and a Church of England parish church, St. Lawrence's, which dates back to at least the 12th century. Four of the older houses have thatched roofs.

There was also the administrative offices of the Church of England Diocese of Oxford (Diocesan Church House) in the enlarged former vicarage. This, as of September 2016 is to be converted to housing. Harcourt Hill and Raleigh Park lie to the southwest of the village. All the shopping and other facilities in the parish are now found in Botley. The centre of the old village is now effectively cut off from much of the newer part of Botley by the busy Oxford Ring Road, part of the A34 trunk road, though there are two pedestrian underpasses. The parish has a cemetery which includes 671 identified Commonwealth war graves.

== History ==
Also called Hengestesige (10th century); Hengsteseia (12th century); Henxtesey (13th century); Northengseye (15th century); Laurence Hinksey, Ferry Hinksey, Ivy Hinksey, (passim). North Hinksey was anciently called Hengestseigge, and was given in 955 to Abingdon Abbey. This place was settled in the Saxon era. Its toponym is thought to mean 'stallion's isle'. Along with the neighbouring village of South Hinksey, it was once part of the estate of the Benedictine abbey at Abingdon, and was in Berkshire until the boundary changes of 1974. The village appears on the 1610 John Speed map as 'Laurence Hinksey', after the church's dedication, while a 1670s map shows 'Ivy Hinksey'.

It was also at one time called Ferry Hinksey, being linked to the eastern side of Hinksey Stream by a small ferry, reached from west Oxford by way of Ferry Hinksey Road. The ferry ceased operation in 1928, and the various streams are now crossed by small bridges, though a 'Ferry Cottage' remains that matches the period and has access to the river. Ferry Hinksey (as it was then) is also the burial place of Thomas and Rachael Willis (died 1648 and 1631 respectively) the parents of the physician Dr Thomas Willis. He played an important part in the history of anatomy, neurology, and psychiatry, and was a founding member of the Royal Society.

The parish church of Saint Lawrence's contains two war memorials commemorating the twenty-three men of North Hinksey and Botley who died in the two world wars.

On 1 April 2023 the civil parish was renamed from "North Hinksey" to "Botley and North Hinksey".

== John Ruskin and the diggers ==
The critic John Ruskin was fond of riding out from Oxford, and his trips often took him westwards to North Hinksey, whose rustic charm he admired. (There is a plaque to this effect on one of the old thatched cottages.) He noted the poor state of the village road, and in 1874, he thought of a scheme which would give Oxford students the benefits of manual labour, and also improve conditions for the villagers. He organised a group of undergraduates to help him in the building of an improved road, bordered with banks of flowers. The episode might have vanished into historical obscurity, except that the students in his road-building gang included Oscar Wilde, Alfred Milner, Hardwicke Rawnsley, William Gershom Collingwood and Arnold Toynbee. Wilde later wrote of the episode in Art and the Handicraftsman, (published in Essays, 1879):

We were coming down the street—a troop of young men, some of them like myself only nineteen, going to river or tennis-court or cricket-field—when Ruskin going up to lecture in cap and gown met us. He seemed troubled and prayed us to go back with him to his lecture, which a few of us did, and there he spoke to us not on art this time but on life, saying that it seemed to him to be wrong that all the best physique and strength of the young men in England should be spent aimlessly on cricket ground or river, without any result at all except that if one rowed well one got a pewter-pot, and if one made a good score, a cane-handled bat. He thought, he said, that we should be working at something that would do good to other people, at something by which we might show that in all labour there was something noble. Well, we were a good deal moved, and said we would do anything he wished. So he went out round Oxford and found two villages, Upper and Lower Hinksey, and between them there lay a great swamp, so that the villagers could not pass from one to the other without many miles of a round. And when we came back in winter he asked us to help him to make a road across this morass for these village people to use. So out we went, day after day, and learned how to lay levels and to break stones, and to wheel barrows along a plank—a very difficult thing to do. And Ruskin worked with us in the mist and rain and mud of an Oxford winter, and our friends and our enemies came out and mocked us from the bank. We did not mind it much then, and we did not mind it afterwards at all, but worked away for two months at our road. And what became of the road? Well, like a bad lecture it ended abruptly—in the middle of the swamp. Ruskin going away to Venice, when we came back for the next term there was no leader, and the 'diggers', as they called us, fell asunder.

== Local topography ==
It remains difficult to travel from North Hinksey to South Hinksey, although the Oxford Ring Road now links the two villages. The most notable path between Oxford and North Hinksey is a metalled bridleway and cycle track variously known as Willow Walk and Ruskin's Ride. This path was built in 1876–77 by Aubrey Harcourt (1852–1904), a major local landowner, but not open to the public until 1922. There is also a smaller unmade path which begins alongside the large back garden of The Fishes and crosses Hinksey Stream by a bridge at the site of the old ferry.

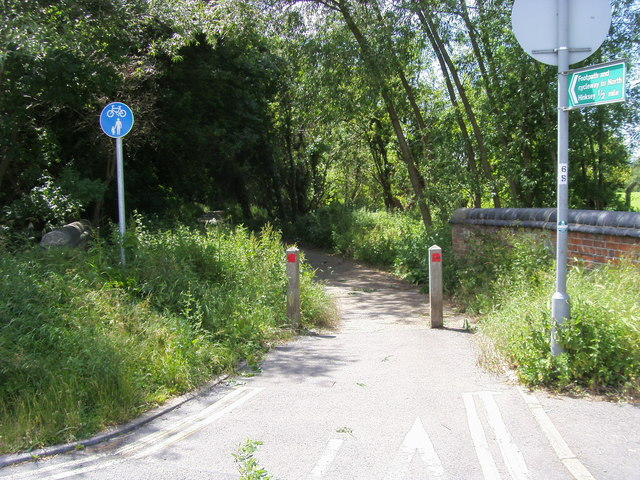
Footpath and cycleway between Oxford and North Hinksey via Ferry Hinksey Road.

=== Raleigh Park ===
Raleigh Park, comprising woodland, grassland and unusual alkaline boggy areas, lies in North Hinksey just west of the Oxford ring road. It is managed by Oxford City Council and conservation work is done by the Friends of Raleigh Park and the Oxford Conservation Volunteers.

== See also ==
- Hinksey
- Hinksey Stream
- New Hinksey
- South Hinksey
