= Oxford bypass =

Oxford bypass may refer to:

- Oxford Ring Road, a road orbiting Oxford, England and acting as a bypass for various routes
- Kennett–Oxford Bypass, a segment of U.S. Route 1 that bypasses Oxford, Pennsylvania
