= St Lawrence's Church, North Hinksey =

Coordinates: 51.7459°N 1.2846°W

St Lawrence's Church
- The Parish Church of St Lawrence, North Hinksey
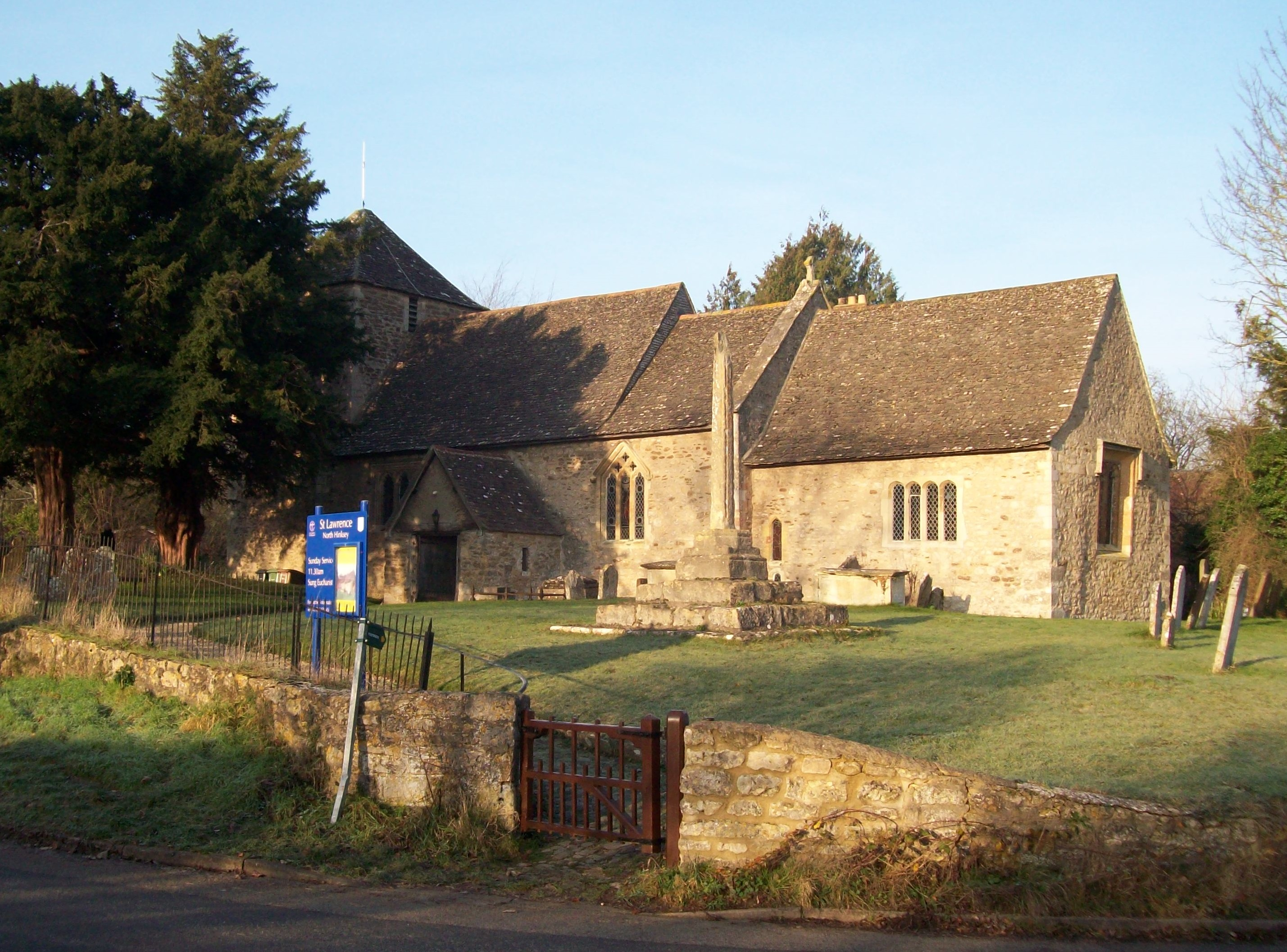
- St Lawrence's Church from North Hinksey Lane
- St Lawrence's Church
- OS grid reference: SP 49483 05479
- Location: North Hinksey Lane, North Hinksey, Oxon. OX2 0NB
- Country: England
- Denomination: Church of England
- Previous denomination: Roman Catholic Church
- Website: osneybenefice.org.uk

History
- Status: Active
- Dedication: St. Lawrence

Architecture
- Functional status: Parish church
- Heritage designation: Grade II* listed
- Designated: 09-Feb-1966
- Years built: c. 1100

Administration
- Diocese: Diocese of Oxford
- Deanery: Oxford
- Parish: North Hinksey with Botley Parish

Clergy
- Vicar: Rev. Clare Sykes

St Lawrence's Church is a Church of England church in North Hinksey, West Oxford, England. The church is dedicated to St Lawrence, a Christian martyr. It is a Grade II* Listed Building. The church has a chancel, nave and tower.

== Exterior construction and later modifications ==
The church building uses uncoursed limestone rubble with ashlar dressings and was originally constructed in the early Norman period (c. 1100CE). The roof uses stone tiles. The tower was originally constructed in the 13th century. The tower and south wall were rebuilt following their partial destruction during the English Civil War, c1670. Around 1850, a reproduction Norman chancel arch was constructed. In 1913, the church was restored by William Weir and Ernest Gimson. The restoration included an external drainage system which still functions. The east and south walls show clear signs of the 1913 repairs and the north wall shows remains of a former heating house.

== Church Interior ==
Interior of St Lawrence's, North Hinksey
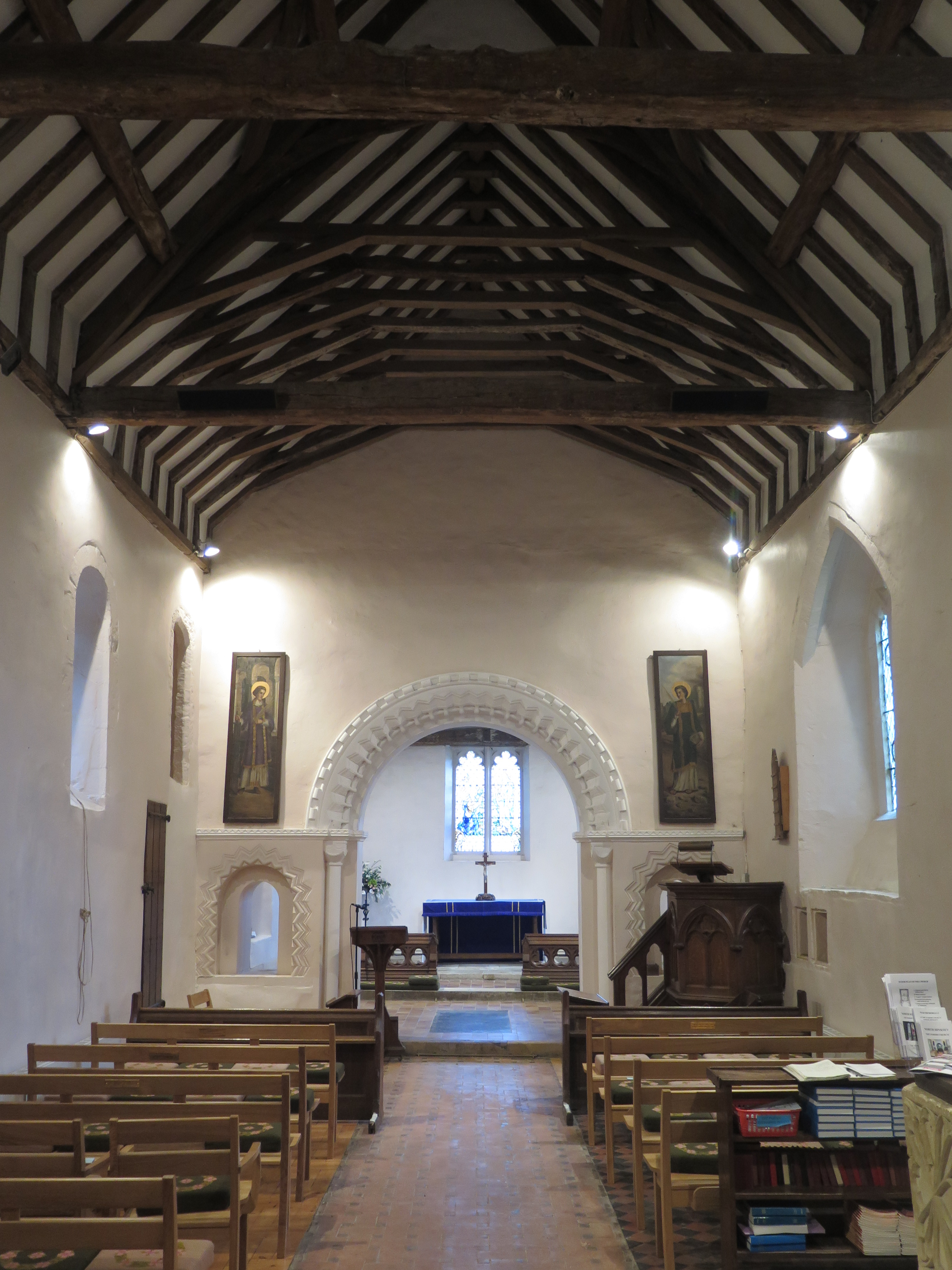
View from nave to chancel

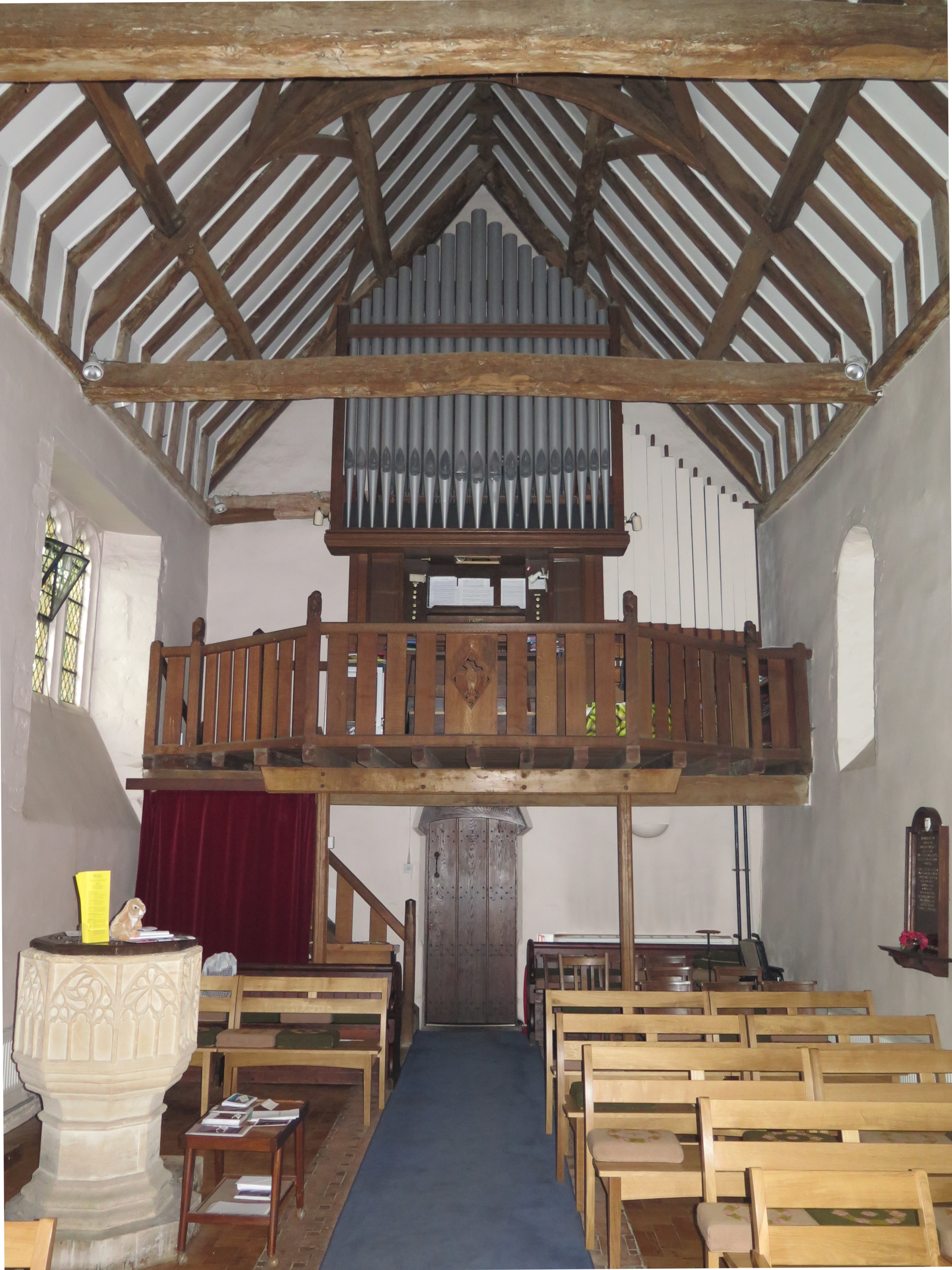
Organ loft

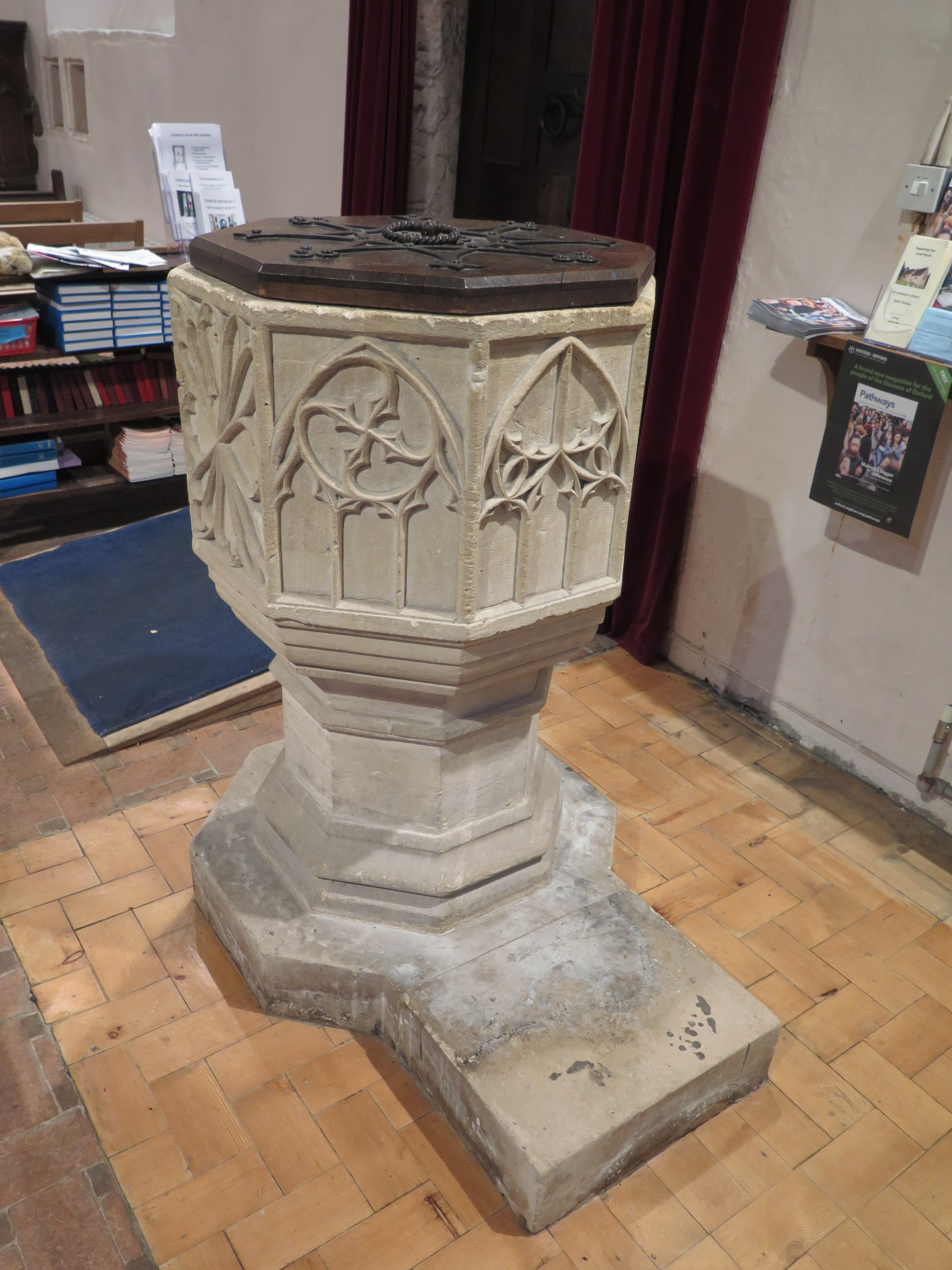
15th-century font

The chancel dates to the early 12th century. The nave is slightly later and was originally separated from the chancel by a narrow opening. This opening was replaced by a larger Norman style opening designed by John Macduff Der(r)ick around 1850. The chancel roof is supported by a 16th-century Queen Post roof truss. Sympathetic repairs to the roof truss were included in the 1913 restoration.

On the floor of the chancel is the historically important tombstone of the parents of Dr. Thomas Willis FRS, a famous resident of North Hinksey. Dr. Thomas Willis lived at Ferry Cottage through his schooldays, taking the ferry and walking to Oxford each day. His fame arises from his recognition as a pioneer in anatomy and pathophysiology due to his original multidisciplinary work in a clinical setting. In the 1913 restoration the stone was placed "as near as possible" to its original site. The inscription on the tomb reads, in part,

Underneath lye Interred THOMAS WILLIS Gent. and RACHELL his wife (Parents of ye famous physitian THOMAS WILLIS) She departed this life & was here buried July 5, 1631 And He (in Defence of ye Royal Cause at ye siege of Oxford) August 4, 1643.

The tombstone establishes the otherwise uncertain date of the death of Dr Thomas Willis' father, which was a significant event in his early career. The year of death actually predates the military engagements now known as the Siege of Oxford, but come after the Royalist forces withdrew to a defensive position at Oxford during the English Civil War.

The north wall of the nave is largely the original 12th-century construction, being very deep with small window openings. Other interiors walls were partially damaged during Civil War and rebuilt soon after. The doorway and staircase to the former rood loft (a reminder that the church was formally a Roman Catholic one) was reopened in 1913. The rood loft and rood were destroyed in the Reformation. The north wall also has a blocked up Norman doorway.

A door in south wall dates from the 12th century, and has a Norman beaker clasp carving which is reported in the Corpus of Romanesque Sculpture in Britain and Ireland. The external porch is original and is dated 1786. The north and west walls carry old wall paintings which have been painted over but are still protected.

In 1931 an organ loft was constructed by T. Lawrence Dale, with an organ by P G Phipps.

== Bell tower ==
The tower contains six bells, which are rung for Sunday services and, when requested, for events such as weddings. The bells at St Lawrence's are rung by change ringing rather than by striking with hammers. As is normal for church bells, the highest-pitched bell is called the "treble" and the lowest-pitched bell is called the "tenor". The other bells are numbered from "second" to "fifth".

The tower was rebuilt after damage during the English Civil War and four bells were installed. The inscription on the tenor shows that it was cast in 1614, before the Civil War, so it may have come from another church. By 1906 the tenor was considered to be unusable, so was re-cast (melted down and the metal used to make a new bell) by John Taylor & Co. By 1972, money had been raised for the treble and the second to be re-cast by the Whitechapel Bell Foundry. Two new bells were also added, using metal from a bell from South Hinksey. The two new bells became the treble and second, and the other bells were re-numbered accordingly. The inscriptions on the bells reads:

- Treble: The gift of Winifred Toynbee 1972
- Second: John W Larter B.C. Vicar. K.G.Goff and H Lockwood churchwardens 1972
- Third: Cast 1676 by Richard Keene of Woodstock. Recast 1972 by the Whitechapel Bell Foundry
- Fourth: 1681 Christopher Hodson made me. Recast 1972 by the Whitechapel Bell Foundry
- Fifth: RK 1675
- Tenor: William Yare made me 1614. Recast 1907

Winifred Toynbee was a local councillor and social worker.

== Windows ==
The church contains five painted glass windows.

Chancel south wall - Made in 1890 by Hardman & Co. This was donated to the church by the Reverend Cornish in memory of his sister Emily Louisa Cornish. It depicts the Wise Virgins in tribute to Emily, who was unmarried.

Chancel north wall - Made in 1890 by Hardman & Co. This was given by Mrs Jane Low of Dundee in memory of her son Alexander, who died age 19 and may have been a student at Oxford University. It depicts Eunice and her son, Saint Timothy.

Chancel east wall - Made by James Ballantyne Jr. of Edinburgh. It depicts the appearance of the Risen Christ to Mary Magdalene and makes good use of external light to impart a numinous quality to the figure of Christ, distinguishing him from the living Mary.

Nave south wall - Made in 1881 by Hardman & Co. This depicts the baptised Christ, with a dove bringing the Holy Spirit. Roundels show the Lamb of God, a pelican and sequences of letters representing Jesus.

Nave, north wall - Small window made of 15th-century glass recovered from the Western Front, 1920.

The south wall of the nave also has a small clear window at a height that allows people from outside to view the church service. It is not known whether this is intended for use by lepers, an anchorite or some other purpose. However, there was an anchorite near Hinksey in 1271, as provision was made in a will to support him.

Stained glass windows in St Lawrence's, North Hinksey
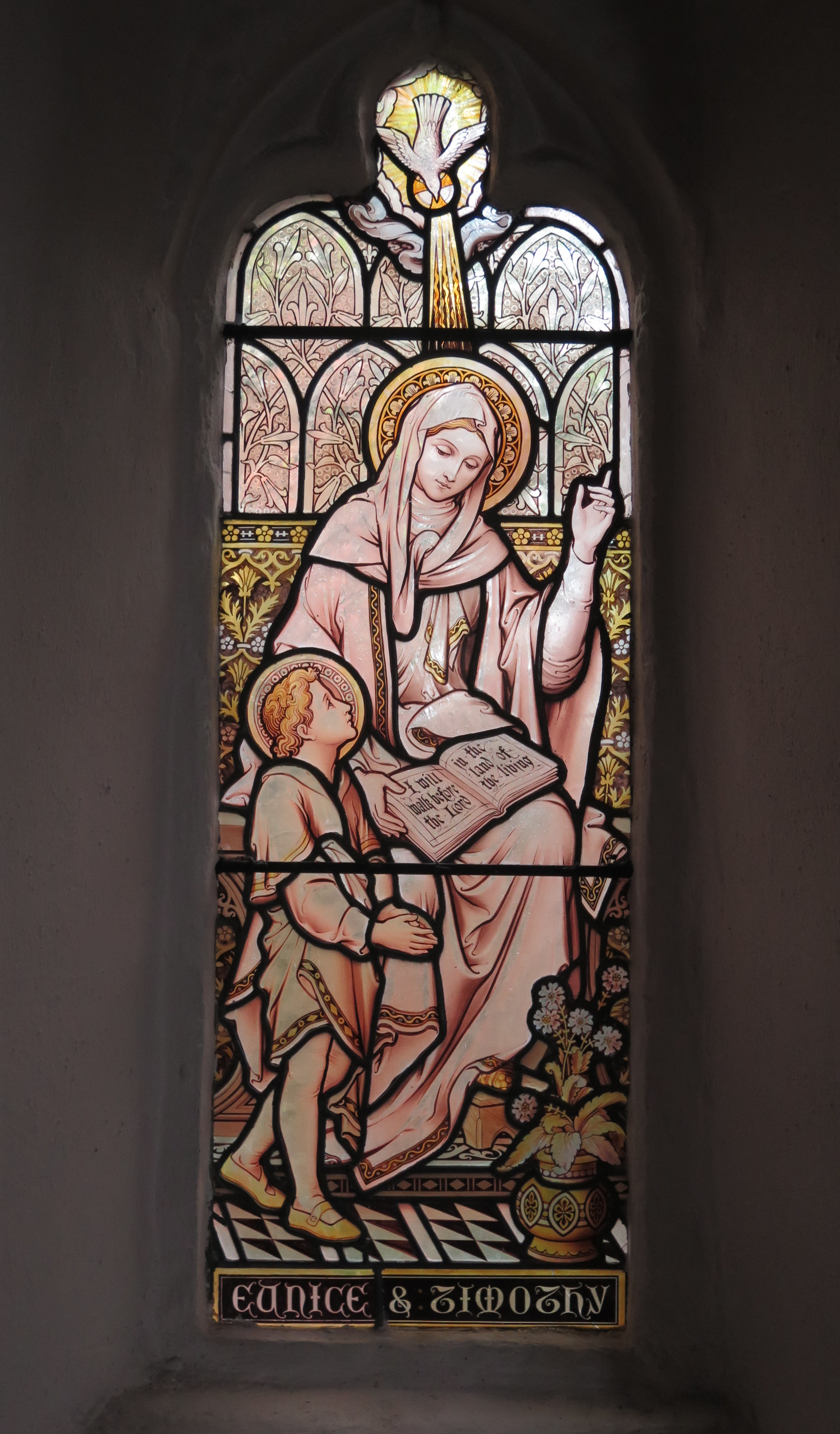
Chancel North wall window

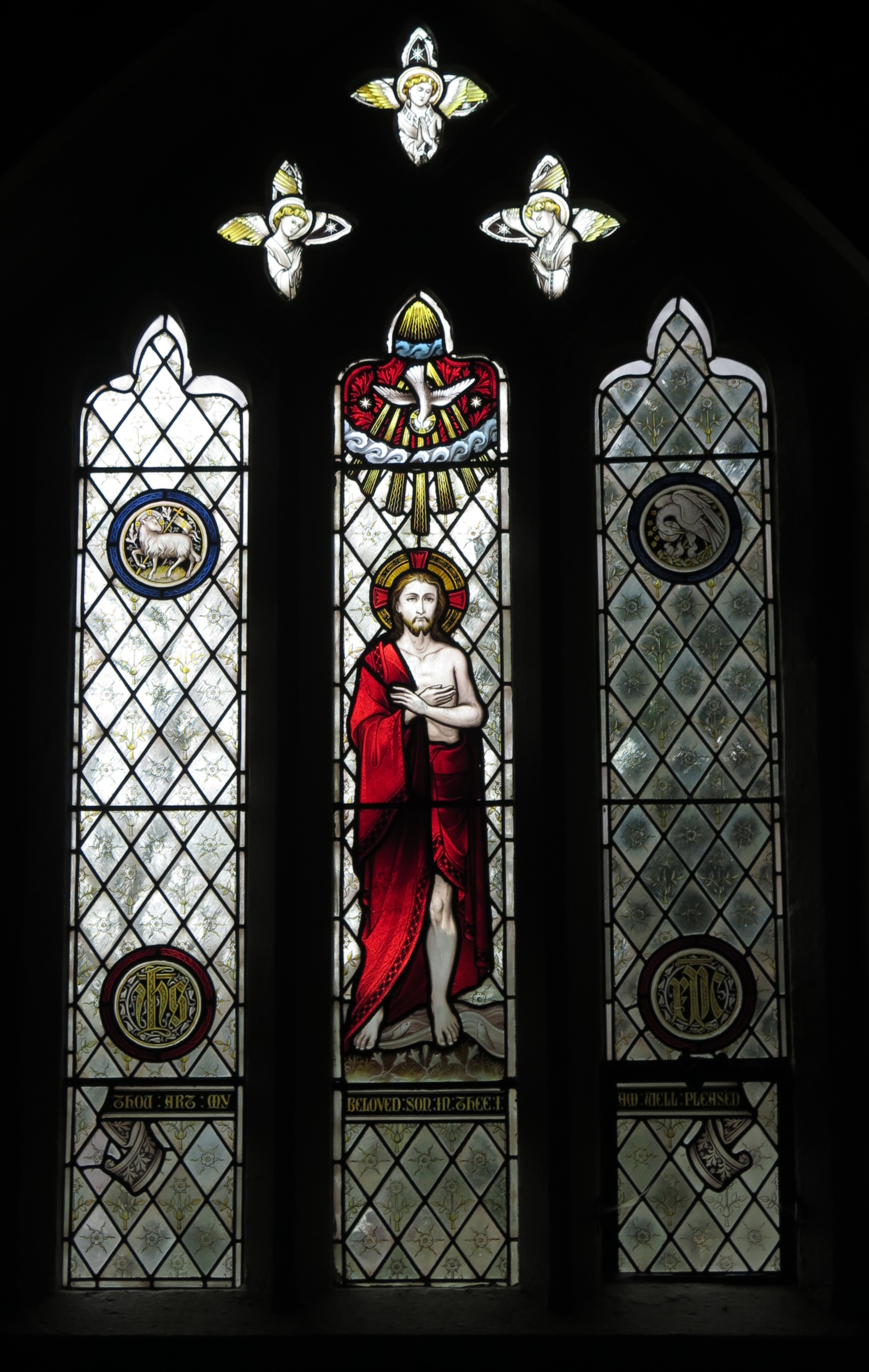
Nave South wall window

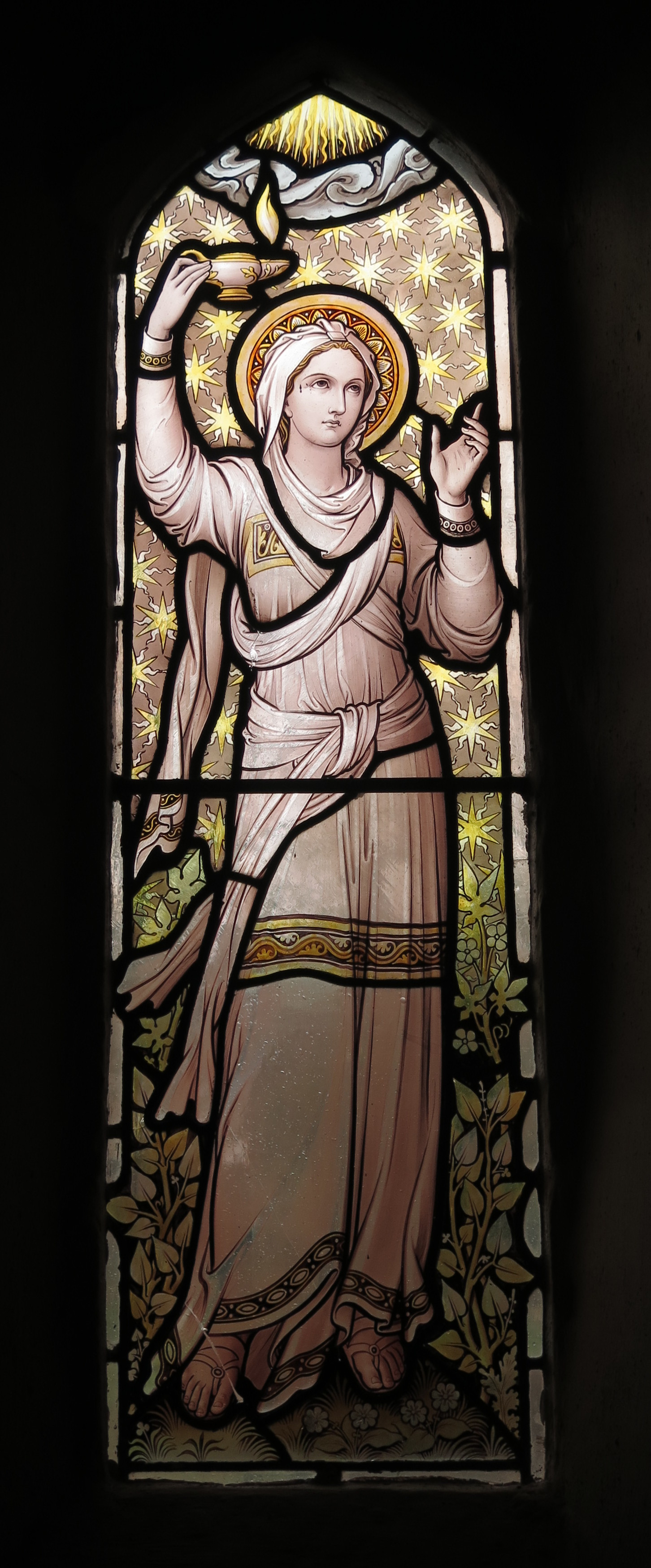
Chancel South wall window

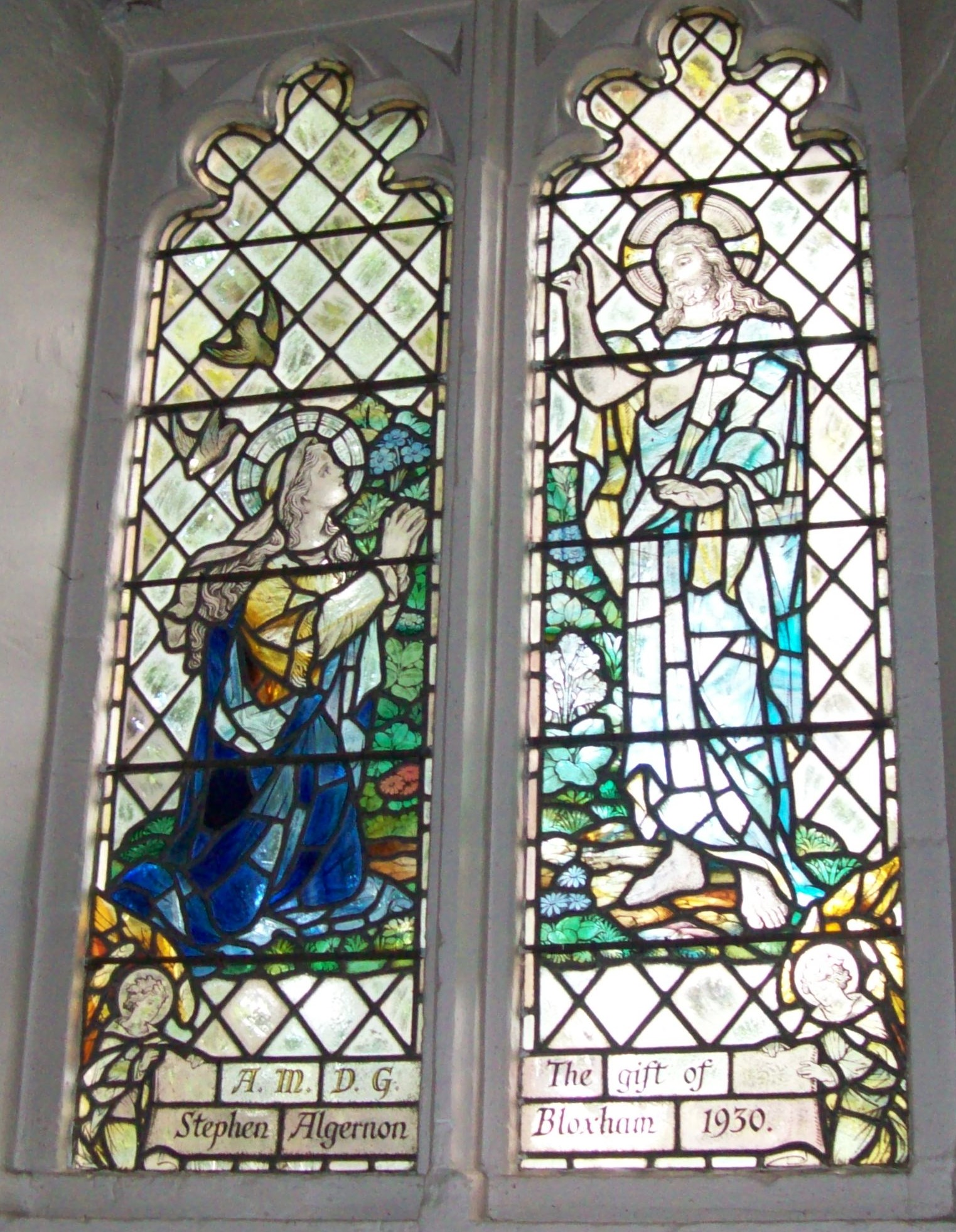
Chancel East wall window

== Notable features ==
The church and churchyard contain a number of interesting features. These include:

- A 12th-century carving to south door.
- A very richly carved wall tablet c.1678.
- Three doors by Ernest Gimson.
- A 15th-century carved stone font.
- Two wooden war memorials.

== Churchyard ==
Churchyard at St Lawrence's, North Hinksey
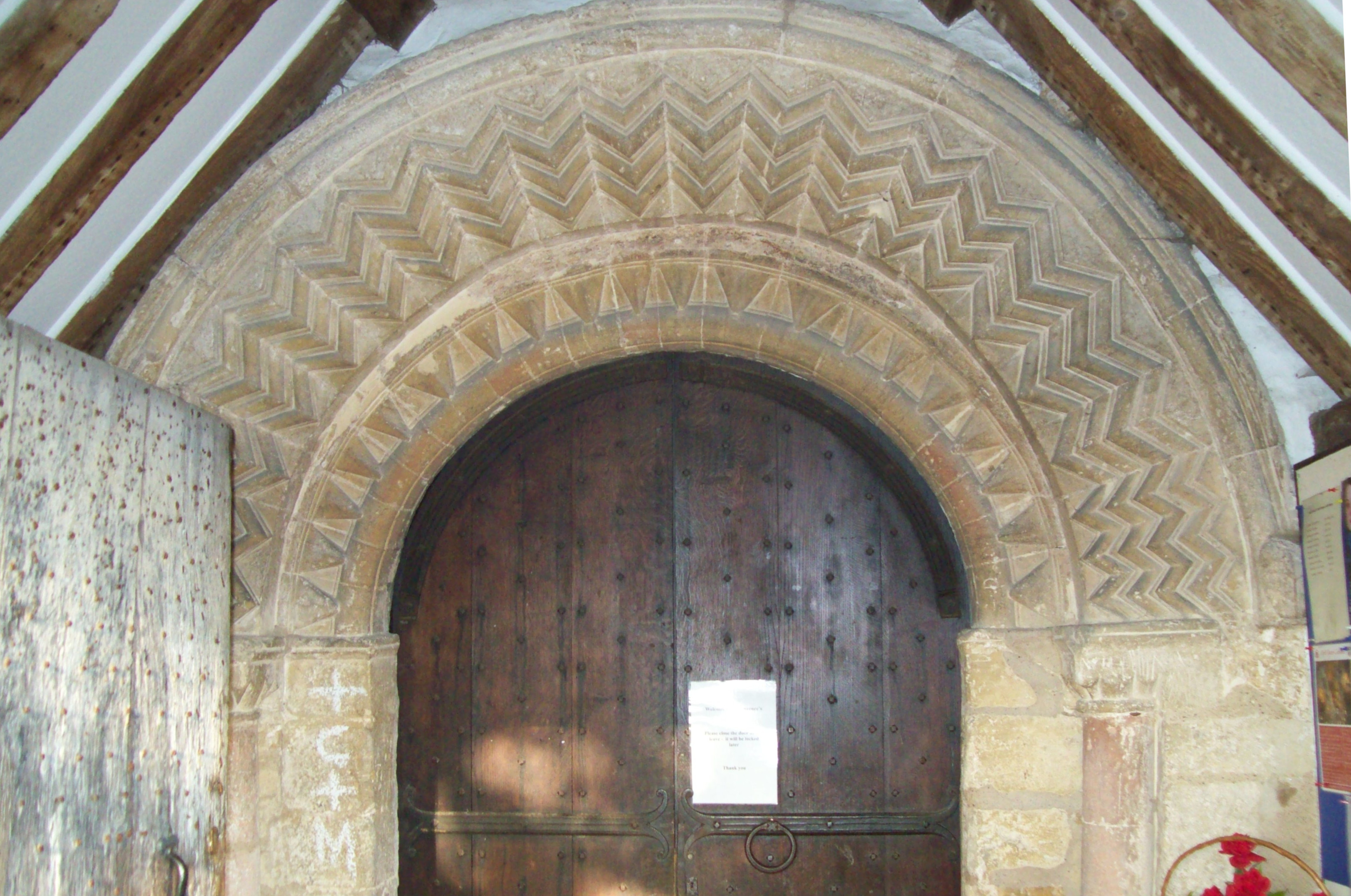
Carved door arch

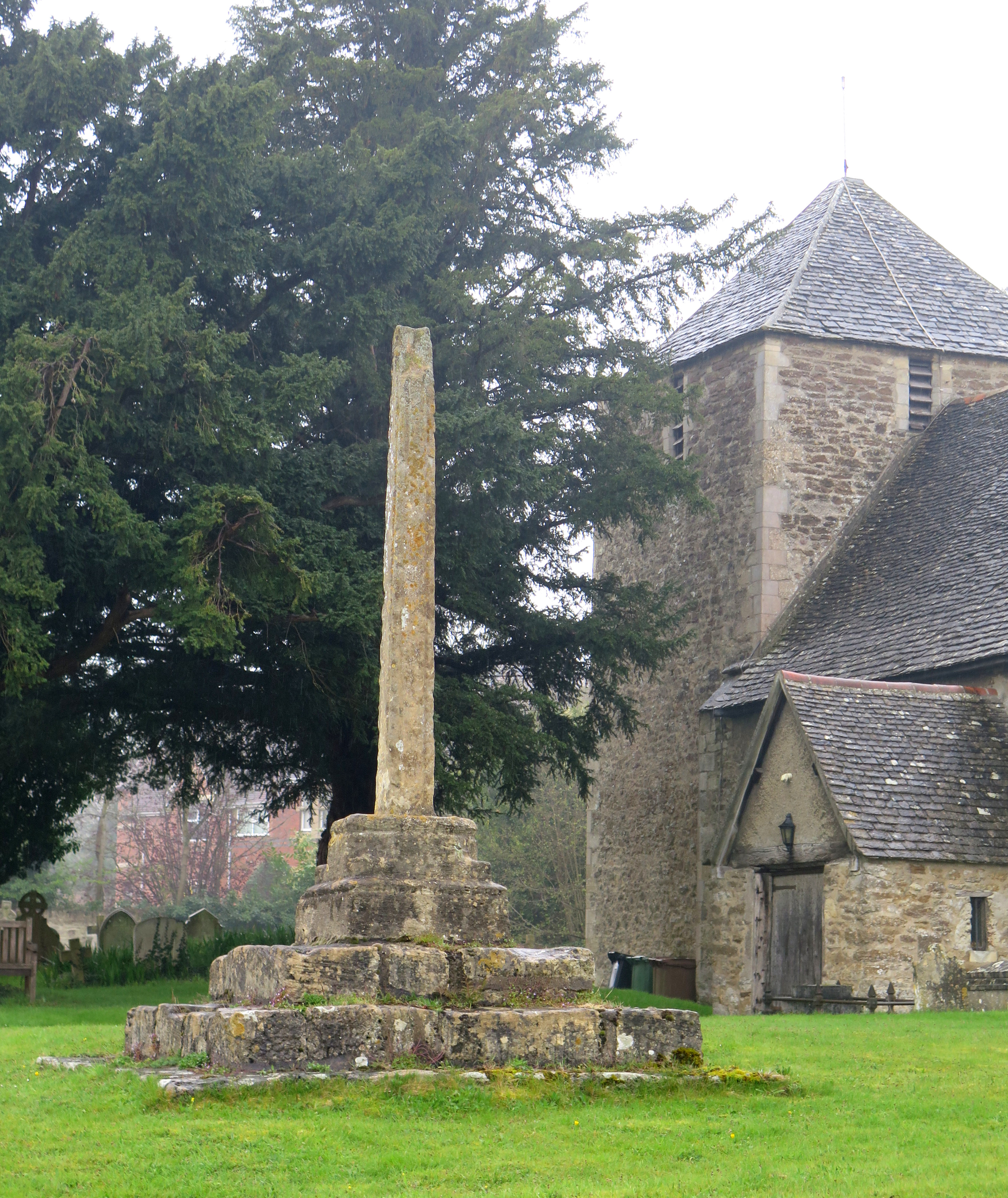
Broken Cross

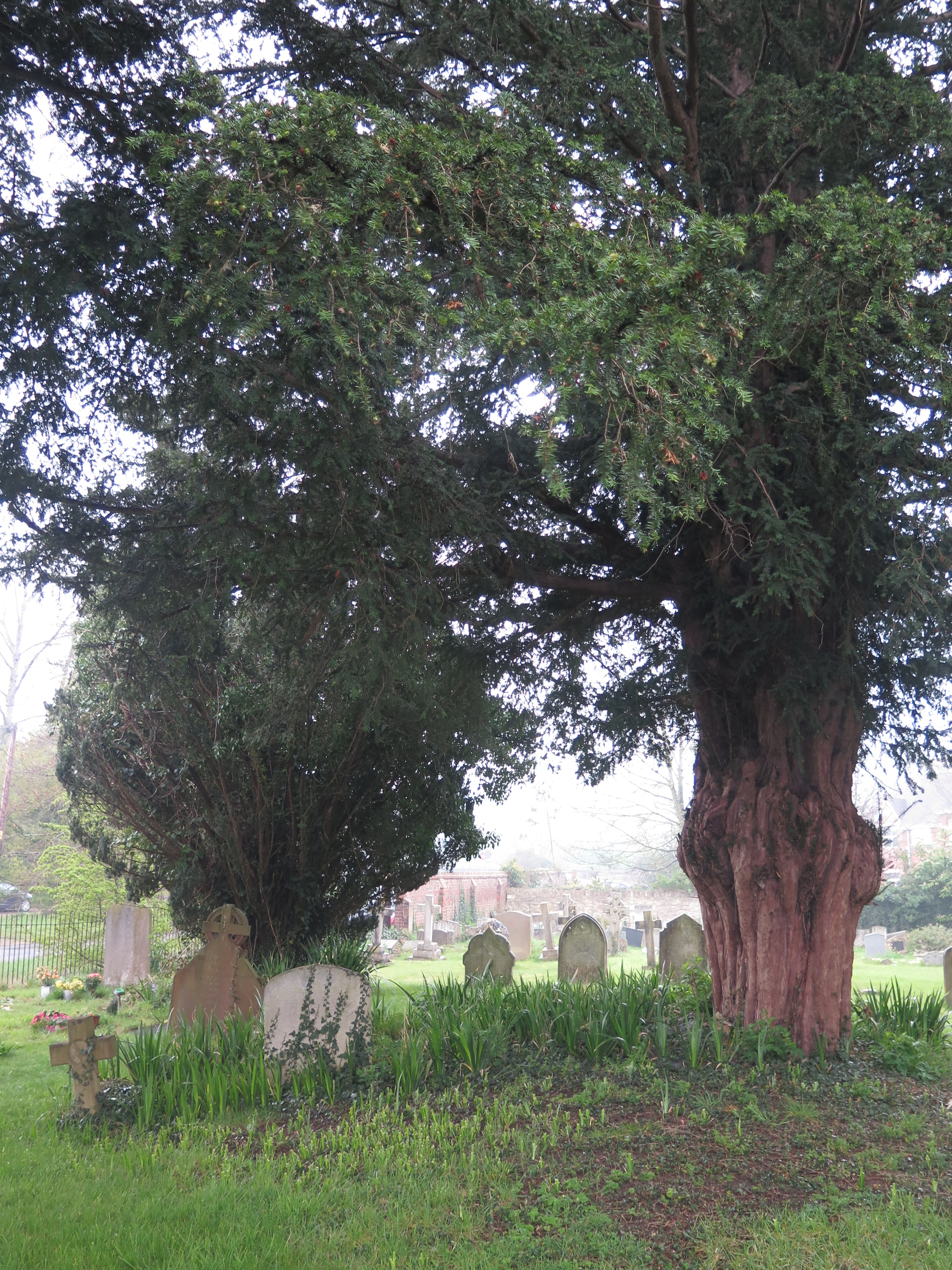
Gravestones

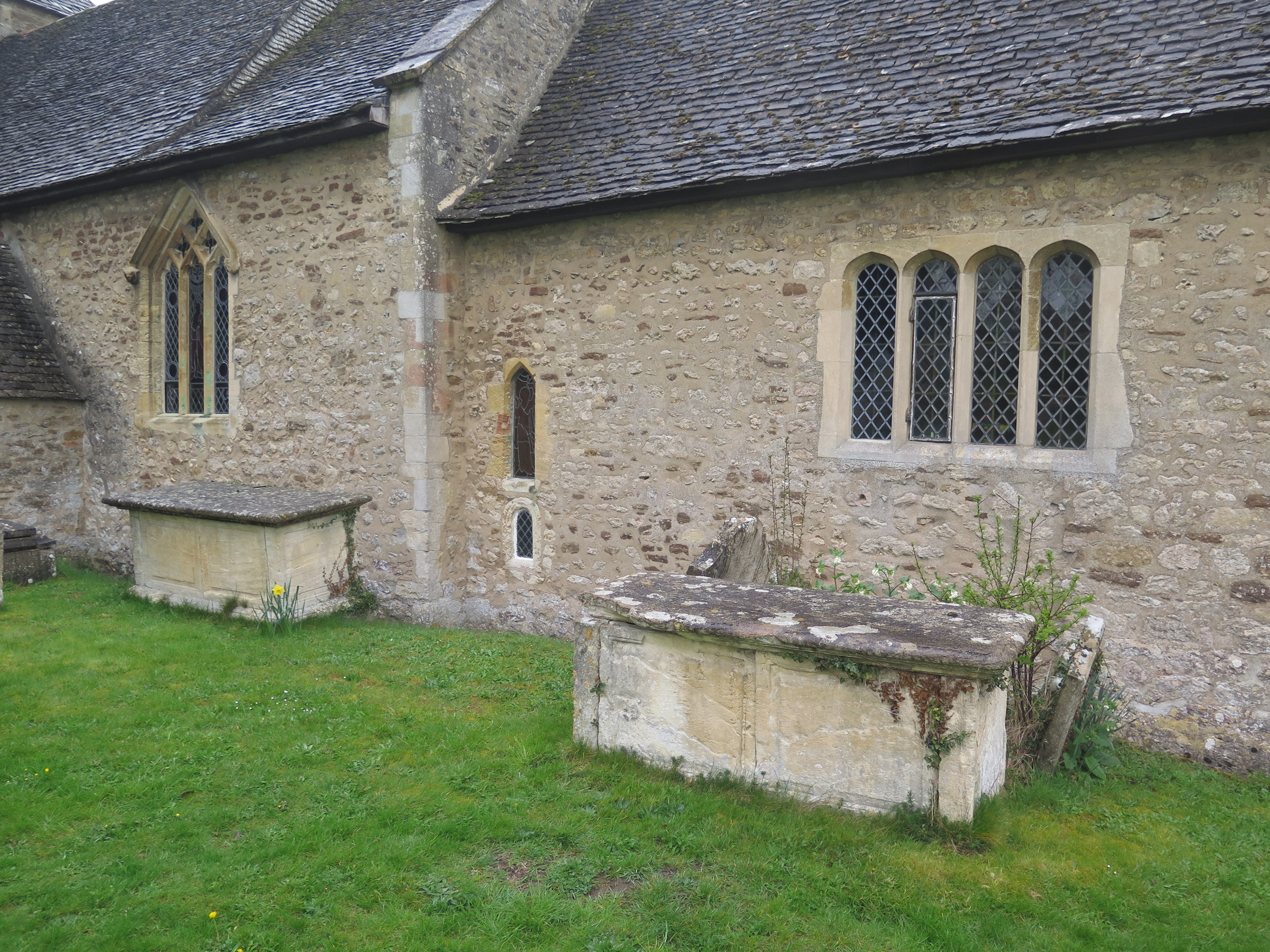
Chest tombs

The churchyard contains a number of graves, including a headstone maintained by the Commonwealth War Graves Commission for William Barson who died in World War I at the age of 17. The English scholar, Sir Walter Raleigh, was buried there in 1922. There are two chest tombs, both of which are Grade II listed. There is also the base of a churchyard cross, which is also Grade II listed. The cross is believed to have been built in the 12th or 13th century. At some point before 1800, the top part of the cross became detached and fragments of the cross were fixed to the east wall of the church. A piece of the top part of the cross was discovered at All Souls College, Oxford in 1983, where it had been used as part of 19th-century building work to block up a doorway. It is not known how this piece got to All Souls College, and the other pieces are lost.

== Bibliography ==
- Pevsner, N.; et al. (1951–74). The Buildings of England (46 vols.). Harmondsworth: Penguin Books.
