= A4074 road =

Road in England linking Reading and Oxford

A4074

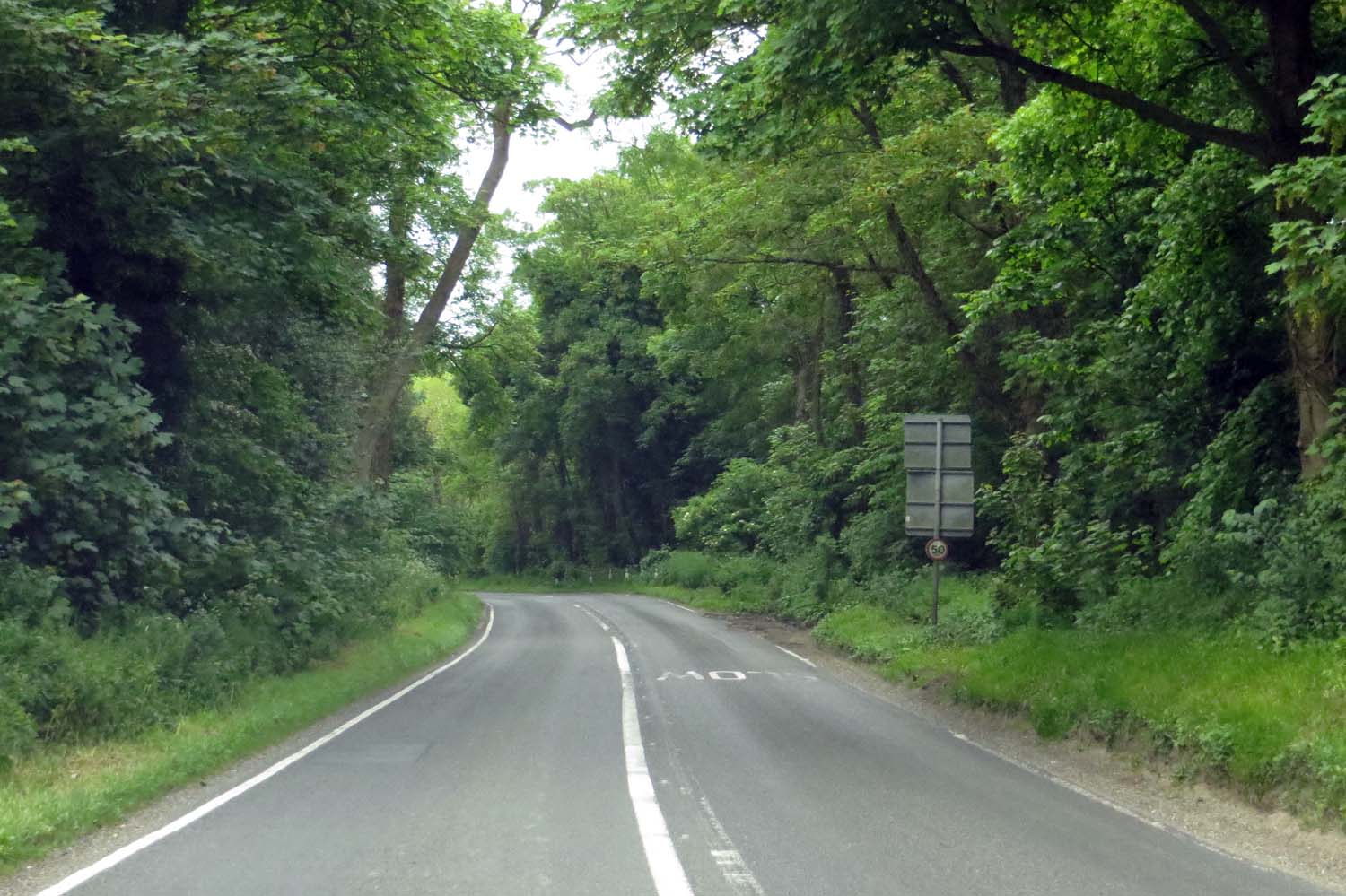
- The A4074 at Chazey Heath

Route information
- Length: 22 mi (35 km)

Major junctions
- South end: Caversham, Reading (51.4673°N 0.9767°W)
- North end: Heyford Hill, Iffley, Oxford (51.7214°N 1.2343°W)

Location
- Country: United Kingdom

Road network
- Roads in the United Kingdom; Motorways; A and B road zones
← A4071	→ A4075

The A4074 is a British A road from the Reading suburb of Caversham to the Heyford Hill roundabout on the Oxford Ring Road.

The road starts from a junction with the A4155 close to the northern side of Caversham Bridge (over the River Thames) before climbing through the up-market residential area of Caversham Heights. Crossing the Reading Borough boundary, the road proceeds through the small community of Chazey Heath, where it enters thick woodland for several miles before emerging near the village of Woodcote. From here it crosses the more exposed ground of the Chiltern Hills before bypassing both Wallingford and Crowmarsh Gifford on the Wallingford bypass. It then passes by Benson, passes through Shillingford, bypasses Dorchester and passes through Nuneham Courtenay. The road becomes dual-carriageway as it passes Sandford-on-Thames and remains so to its terminus on the Oxford Ring Road at the Heyford Hill roundabout.

The road was designated in the 1980s, when the B479 between Caversham and Crowmarsh Gifford was renumbered. In 1990 the A423 from Crowmarsh to Heyford Hill was renumbered the A4074, and the road became the primary route between Reading and Oxford in place of the A329 along the River Thames. The short stretch of the Oxford Ring Road between Heyford Hill and the Hinksey Hill interchange was not renumbered A4074, and remains an isolated fragment of the A423.

The poor safety record of a particular stretch of this road, roughly between Chazey Heath and Woodcote, is highlighted in its local nickname, The 13 Bends of Death. Its accident rate of 53 per 100 million vehicle kilometres is nearly 70% higher than average for roads of its type.
