= A423 road =

Road in England

Coordinates: 52.22363°N 1.3878°W

A423

Route information
- Length: 22.4 mi (36.0 km)

Major junctions
- South end: Banbury
- A361 A422 A425 A426 A445; A45
- North end: Near Coventry

Location
- Country: United Kingdom

Road network
- Roads in the United Kingdom; Motorways; A and B road zones
← A422	→ A424

The A423 road is a primary A road in England in two sections. The main section leads from central Banbury to the A45 near Coventry.

== Route ==
It starts in Banbury town centre as Southam Road and goes through the Southam Road Industrial Estate, then just north of Banbury it crosses over the M40, from there it passes close to several Warwickshire villages until it becomes part of the Southam by-pass, it then goes through Long Itchington and Marton before merging with the A45 near Ryton.

The other section of the A423 is part of the Oxford Ring Road between the A34 Hinksey Hill interchange and the A4142/A4074 Heyford Hill roundabout, a distance of 1.4 miles (2.3 km). The section, carrying 50,000 vehicles per day, includes a bridge over the Cherwell Valley railway line and Hinksey Stream. The bridge is in need of replacement which is expected to cost £90 million with work starting in 2023 and completion in 2026. The replacement will include work for the Oxford Flood Alleviation Scheme, a bus lane and improvements in pedestrian and cyclist facilities.

== History ==
Its original route when first classified in 1922 was from Tamworth in Staffordshire to Oxford, terminating at Two Gates on the old A5. The road north continued as the A51. In the 1930s the route was extended from Oxford to Maidenhead in Berkshire, over parts of the former routes of the A42 and A415. A curious feature of the route was a 3-mile (4.8 km) gap between Benson, Oxfordshire and a point 1.2 miles (1.9 km) north west of Nuffield, which resulted from the construction of RAF Benson across the line of the road. The detour though Crowmarsh Gifford was designated the B479 and A4130 rather than A423.

The last section of the Oxford Ring Road was completed in 1965, and the A423 was rerouted away from the centre of Oxford to form part of the ring road. From 1971 to 1990 the A423 joined the then A423(M) motorway at Maidenhead.

On the completion of the M42 motorway in the early 1980s, the phase of the A423 between Tamworth and Coventry became the A51 (to the A47 junction), B4098 between the A47 and Keresley and A4170 into Coventry. Subsequently, the A51 was curtailed at Kingsbury with the B4098 extending along the A4170 into Coventry City Centre.

The final downgrading came in 1990 when the M40 motorway between Oxford and Birmingham was completed. The remainder of the route south of Banbury was renumbered to become parts of the A4260, A4074 and A4130, except for the part of the Oxford Ring Road between the A34 Hinksey Hill interchange and the A4142/A4074 Heyford Hill roundabout. On this stretch of road, heading eastbound, drivers will notice the distance sign showing the name A423 and its original final destination of Maidenhead. Traffic for Maidenhead is now directed onto the A40/ M40 via High Wycombe.
