= South Hinksey =

Village in Oxfordshire, England

Coordinates: 51.736°N 1.264°W

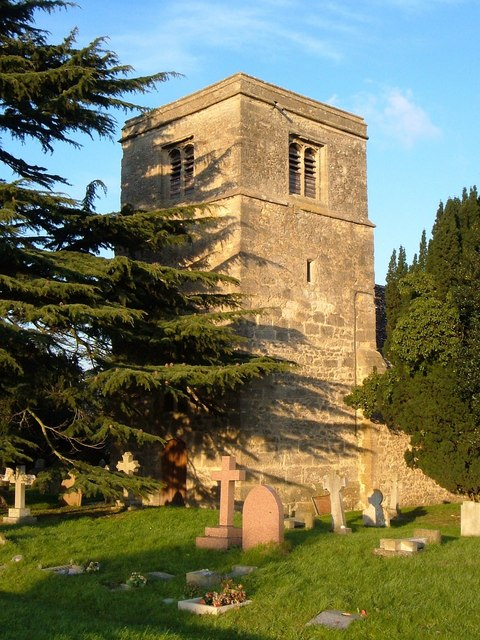
- Tower of St Laurence's parish church

- Location within Oxfordshire
- Population: 383 (2001 census)
- OS grid reference: SP5004
- Civil parish: South Hinksey
- District: Vale of White Horse
- Shire county: Oxfordshire
- Region: South East
- Country: England
- Sovereign state: United Kingdom
- Post town: Oxford
- Postcode district: OX1
- Dialling code: 01865
- Police: Thames Valley
- Fire: Oxfordshire
- Ambulance: South Central
- UK Parliament: Oxford West and Abingdon
- Website: This is South Hinksey, Oxfordshire England

South Hinksey is a village and civil parish just over 1 mile (1.6 km) south of the centre of Oxford. The parish includes the residential area of Hinksey Hill about 0.5 miles (800 m) south of the village.

== Geography ==
The Southern By-Pass Road (part of the A34) passes through the parish. The only road access to the village is via the bypass. It is on the inside of the ring road and close to the Hinksey Stream, a branch of the River Thames at Oxford.

Pedestrian and cycle access to the village from Oxford is via the Devil's Backbone; a historic raised pathway across the neighbouring flood plains. In his poem The Scholar Gipsy, Matthew Arnold describes the rural scenes around Oxford, the Devil's Backbone footpath connecting South Hinksey is mentioned as a charming walk.

The parish was part of Berkshire until the 1974 boundary changes transferred it to Oxfordshire.

== History ==
South Hinksey was first recorded as a settlement in the late 7th century when King Cædwalla of Wessex granted the land to Abingdon Abbey (c. 685–688).

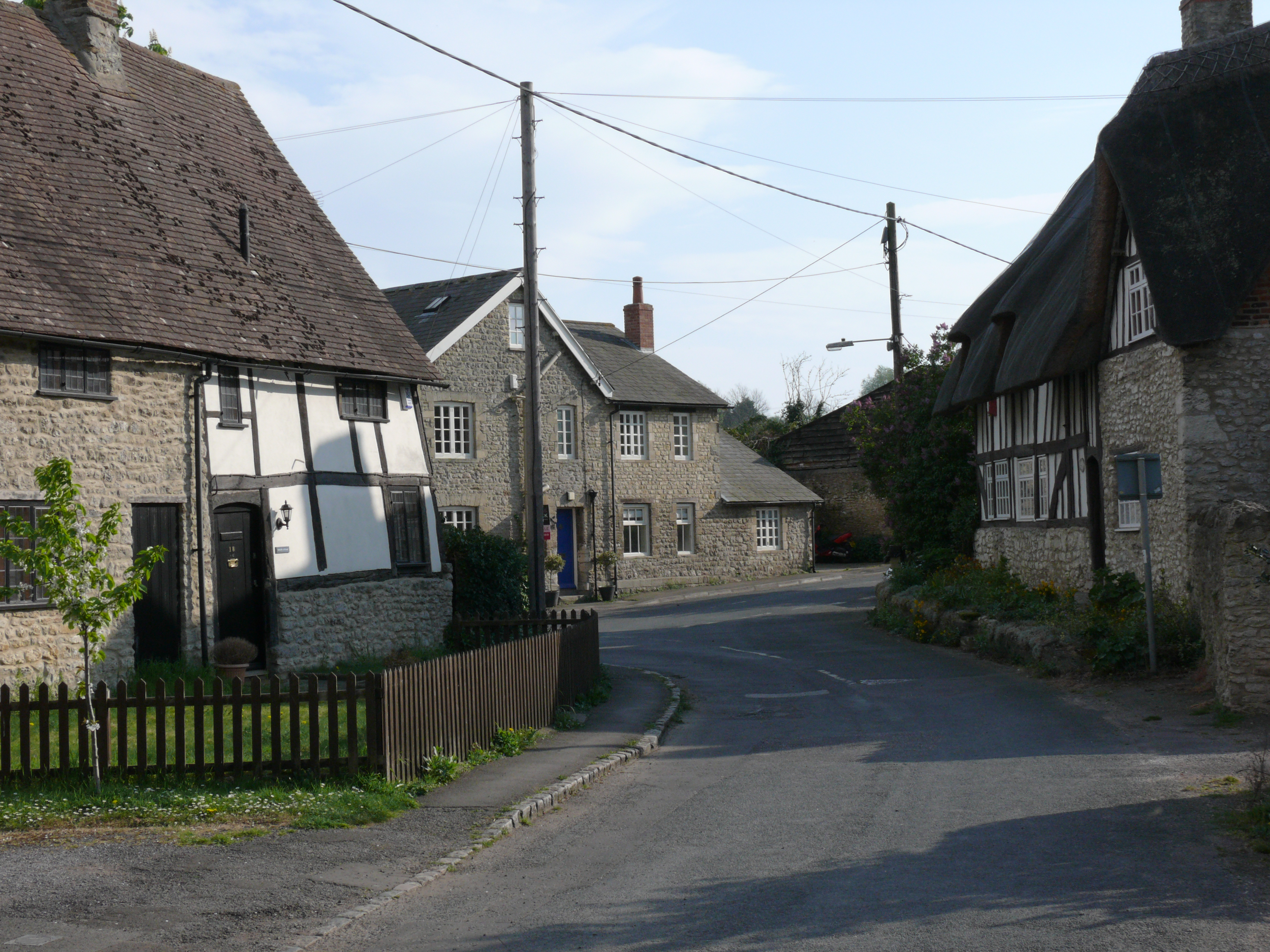
Cottages in South Hinksey. In the centre is the former Cross Keys pub.

It has always been difficult to get between North Hinksey to the north-west and South Hinksey. In the 19th century John Ruskin tried to organize the making of a road between the two villages, as the ground between them was very boggy. Since the 1930s they have been connected by the Southern By-Pass Road. Until the middle of the 18th century South Hinksey was in the parish of Cumnor. When it was first created, the parish extended to the River Thames, but in 1889 the new suburb of New Hinksey, between the Thames and Hinksey Stream, was transferred to the City of Oxford. However, the ecclesiastical parish continues to include New Hinksey.

South Hinksey had two pubs, the Cross Keys which closed in 1993, and the General Elliot, which finally closed in 2016.

== St Laurence's Church ==
St Laurence's Church (sometimes spelled St Lawrence) is the Church of England parish church of South Hinksey. It is a medieval church dating from the 13th century with Norman (12th-century) origins. The building is Grade II* listed for its architectural and historic significance.The building is constructed of uncoursed limestone rubble with ashlar stone dressings, and it retains a traditional layout of nave, chancel, and west tower. The nave walls are 13th-century and have several original lancet windows.

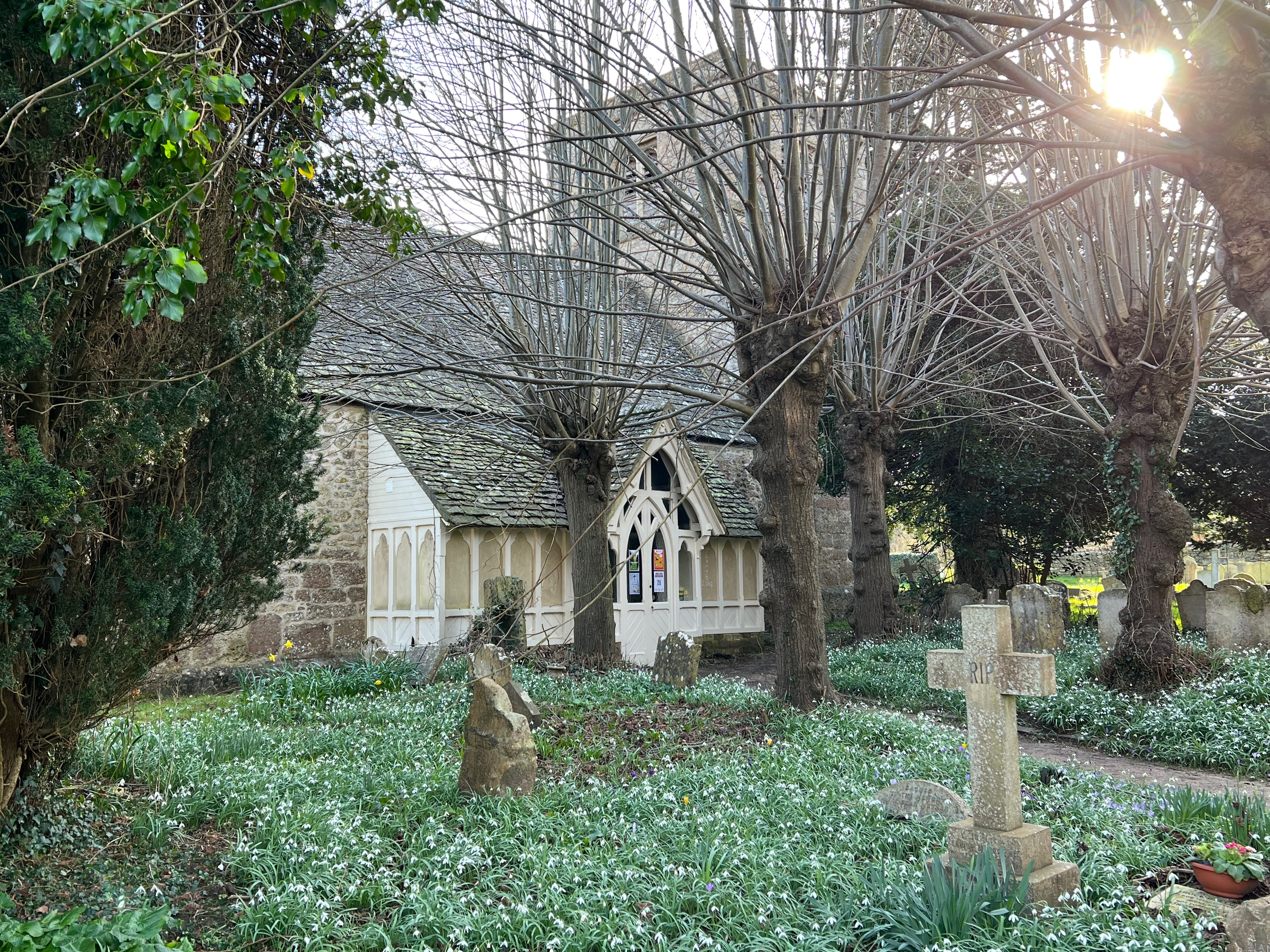
Entrance to the Church of St Laurence on an early spring afternoon

St Laurence's is modestly sized but rich in historic detail. Above the pulpit, a stained glass window of St Laurence is fitted in the north wall, depicting the 3rd-century martyrdom of the church's patron saint. The church contains a large rood screen and loft at the chancel arch – a high wooden screen with a cross and figures, installed in the 20th century to emulate the medieval rood that would have been there originally. St Laurence's Church retains its picturesque historic character, with its weathered stones, timber porch, and ivy-clad walls encapsulating the feel of a rural medieval church.

The church has notable personal connections: John Piers, who became Archbishop of York in 1589, was born in South Hinksey and would have been baptised at St Laurence's. John Towle, later Mayor of Oxford, was married at St Laurence's in 1828.

In addition, St Laurence's Church has continuously been a site of local importance. It has hosted countless baptisms, weddings, and funerals of ordinary villagers whose names do not appear in history books but for whom the church was a central part of life.

== See also ==
- Hinksey
- Hinksey Stream
- New Hinksey
- North Hinksey

== Sources ==
- Page, W.H.; Ditchfield, P.H., eds. (1924). A History of the County of Berkshire, Volume 4. Victoria County History. pp. 408–410.
- Pevsner, Nikolaus (1966). Berkshire. The Buildings of England. Harmondsworth: Penguin Books. p. 222.
