= William Turner (painter) =

English painter (1789–1862)

William Turner RWS
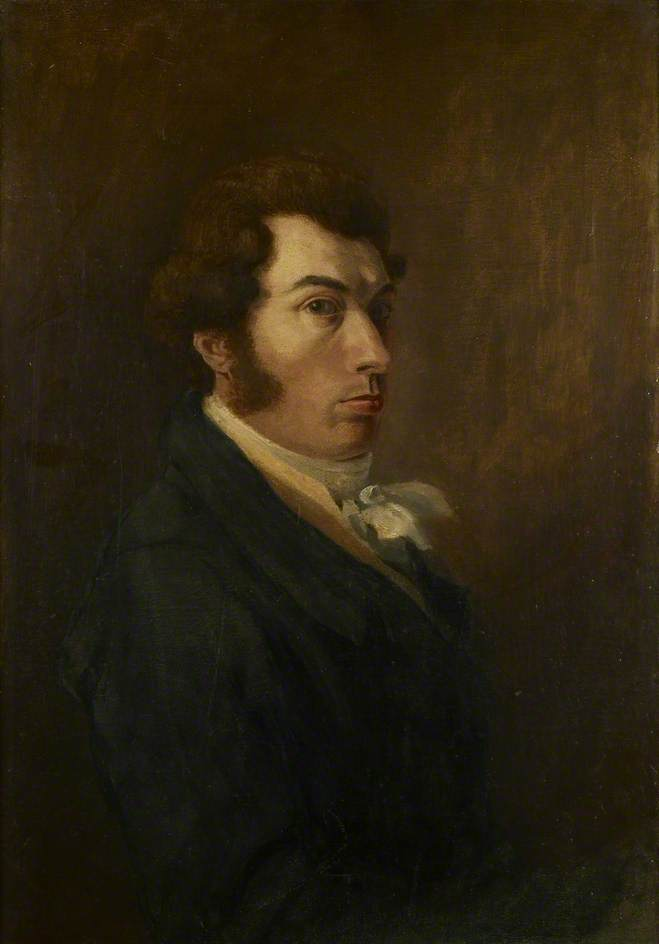
- Self-portrait, c. 1824
- Born: 29 November 1789; Black Bourton, Oxfordshire, England
- Died: 7 August 1862 (aged 72); St John Street, Oxford, England
- Known for: Watercolours
- Notable work: Oxford from Hinksey Hill (c.1840)

William Turner RWS (29 November 1789 – 7 August 1862) was a British painter who specialised in watercolour landscapes. He is often known as William Turner of Oxford or just Turner of Oxford to distinguish him from his contemporary, J. M. W. Turner (known as William). Many of Turner's paintings depicted the countryside around the city of Oxford. One of his best-known pictures is a view of Oxford from Hinksey Hill.

In 1898, the Ashmolean Museum in Oxford held a retrospective exhibition of his work. Some of his paintings are still on permanent display at the museum. In 1984, the Oxfordshire County Council presented his work in an exhibition at the Oxfordshire County Museum in Woodstock. His paintings are also held in national and international collections, for example at the Tate Gallery (London, UK), the Metropolitan Museum of Art (New York City, US), and the Dunedin Public Art Gallery (New Zealand).

== Life ==
Turner was born at Black Bourton, Oxfordshire. He was the eldest of three children and had two younger sisters. His father died in 1791, and he was raised during this early part of his life by his mother. In 1803, he went to live with his uncle, also called William Turner. Initially they lived in Burford but in 1804 moved to the manor house at Shipton-on-Cherwell in Oxfordshire.

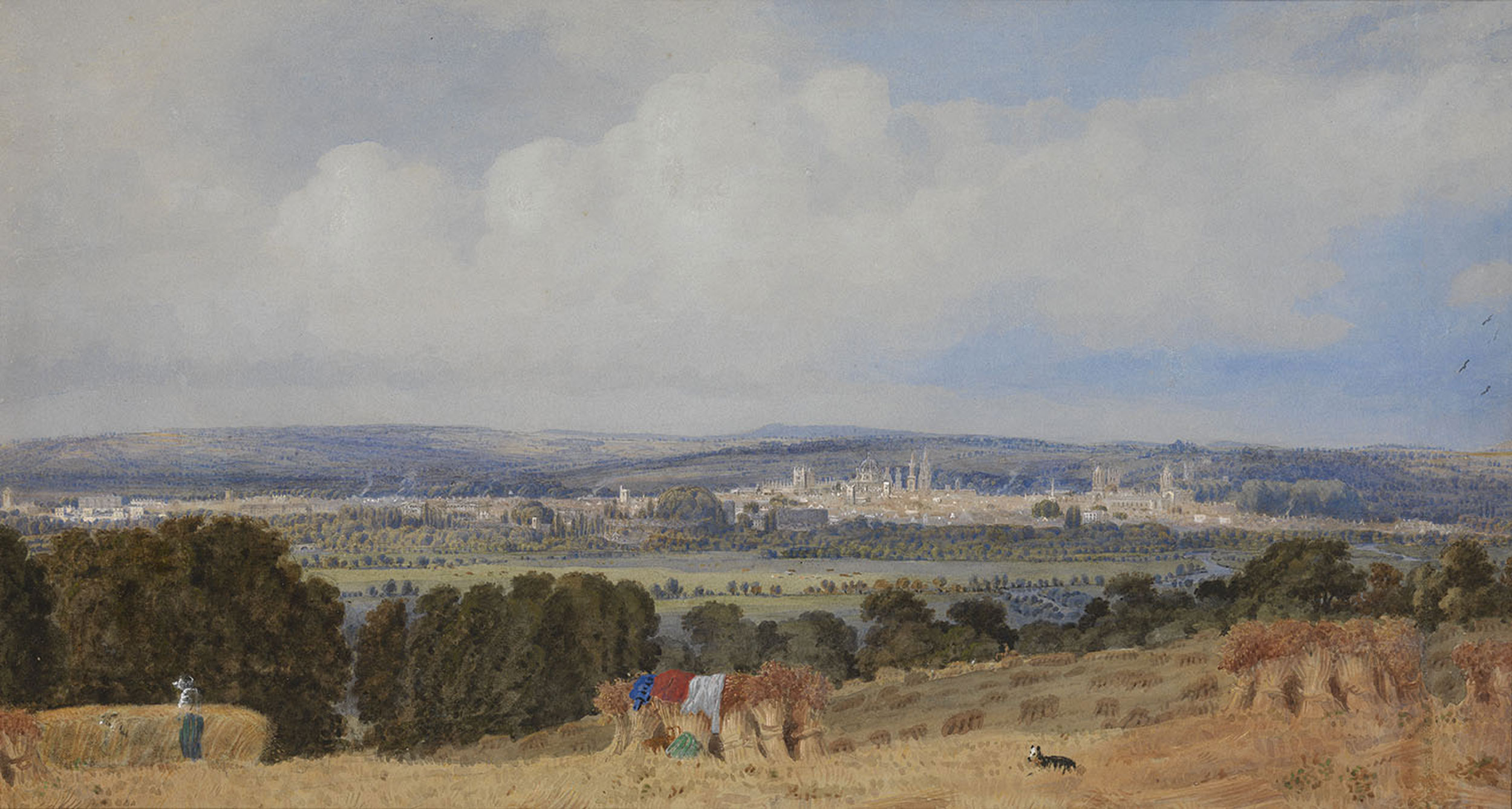
Oxford from Hinksey Hill, painted c. 1840 by William Turner of Oxford (private collection)

Because of his interest in drawing, Turner joined John Varley in London. In 1807, he had his first exhibition at the Royal Academy. He was elected as a full member of the Royal Watercolour Society in 1808, and for the rest of his life participated in their yearly exhibitions.

In 1810, Turner returned to Oxfordshire. He lived in Woodstock until 1811. After that, he lived in and around Oxford. In 1824, Turner married Elizabeth Ilott at Shipton-on-Cherwell and lived at London Road, St Clement's. From 1833 onwards, he lived at 16 St John Street in central Oxford.

In 1831, the parish church at Shipton-on-Cherwell was demolished, and a Georgian Gothic Revival church designed in a Decorated Gothic style by William Turner was built in its place.

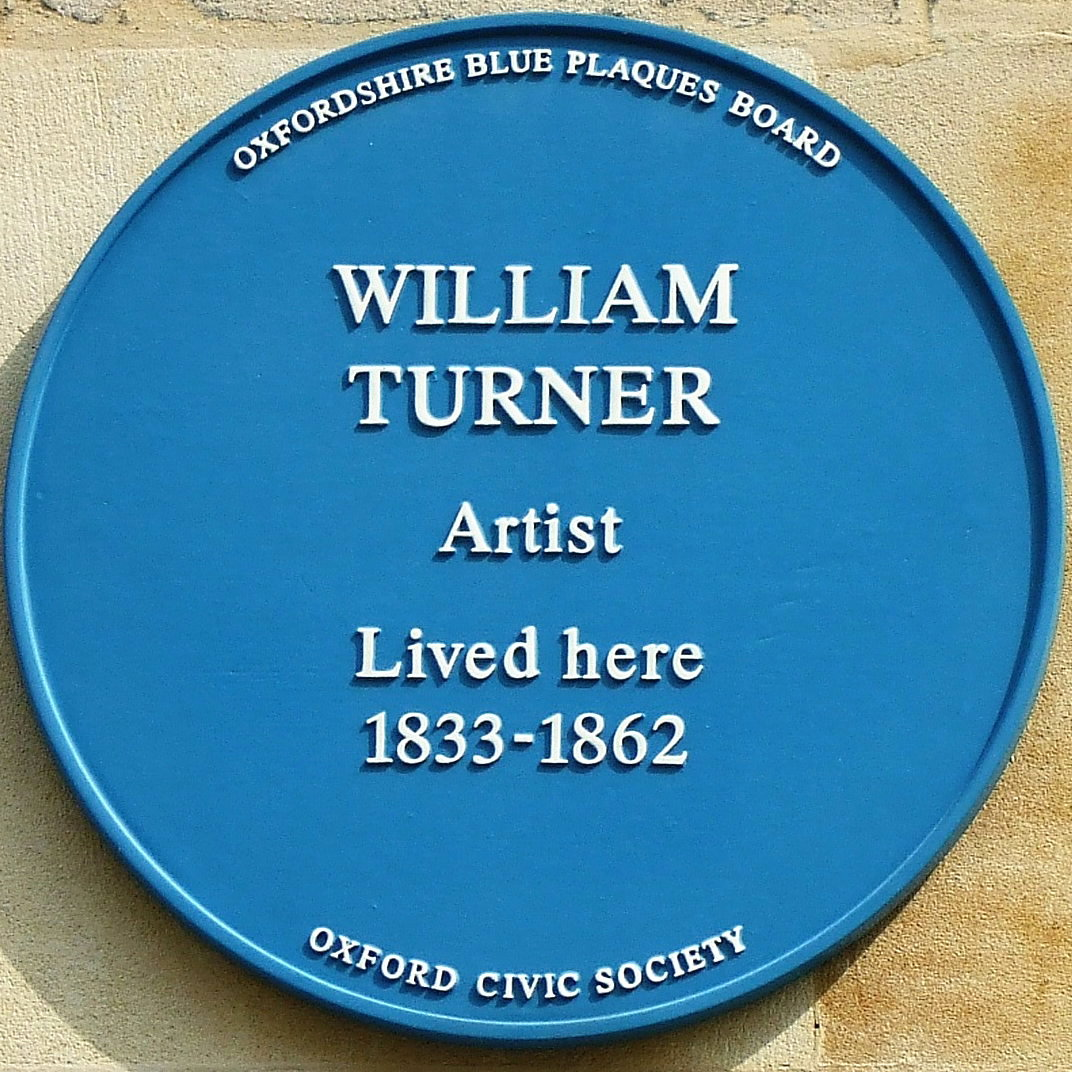
Blue plaque for William Turner in St John Street, Oxford

Turner died at his home in St John Street, Oxford, in 1862. A blue plaque marks the house where he lived. William and his wife are buried in Holy Cross parish churchyard at Shipton-on-Cherwell. In 1896, a memorial chancel screen was installed in the church, with a brass plaque reading "Erected in memory of William Turner of Oxford, Water Colour Painter and architect of this church."
