= New Hinksey =

Suburb of Oxford, England

Coordinates: 51.737°N 1.254°W

- Location within Oxfordshire
- OS grid reference: SP516045
- Civil parish: unparished
- District: Oxford
- Shire county: Oxfordshire
- Region: South East
- Country: England
- Sovereign state: United Kingdom
- Post town: Oxford
- Postcode district: OX1
- Dialling code: 01865
- Police: Thames Valley
- Fire: Oxfordshire
- Ambulance: South Central
- UK Parliament: Oxford East

New Hinksey is a suburb in the south of the city of Oxford.

== Geography ==
The suburb is west of the Abingdon Road (A4144). To the north is Grandpont and to the east, over Donnington Bridge, which crosses the River Thames, is Cowley. To the west is the railway line between Oxford and Didcot Parkway and beyond that Hinksey Stream, a branch of the River Thames.

== Amenities ==
The original Church of England parish church of Saint John the Evangelist was designed by the Gothic Revival architect EG Bruton and built in 1870. In 1900 it was demolished and replaced by one designed by the Scots architects William Bucknall and Ninian Comper. New Hinksey Church of England Primary School is on Vicarage Road, beside St. John the Evangelist church. There is a large outdoor public swimming pool in Hinksey Park between New Hinksey and Grandpont.

== History ==
The suburb of New Hinksey was developed in the 19th century. Until then the area was covered by water meadows. New Hinksey was in Berkshire, in the parish of South Hinksey, until 1889, when it was absorbed into the city of Oxford. It remained in the ecclesiastical parish of South Hinksey, which is now called the parish of South with New Hinksey.

== Sources ==
- Eleanor Chance; Christina Colvin; Janet Cooper; C.J. Day; T.G. Hassall; Nesta Selwyn (1979). Crossley, Alan; Elrington, C.R. (eds.). Victoria County History: A History of the County of Oxford, Volume 4.
- Page, William; Ditchfield, P.H., eds. (1924). Victoria County History: A History of the County of Berkshire, Volume 4. pp. 408–410.
- Sherwood, Jennifer; Pevsner, Nikolaus (1974). The Buildings of England: Oxfordshire. Harmondsworth: Penguin Books. p. 335. ISBN 0-14-071045-0.
