= Harcourt Hill =

Coordinates: 51.739°N 1.293°W

- Location within Oxfordshire
- OS grid reference: SP4904
- Civil parish: North Hinksey
- District: Vale of White Horse
- Shire county: Oxfordshire
- Region: South East
- Country: England
- Sovereign state: United Kingdom
- Post town: Oxford
- Postcode district: OX2
- Dialling code: 01865
- Police: Thames Valley
- Fire: Oxfordshire
- Ambulance: South Central
- UK Parliament: Oxford West and Abingdon

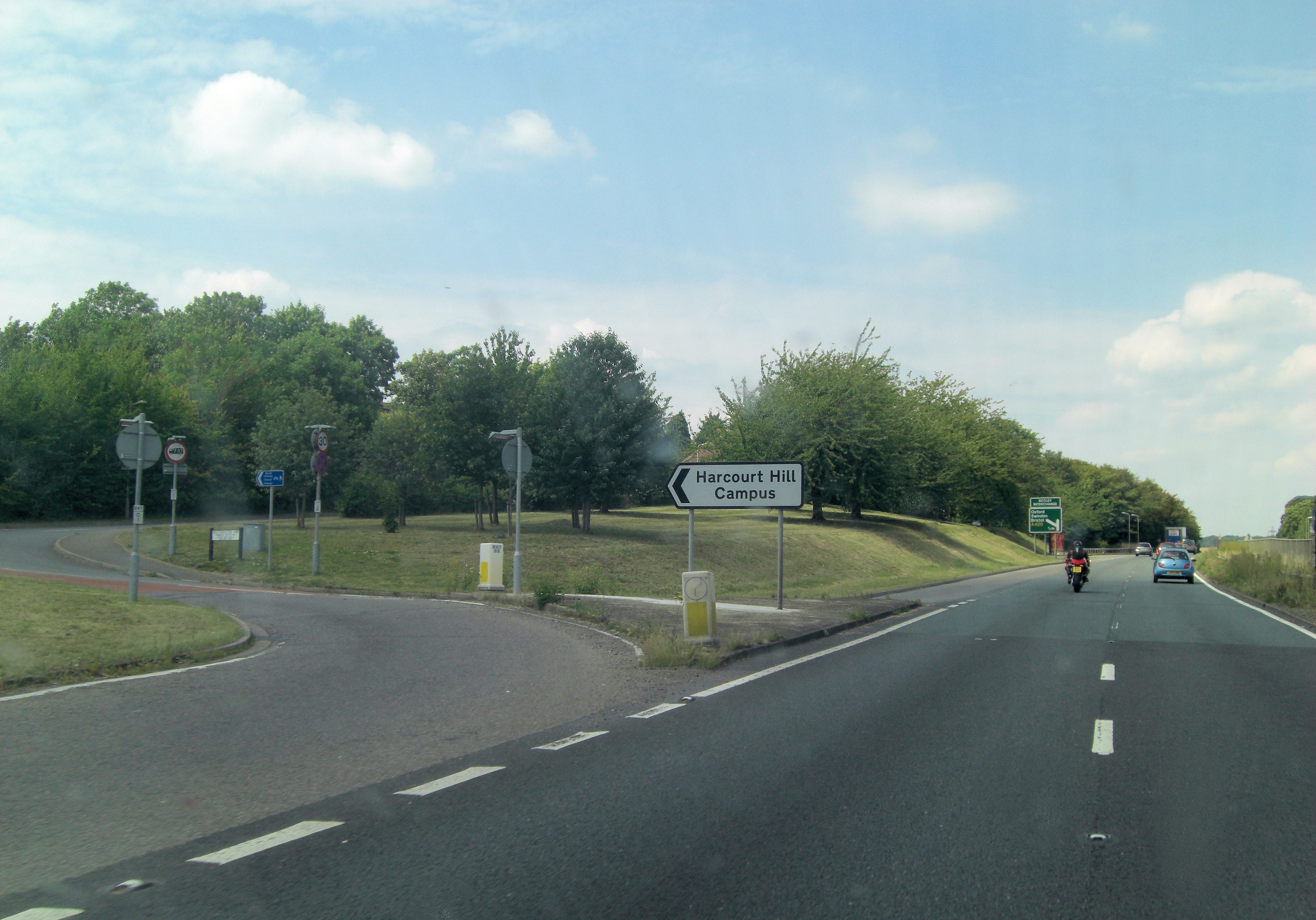
A34 access to Harcourt Hill

Harcourt Hill is a hill and community in North Hinksey in Oxfordshire, England, west of the city of Oxford. There is a good view of the city from the hill. It lies between Hinksey Hill to the southeast, Boars Hill to the south and Botley to the north. Until 1974 it was in Berkshire, but was transferred to Oxfordshire in that year.

== History ==
The Conduit House on the northeast side of Harcourt Hill was built in 1616–17 to supply water to the city of Oxford and was in use until 1869.

Harcourt Hill was part of an estate acquired by Earl Harcourt in 1772. The Harcourt family promoted various plans for developing the hill in the 19th century, and about 50 houses were eventually built there between the 1920s and the early 1960s.

In 1959, Westminster College moved from London to a new site on the northwest side of Harcourt Hill, which is now a campus of Oxford Brookes University.

Land on the south side of Harcourt Hill is now a green space owned and managed by the Oxford Preservation Trust. It was purchased by the OPT in 2016, with funding provided by local residents, to protect the land from development and preserve the views of Oxford from the site.

== Notable people ==
Well-known residents of Harcourt Hill have included Professor Sir Walter Raleigh, Sir Muirhead Bone and Martin Gilbert.
