= Oxford Ring Road =

Ring road around the city of Oxford, England

Coordinates: 51.7844°N 1.2505°W

The Oxford Ring Road circles the city of Oxford, England. It is a dual carriageway ring road for most of its length apart from a short section between Woodstock Road and Banbury Road in the north of the city. The severe restrictions on traffic in Oxford city centre mean that it is the only practical way for long-distance traffic to get past Oxford, especially as there are few road bridges over the rivers Isis and Cherwell. Five Park and Rides are close to the ring road.

== Junctions list ==
Oxford Ring Road
exits
Woodstock Road
A34 North, A44
A40
A4144 (Woodstock Road South), A40 West
A4165 (Banbury Road)
B4150 (Marsh Lane), Marston
A4142
A40 East, A420, Headington, (Headington Roundabout)
Kiln Lane, Beaumont Road
Horspath Driftway
Horspath Road
B480 (Garsington Road)
Sandy Lane West (Clockwise Access Only)
A4158 (Littlemore Roundabout)
A4074, Superstore
A423
A4144 (Kennington Roundabout)
Kennington Road (Clockwise Access Only)
Abingdon Road (Anti-Clockwise Access Only)
A34
A34 South, Hinksey Hill
South Hinksey
Westminster Way (Clockwise Access Only), North Hinksey Lane (Anti-Clockwise Access Only)
Stanley Close (Anti-Clockwise Access Only)
A420, (Botley Interchange)
Unnumbered Road to Wytham (Clockwise Access Only)

== Description ==
- The western section (about 6 miles (10 km); "Southern and Western By-pass roads") is part of the A34.
- To the north, the connection to complete the ring (under 1 mile (1.6 km) in total) includes a short section of the A40 ("Sunderland Avenue"; this is the only part that is not a dual carriageway) and a short section of the A44 ("Woodstock Road").
- The north-eastern section (about 4 miles (6 km);"Elsfield Way; Northern By-pass Road; North Way") is part of the A40.
- The south-eastern section (about 4 miles (6 km); "Eastern By-pass Road") is the A4142.
- The southern section (about 1 mile (1.6 km); part of "Southern By-pass Road") is designated as the A423, something of an anomaly since the continuation of the A423 southwards was renumbered as the A4074, and the continuation northwards as far as Banbury as the A4260, when the M40 motorway was opened.

== History ==
The north-eastern section, from Headington to Banbury Road, is the oldest part of the Oxford Ring Road. It was built in the mid-1930s and is part of the A40.

In 1938 the southern part of the western section was opened from the bottom of Hinksey Hill to Botley. The road was known as the "road to nowhere" and little used at that time. In 1962 it was extended north by a new bridge over the River Thames to Wolvercote, and the whole western section then became part of the A34. It was dualled in 1973.

The south-eastern section between Headington and Rose Hill was opened in 1959. The southern section between Hinksey Hill and Heyford Hill, including the new Isis Bridge over the River Thames, was opened in 1965. The ring road was completed when the short section between Rose Hill and Heyford Hill was opened in 1966.

The ring road has suffered major problems in recent years as housing developments are built next to the ring road leading to more traffic light intersections and roadworks. The latest traffic intersection on the Barton Park development, which opened in 2017, brings the total number of traffic light intersections on the ring road to 22.

== Future ==
In 2023, Oxfordshire County Council plans to rebuild the Kennington Bridge due to degradation of the bridge deck bearings, which due to the bridge design, cannot easily be replaced. The rebuilding process involves several utility diversions and also building over a major railway line and two Thames tributaries
