= Hinksey Hill =

Hill in Oxfordshire, England

Coordinates: 51.725°N 1.265°W

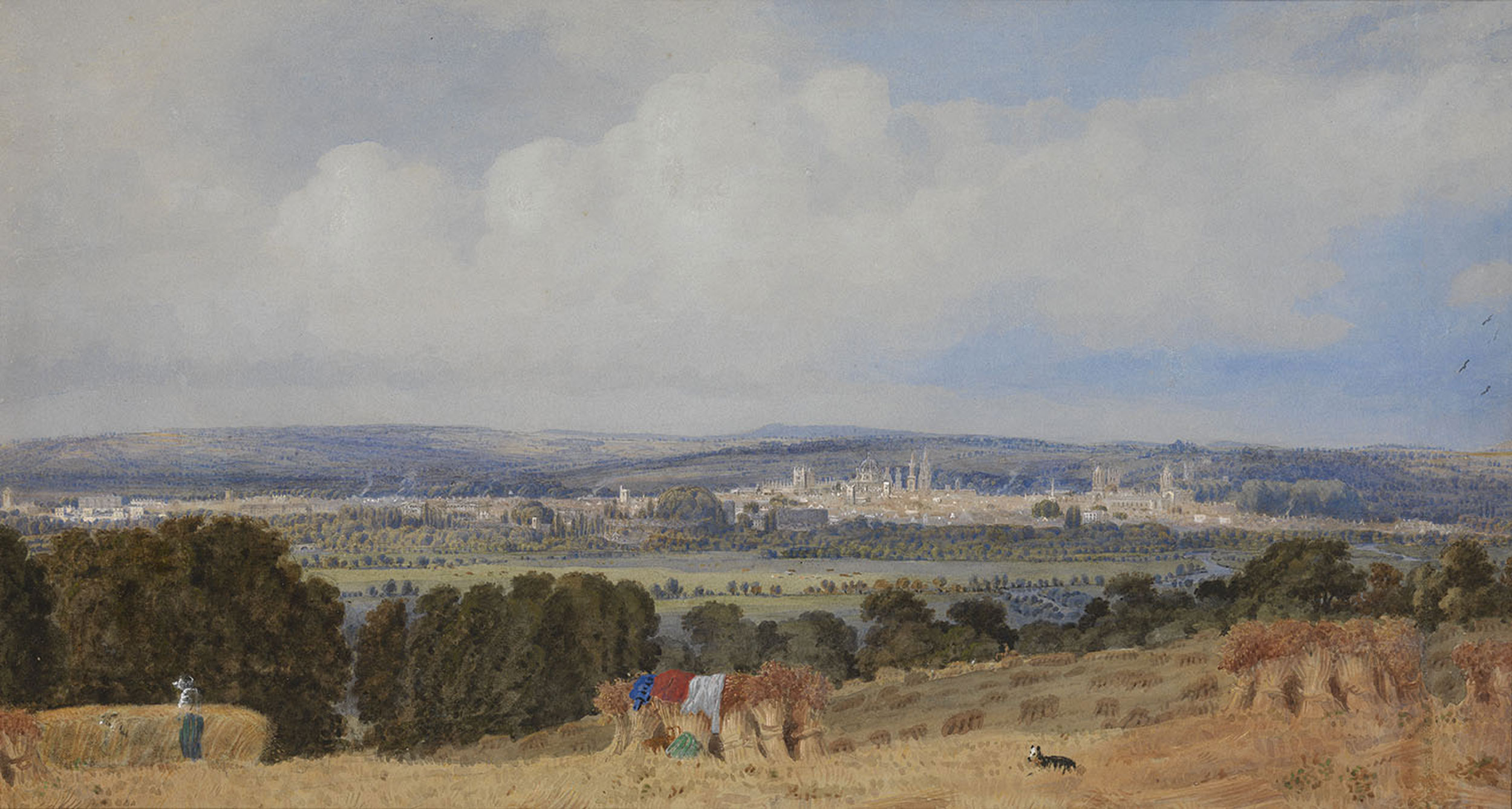
- Oxford from Hinksey Hill by William Turner, c.1840

- Location within Oxfordshire
- OS grid reference: SP5004
- Civil parish: South Hinksey
- District: South Oxfordshire
- Shire county: Oxfordshire
- Region: South East
- Country: England
- Sovereign state: United Kingdom
- Post town: Oxford
- Postcode district: OX1
- Dialling code: 01865
- Police: Thames Valley
- Fire: Oxfordshire
- Ambulance: South Central
- UK Parliament: Oxford West and Abingdon

Hinksey Hill is a hill and residential area 2 miles (3.2 km) south of the centre of Oxford, England. It is in South Hinksey civil parish, about 0.5 miles (800 m) south of the village. Hinksey Hill was part of Berkshire until the 1974 boundary changes transferred it to Oxfordshire.

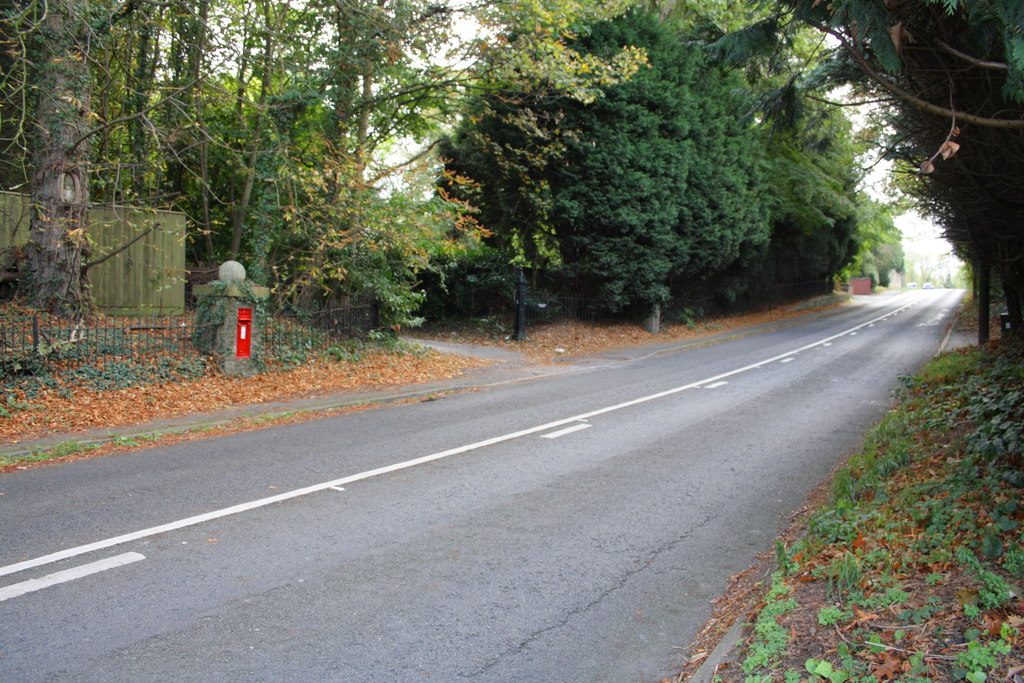
Hinksey Hill road up the hill

At the foot of the hill is Hinksey Hill Interchange, where the Abingdon By-Pass joins the Southern By-Pass Road. The road up the hill (also known as "Hinksey Hill") was the route of the A34 until the 1970s, when the Abingdon Bypass was completed. It is now an unclassified road.

Grandpont (literally "great bridge") was a causeway supported by more than 40 arches, running from Folly Bridge over the River Thames to the foot of Hinksey Hill. It was built by Robert D'Oilly in the late 11th century.

The summit of Hinksey Hill gives views of the city of Oxford, painted many times by the artist William Turner of Oxford (1789–1862). His Oxford from Hinksey Hill sold for £18,900 at Christie's in 2022. The painting is in the Oxford Town Hall. The nearby Boars Hill also gives views over Oxford.

Much of the land on Hinksey Hill was owned by the Earls of Abingdon until it was sold by the Montagu Bertie, 7th Earl of Abingdon (1836–1928) in acre-sized plots throughout the 1910s.

== See also ==
- Boars Hill
- Harcourt Hill
- Hinksey
