= Robert of Reading =

Robert of Reading or Robert de Reddinge was an English preaching friar, of the Dominican order; converted to Judaism about 1275. He appears to have studied Hebrew and by that means to have become interested in Judaism. He married a Jew, and was circumcised, taking the name of Hagin. Edward I, when he heard of this, brought the case before the Archbishop of Canterbury. It is said that this was one of the causes which led the king and his mother, Eleanor, to aim at the expulsion of the Jews from England.

== Memorial ==
In 1931, a plaque dedicated to Robert of Reading was placed on a remaining wall of Osney Abbey at Osney Mill Marina. It was unveiled by Charles Seligman. The plaque reads:

Near this stone in Osney Abbey, Robert of Reading, otherwise Haggai of Oxford, suffered for his faith on Sunday 17 April 1222 A.D. corresponding to 4 IYYAR 4982 A.N.
