= Mill Street, Oxford =

Street in Oxford, England

Coordinates: 51.7495°N 1.2703°W

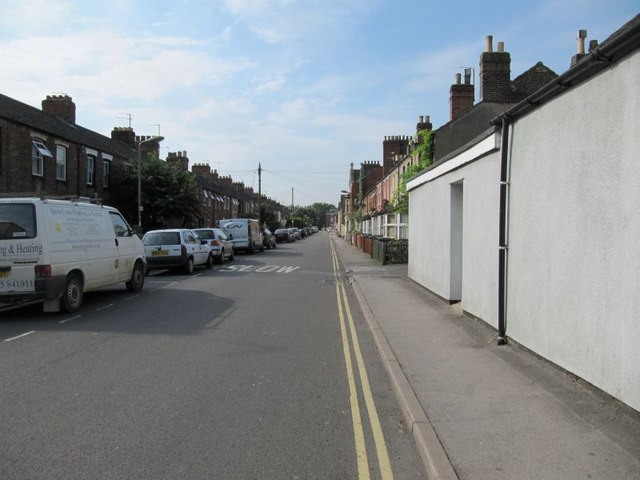
View along Mill Street

Mill Street is a street in Oxford, England. It is a cul-de-sac that runs south from the Botley Road close to Oxford railway station. It includes residential houses, mainly terraced, and some office space. Mill Street was built in the 1860s as part of the development of New Osney on what was then known as Osney Island.

== Overview ==
At its southern end was Osney Mill (a disused flour mill on the River Thames), after which the street is named. The mill stood on the site of the now-destroyed Osney Abbey. Little is left of the abbey today, but there is still a rubble and timber-framed structure at the mill site, which may date from the 15th century, on private land but visible from the street. The remnants were Grade II listed in 1954. In 2004, plans for a new development of homes on the mill site were given planning approval by Oxford City Council. Between 2012 and 2014 the area around the mill was finally redeveloped.

Close to the site of the former mill is Osney Lock, and to the south is Osney Mill Marina. To the east is Osney Cemetery, established in 1848 but now disused, between Mill Street and the railway tracks. Osney Lane leads from Mill Street over a footbridge across the railway tracks towards Oxpens Road and central Oxford to the north of the cemetery.

== Explosion ==
On 14 February 2017, a large explosion heard across much of Oxford occurred at the southern end of Mill Street, in a three-storey block of flats at the junction with Gibbs Crescent, completely destroying the building. The end of Mill Street was cordoned off by police and local residents were evacuated from their homes. Local residents were left in a state of limbo after the explosion, being unable to return to their homes.

== Gallery ==
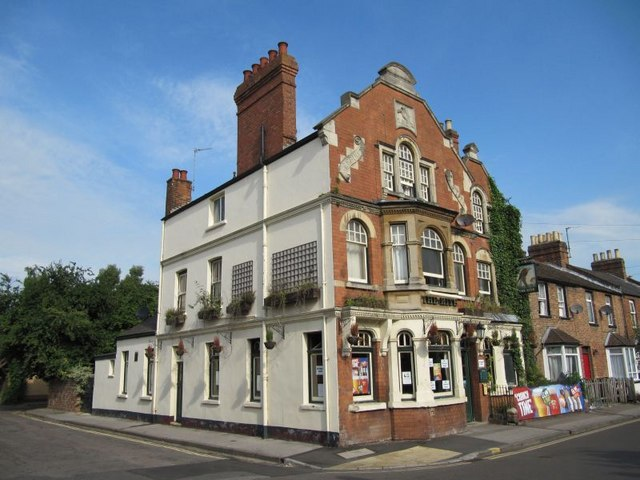
The Kite public house at 68–69 Mill Street.

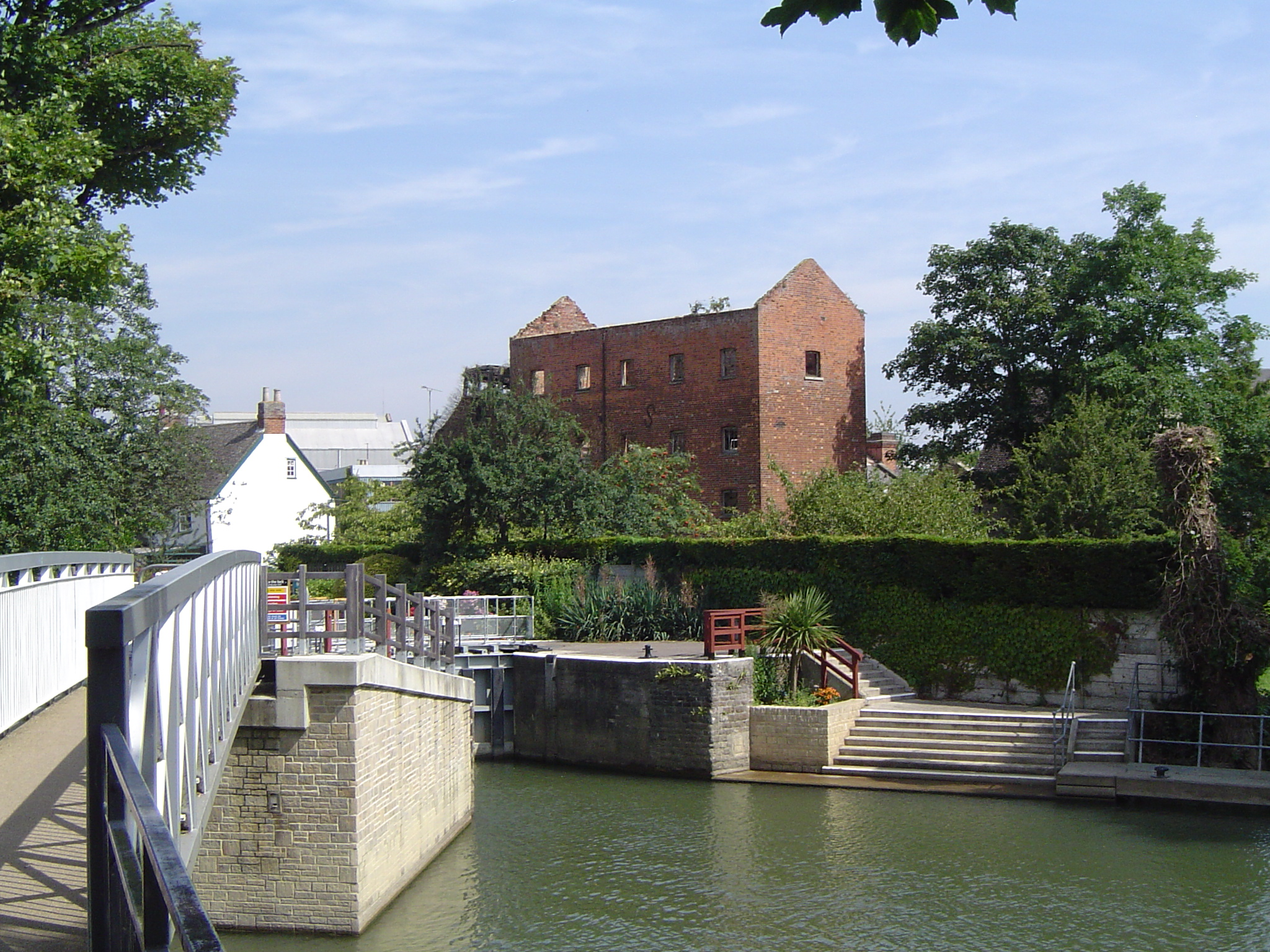
The derelict Osney Mill buildings off Mill Street to the west, with Osney Lock in the foreground.

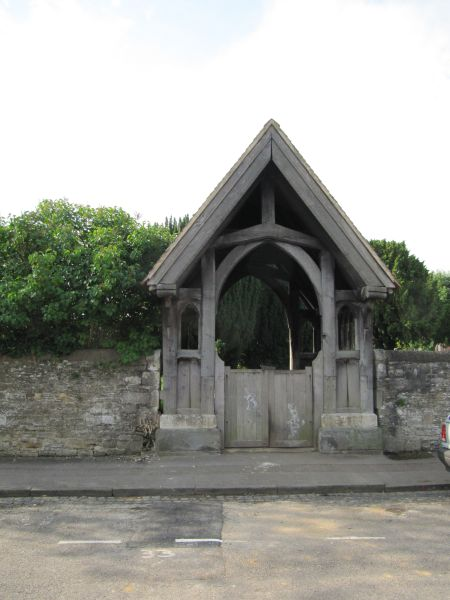
The lychgate entrance to Osney Cemetery off Mill Street to the east.

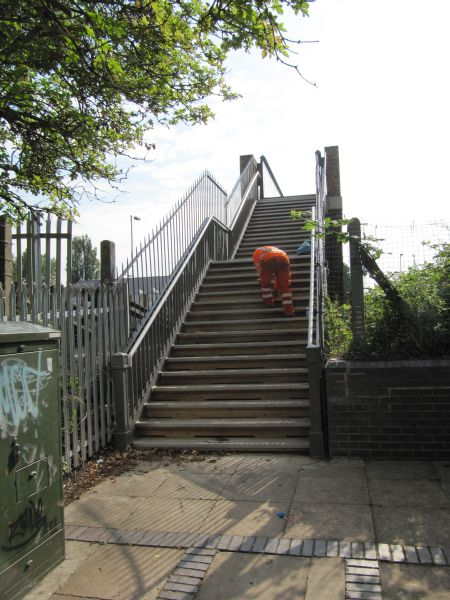
The footbridge over the railway that connects Mill Street with Beckett Street, south of Oxford railway station.
