= Synod of Oxford =

Synod held on 9 May 1222

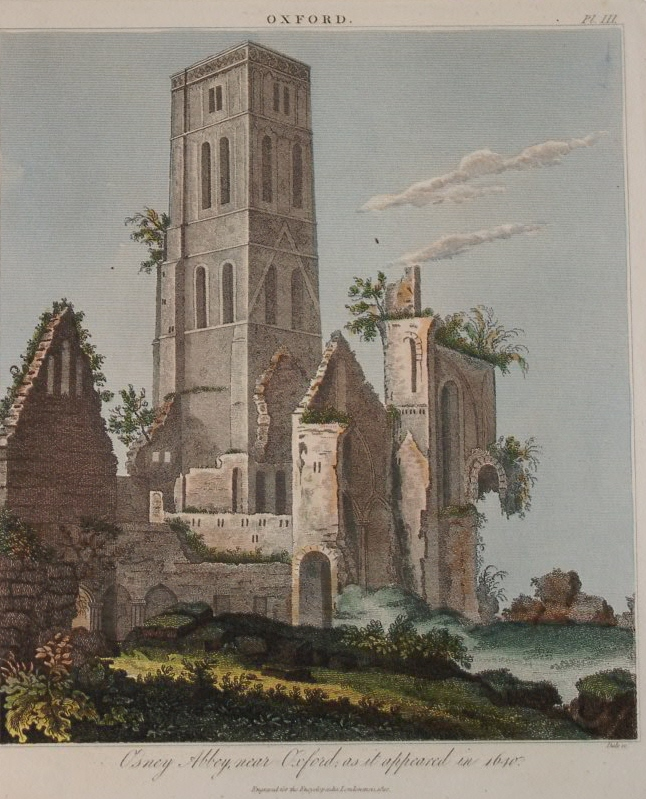
1640 engraving of Osney Abbey ruins, site of the Synod

The Synod of Oxford was held on 9 May 1222, at Osney Abbey, in Oxford, England. It was a council of the (Catholic) church in England, convened by Archbishop Stephen Langton. It is notable for a number of the decisions taken and canon laws set.

During the Synod, "harsh anti-Jewish laws" were enacted: "social relations between Jews and Christians were blocked; church tithes were levied against Jews, and English Jews were forced to wear an identifying badge. The construction of new synagogues was also prevented."

For many centuries, it was thought that the decision that Saint George's Day should be celebrated as a holy day in England was made at this Synod. However, since the 1960s, this has been regarded by historians as an invention.

== The Synod ==
Langton's ambition was to reform the English church, especially with regard to monastic law. The Synod also established celebration of the Feast of the Circumcision of Christ on 1 January, building on long-established celebrations of the start of the Julian calendar year.

The Synod also followed and implemented the anti-Jewish decrees laid out by the Fourth Lateran Council of 1215.

== Saint George's Day ==
For many centuries, it was thought that the Synod set the celebration of 23 April as Saint George's Day on a par with other Christian feast days, although it stopped short of declaring St George the patron saint of England, which did not happen until 1347. However, in 1961, historian C. R. Cheney published research in the Bulletin of Historical Research, followed by further published research in 1964, that "conclusively refuted ... [this] misapprehension", based on showing that the earliest surviving manuscripts of the synod's declaration do not mention the feast of St. George. Nonetheless, modern sources sometimes still continue to assert the connection.

== Legacy ==
According to the Diocese of Oxford, these "prejudicial" laws passed at Oxford in 1222 were the precursor to further anti-Jewish statutes, in particular those passed in 1253 and 1275. This increasing intolerance culminated in the expulsion of the Jews from England in 1290.

== 2022 anniversary ==
In May 2022, to mark the 800th anniversary of the Synod, a service was held at Christ Church Cathedral, Oxford. There, representatives of Christians and Jews met. Although the Church of England as currently constituted dates to the 16th-century English Reformation, it claims continuity with the pre-Reformation English church, and Anglican leaders have insisted on the importance of an apology. Archbishop Justin Welby said on Twitter that "it was an opportunity to 'remember, repent and rebuild'."
