= Licoricia of Winchester =

Jewish-English moneylender

- Died: 1277; Winchester, England
- Spouses: Abraham of Kent; David of Oxford (m. 1242; died 1244)
- Children: Benedict; Hugo Michal; Lumbard; Belia; Lena Athenais

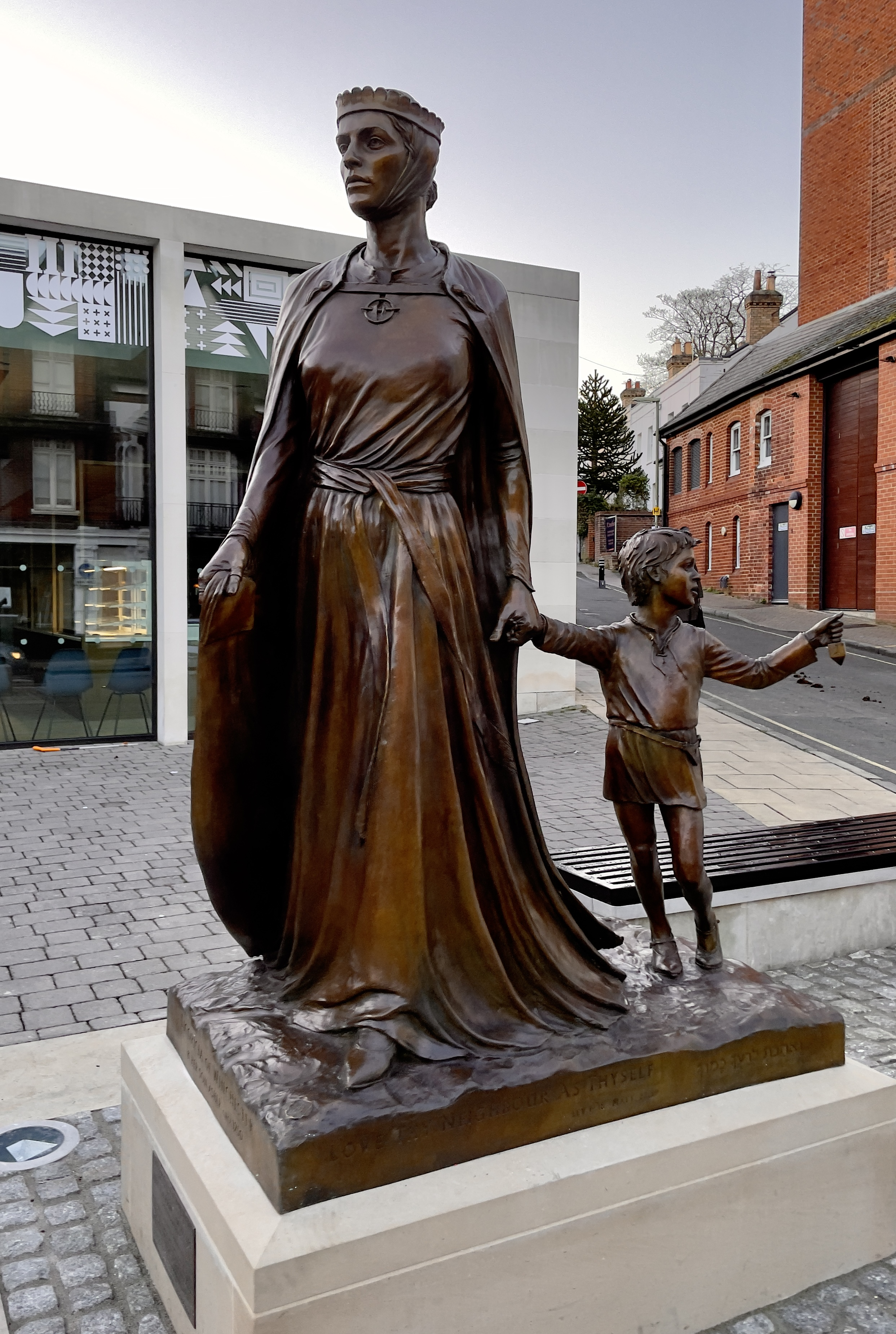
A statue of Licoricia was unveiled in 2022. The statue is on Jewry Street in Winchester.

Licoricia of Winchester (early 13th century – 1277) was an English Jewish businesswoman.

== Life ==
The birth date of Licoricia is unknown, but she was most likely born in the early 13th century. Her name means "sweet meat." Licoricia's name reflects a fashion in early 13th-century England for exotic names among Christian and Jewish women, though Licoricia appears not to have been such a popular choice. This partly explains why her life and career show up more clearly in the record.

Licoricia first appears in records in 1234 as a young widow with three sons, Cockerel, Benedict, and Lumbard, and a daughter, Belia. Her financing activities are documented from the early 1230s, when she lent money in association with other Jews, as well as by herself with an attorney. In 1242, she married her second husband, David of Oxford, who was known as the richest Jew in England. He wanted to marry her so much that he divorced his wife Muriel, and Henry III prevented the English Beth Din putting obstacles before his remarriage. They had a son, Asher, nicknamed Sweteman, born in 1243.

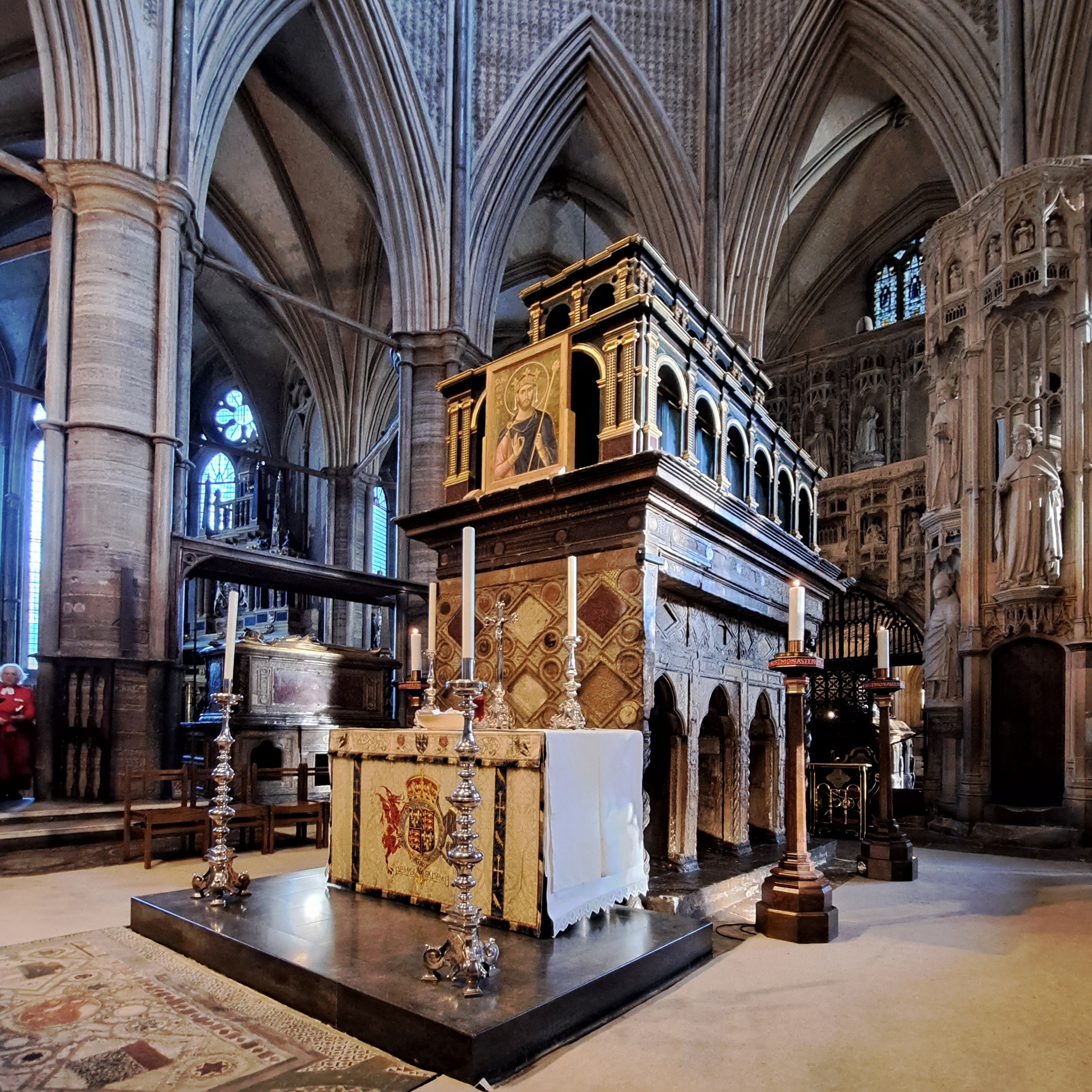
Shrine to Edward the Confessor, Westminster Abbey

Licoricia was detained by the King at the Tower of London for surety for the King's portion of David's estate upon her husband's death in 1244. This portion totalled 5,000 marks. From this, 4,000 marks were used to fund the rebuilding of Westminster Abbey and the shrine to Edward the Confessor. Rebecca Abrams writes in Licoricia of Winchester: Power and Prejudice in Medieval England that the price Licoricia paid for repurchasing her husband David of Oxford’s estate after his death was 5,000 marks (a mark was 2/3 of a pound): "Of this, 4,000 marks was earmarked for the building of a chapel at Westminster Abbey to house a lavish shrine to Edward the Confessor (1003–1066), whom Henry III had made his patron saint. Licoricia was also ordered to pay an additional sum of £2,500 as a personal contribution to the new chapel." Of this shrine, only the base now exists.

Upon her release in September 1244, Licoricia returned to live with her family in Winchester, where she continued David's business and began further enterprises of her own. Over the next 30 years, Licoricia became a businesswoman, financing people across Southern England. Her clients included King Henry III and his wife Queen Eleanor of Provence and notable nobles, including Simon de Montfort, 6th Earl of Leicester prior to his rebellion in the Second Barons' War (1264–1267).

The Second Barons' War, with attacks on Jews and destruction of their business documents, probably impoverished her. Her sons, Asher and Lumbard, and her grandchildren, are likely to have been forced out of England in 1290, along with the rest of the Jewish community. Her son Benedict became the only Jewish guildsman in medieval England and probably anywhere else in Western Europe. This enabled him to own tenements and houses, and be a citizen, both of which were impossible for the rest of the Jewish community. Her son by David of Oxford, Asher (sometimes spelled Asser), was imprisoned in Winchester Castle in 1287, whilst the King was attempting to impose a large taxation on the Jews (the 13th century witnessed immense taxation on the Jews under John and under Henry III from the 1240s), and left graffiti there, which stated in Hebrew, "On Friday, eve of the Sabbath in which the portion Emor is read, all the Jews of the land of the isle were imprisoned. I, Asher, inscribed this". Little evidence exists for her other children.

Licoricia was murdered in her house on Jewry Street alongside her Christian servant, Alice of Bickton, in early 1277. They were found by Licoricia's daughter Belia. Three men were indicted for the murders, but none was convicted, and the murder was never solved. According to Licoricia's biographer, Rebecca Abrams, "She was Jewish, she was rich, she was a woman: All three might have led to her death. It could have been score settling. She was litigious and pursued debts. She was very feisty and succeeded against the odds." The murder could have also been a hate crime.

Edward I introduced the Statute of the Jewry in 1275, which prohibited Jews from usury. One of Licoricia's sons, Benedict, was hanged for coin clipping and her family banished from England with the Jewish community by the 1290 Edict of Expulsion.

== Legacy ==
Licoricia has been described by historian Robert Stacey as "the most important Jewish woman in medieval England".

Planning permission for a statue on Jewry Street in Winchester, commemorating Licoricia of Winchester and her son Asher, by the sculptor Ian Rank-Broadley, was granted in August 2018. Funds were raised for this project by the Licoricia of Winchester Appeal, to lead people to the history of the medieval Jewish community and their royal connections, as well as to promote tolerance and diversity today, to inspire women and young people, and to beautify Winchester. The unveiling, on 10 February 2022, was to have been performed by Charles, Prince of Wales, but he was isolating after he tested positive for COVID-19. He visited the statue on 3 March 2022. The statue is opposite where Licoricia's house and the city's 13th-century synagogue once stood, outside the Arc (formerly the Winchester Discovery Centre) in Jewry Street. Asher is holding a dreidel (a spinning top), and on the statue's plinth is a quotation from the Book of Leviticus; "Love thy neighbour as thyself" in English and Hebrew.

An illustrated book, commissioned by the Licoricia of Winchester Appeal, entitled Licoricia of Winchester: Power and Prejudice in Medieval England, was written by Rebecca Abrams and published on 9 June 2022. In September 2026 Tracy Ann Oberman starred as Licoricia in a video

== See also ==
- Belia of Winchester
- History of the Jews in England (1066–1290)
