= Osney Mill =

Former flour mill in Oxford, England

Coordinates: 51.7494°N 1.27167°W

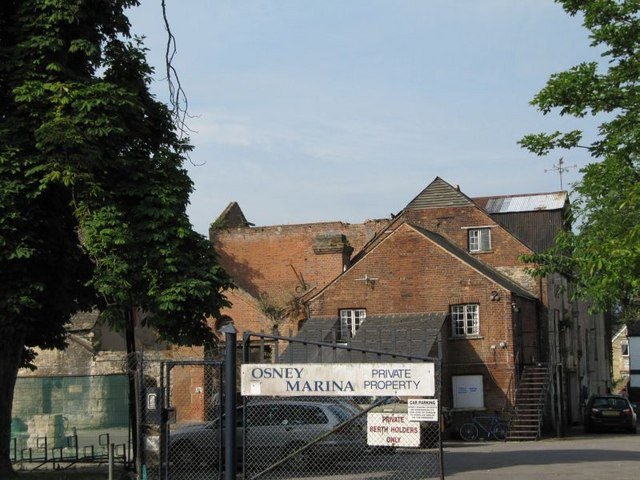
The derelict Osney Mill at the southern end of Mill Street, Oxford, with the entrance to the Osney Marina in the foreground.

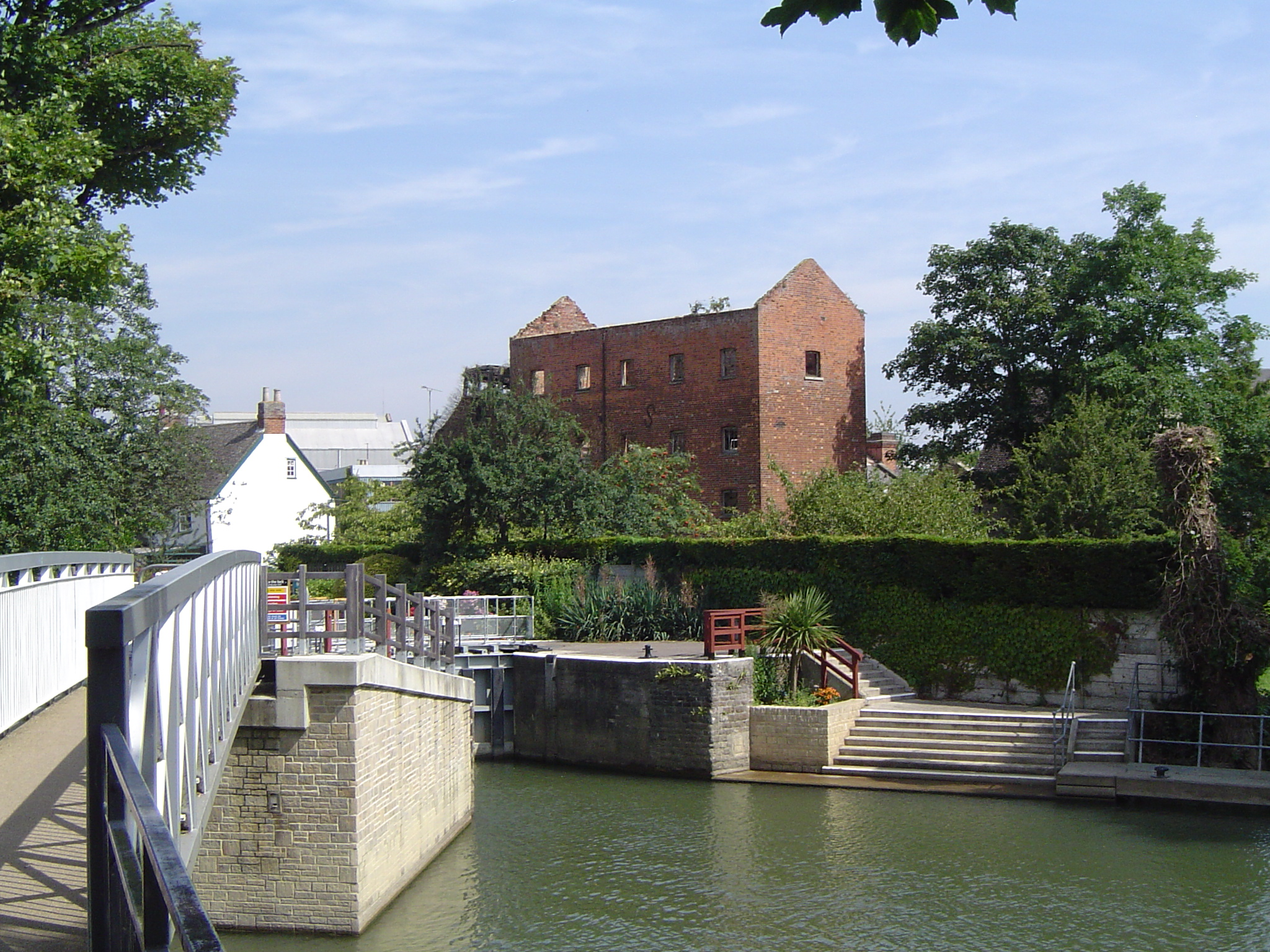
The exterior of the building with Osney Lock in the foreground, taken prior to its incorporation into a new housing development.

Osney Mill is a former flour mill on a branch of the River Thames in Oxford, England, located south of the Botley Road, down Mill Street. While the mill was gutted by a fire in 1945 and remained derelict for over 60 years, the exterior walls were incorporated into a modern apartment building during the early-2010s that now occupies the site.

Close by the site of the mill is Osney Lock. To the east is Osney Cemetery, to the west is Osney Island, while Oxford railway station lies just to the north.

== History ==
The mill is on the site of the now-destroyed Osney Abbey. Little is left of the abbey, but there is still a rubble and timber-framed structure at the mill site, which may date from the 15th century. The remnants were Grade II listed in 1954.

In 1895, William Henry Munsey came to Oxford after his farming business in Cambridgeshire was affected by foot and mouth disease. Initially, he worked for Pratt & Haines as a forage manager. In 1898, he went into partnership with Archer Cowley and took over Osney Mill. The partnership did not last and the business became W.H. Munsey Ltd in 1911. The mill produced flour for bread but was destroyed by fire in 1945. It was decided not to rebuild Osney Mill and the business moved to Wantage, south of Oxford, although the family still owns the site.

In 2004, there were plans for a new development of homes, after planning approval by Oxford City Council. An Oxford building contractor, Knowles & Son, was contracted to turn the derelict mill building into flats. Work started on renovation in January 2011 and has now been completed.
