= Belia of Winchester =

13th century English businesswoman

Belia of Winchester (d. after 1273) was an English-Jewish businesswoman and moneylender.

Belia was married to Deulebene (d. 1235) and became active in business as a widow. Her mother-in-law Chera of Winchester (d. 1244) was also a prominent moneylender with business in Kent, Nottingham and Devon, and sometimes her business partner. Belia became an important member of the Winchester community.

In 1241 Belia became the only woman in medieval England elected to be responsible for the Winchester hostage, her brother-in-law Elias, who was answerable for collecting the community's tallage. She moved to Bedford after her second marriage to Pictavin of Bedford and established her business there.

She is one of the more documented of many prominent female moneylenders in medieval England, alongside Licoricia of Winchester, Avigay of London; Belassez of Oxford; Comitissa of Cambridge; Floria, widow of Bonevie of Newbury; Floria, widow of Master Elias; Henne, widow of Aaron of York; Henne, widow of Jacob of Oxford; Milka of Canterbury and her daughter, Mirabel of Gloucester.
