= Osney Mill Marina =

Marina in Oxford, England

Coordinates: 51.74819°N 1.26952°W

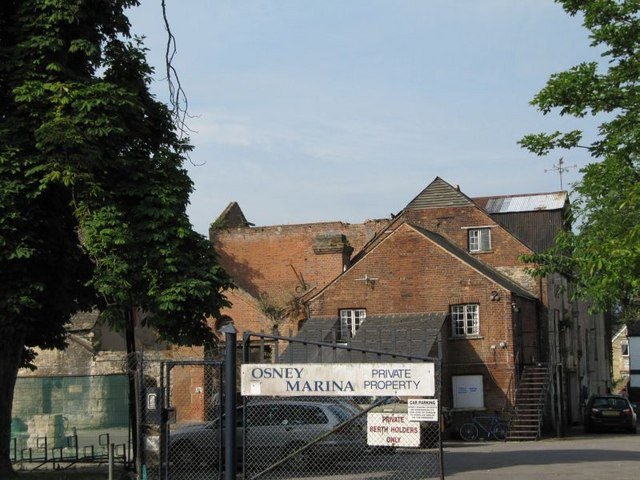
Entrance to the marina at the southern end of Mill Street, Oxford, with the derelict Osney Mill in the background.

Osney Mill Marina, also known as Osney Marina, is a private marina on a branch off the River Thames in Oxford, England. It is located south from the Botley Road down Mill Street and close to the site of Osney Abbey and Oxford railway station to the north.

The marina is located on a 500m long island created in the Middle Ages to provide water for Osney Mill to the north, now disused. Access to the Thames is at the southern end of the marina.

To the northeast is Osney Cemetery. Also to the north is Osney Lock.
