= Osney Lock Hydro =

Hydroelectric power station in Oxford, England

- Country: England
- Location: Oxford, Oxfordshire
- Coordinates: 51.7496°N 1.2727°W
- Status: Operational
- Commission date: May 2015
- Owner: Osney Lock Hydro
- Operator: Osney Lock Hydro

Power generation
- Nameplate capacity: 49 kW

External links
- Website: http://www.osneylockhydro.co.uk/
- Commons: Related media on Commons

Osney Lock Hydro is a micro hydroelectric scheme in Oxford, England. It is located on the River Thames, using the head of water provided by the weir at Osney Lock. It can generate 49 kilowatts (66 hp) of electricity with its archimedes screw turbine. Between 2015 and 2020 the scheme generated an average of 188 megawatt-hours (680 GJ) a year of electricity, which is enough to power around 60 homes.

The scheme is owned and operated by Osney Lock Hydro, an industrial and provident society for the benefit of the community. The idea for the project was first raised in 2002, with construction work starting in the summer of 2013, and the first electricity was generated in May 2015.

In May 2025, the scheme celebrated its tenth anniversary of generating electricity. Osney Lock Hydro is part of the Low Carbon Hub network of community energy groups, alongside West Oxford Community Renewables.
