= Robert King (bishop) =

First Bishop of Oxford

The Right Reverend Robert King
- Bishop of Oxford
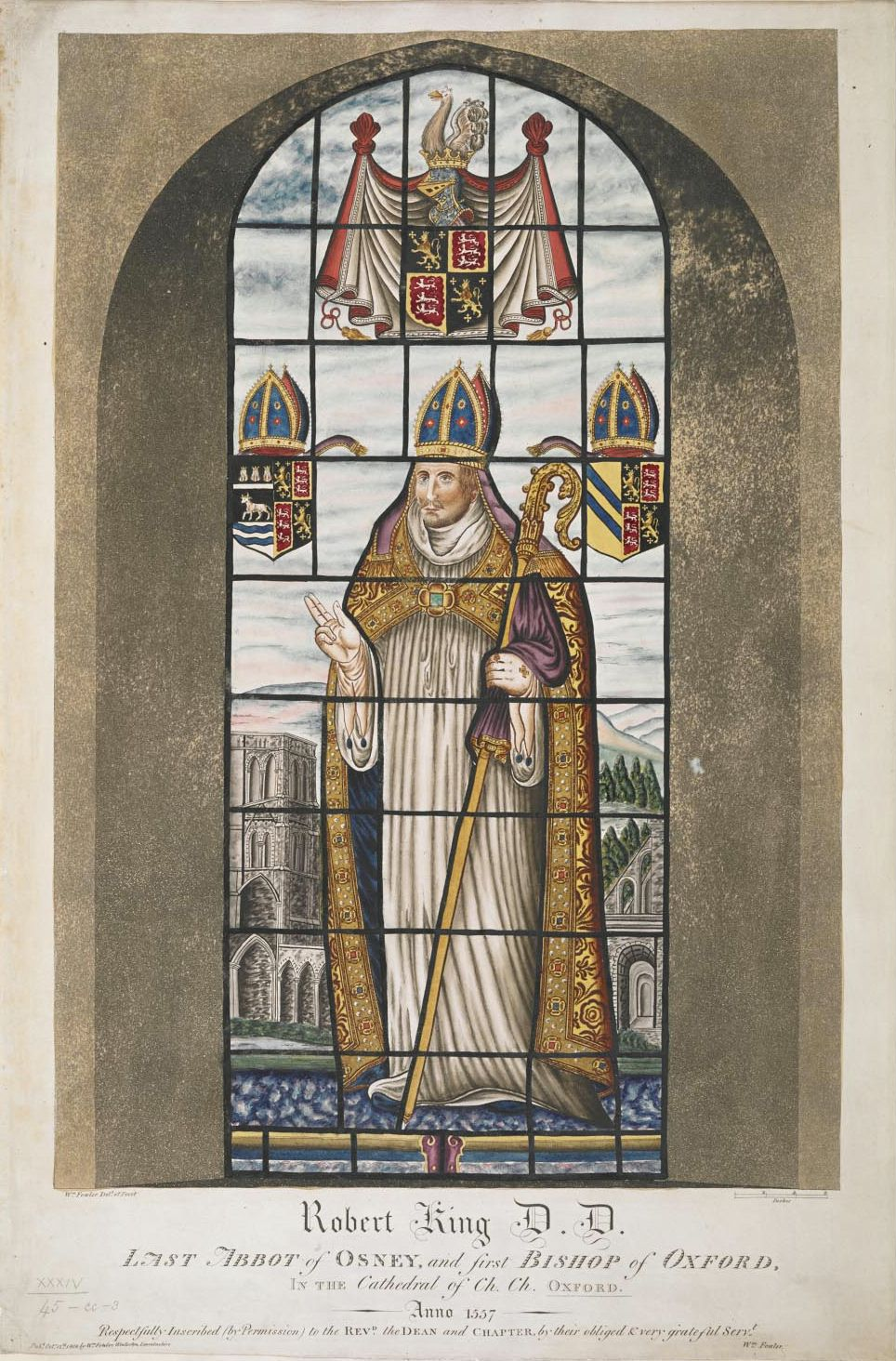
- Church: Church of England / Roman Catholic
- Installed: 1546
- Term ended: 1558
- Predecessor: Diocese established
- Successor: Thomas Goldwell

Personal details
- Died: c. 1558

Robert King (died 1558) was an English churchman who became the first Bishop of Oxford.

== Biography ==
Robert King was a Cistercian monk, of Thame Park Abbey, and the last Abbot there, a position he obtained perhaps through the influence of the Bishop of Lincoln, John Longland, as whose prebendary and suffragan bishop he had acted from 1535: he was appointed suffragan bishop in Lincoln on 7 January 1527, and ordained and consecrated to the titular See of Rheon, Greece (Reonesis) on 13 May. This was a move from the position of abbot at Bruerne Abbey. Previously he had been vicar at Charlbury.

King became abbot at Oseney Abbey in 1537. Both Thame Park and Oseney were dissolved in 1539, as part of the dissolution of the monasteries under Henry VIII. In 1541 King was made Bishop of Thame and Oseney. The next year his diocese was changed, into the Diocese of Oxford. In further changes the cathedral in Oxford was the previous St Frideswide's Priory, and became instead part of Christ Church, Oxford. King is commemorated there by a window made by Bernard van Linge.

The buildings of the old Gloucester College, Oxford, which had become in 1542 the bishop's palace, were under Edward VI taken back by the Crown. King lived in what is now called the Old Palace (rebuilt in the seventeenth century), and Littlemore Hall.

Under Mary I, he returned to Catholicism. He was a judge at the trial of Thomas Cranmer.
