= Osney Lock =

Lock on the River Thames in Oxfordshire, England

Coordinates: 51.74864°N 1.27135°W

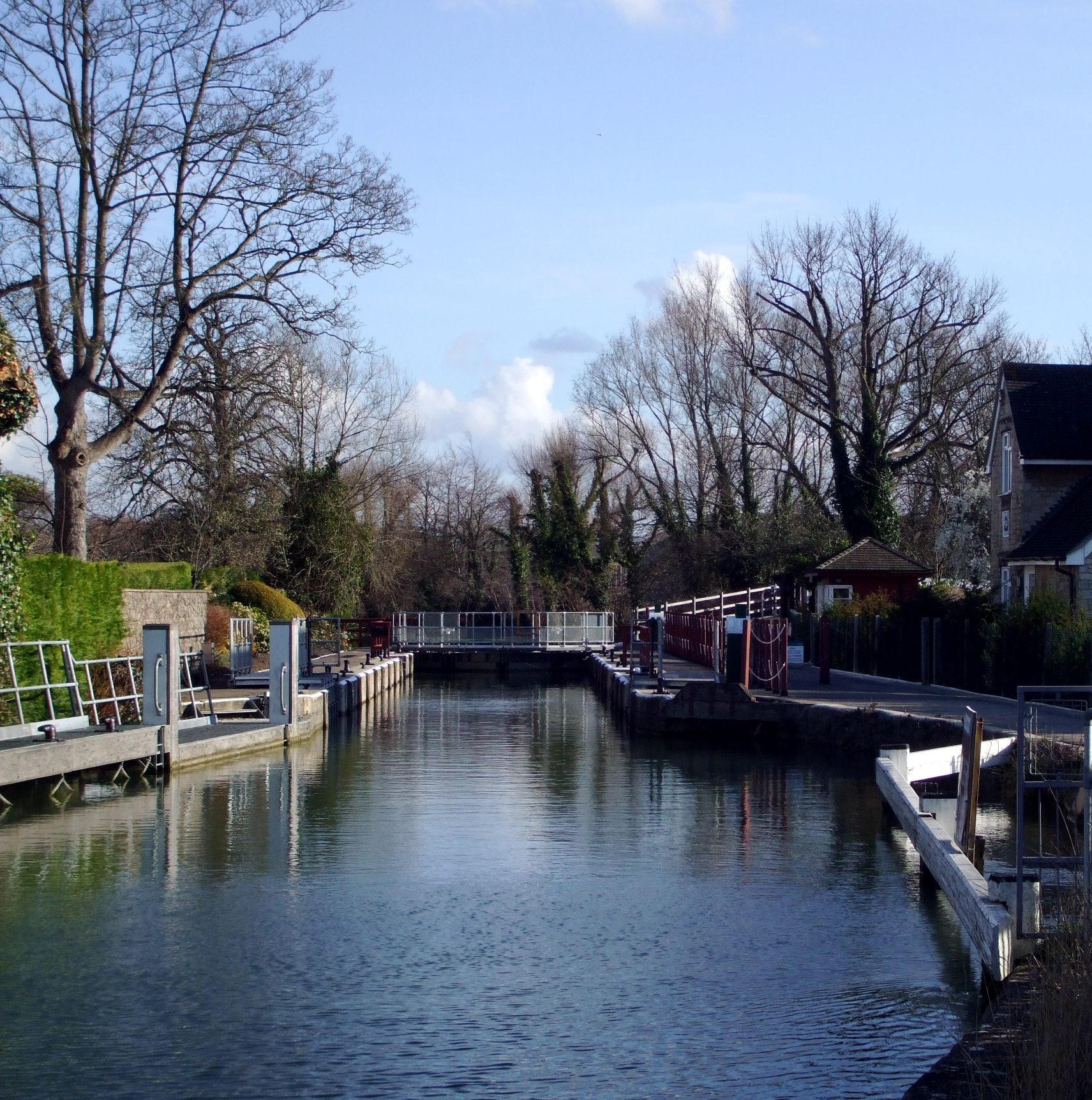
- Osney Lock, looking upstream from the north
- Waterway: River Thames
- County: Oxfordshire
- Maintained by: Environment Agency
- Operation: Hydraulic
- First built: 1790
- Latest built: 1905
- Length: 34.64 m (113 ft 8 in)
- Width: 5.25 m (17 ft 3 in)
- Fall: 1.89 m (6 ft 2 in)
- Above sea level: 185'
- Distance to Teddington Lock: 93 miles

Osney Lock is a lock on the River Thames in Oxford, England, where the village or island of Osney is next to the river.

The first lock was built of stone by Daniel Harris for the Thames Navigation Commission in 1790.

Across the weir pool is a large Environment Agency complex which monitors the River Thames, while a small office building exists on the front lawn opposite the lock house. The weir is upstream of the lock alongside the navigation channel in two parts and feeds the Osney pool. The Osney Lock Hydro hydro-electric plant occupies a building beside the weir.

To the south and southwest are Osney Mill Marina and Osney Cemetery. Oxford railway station on the Botley Road is close by to the northwest.

== History ==
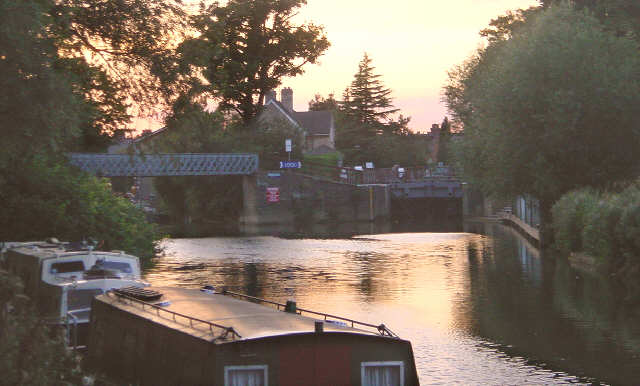
Osney Lock, circa 2003

The main navigation channel was formerly on the branch of the river known as Bulstake Stream further west. The present stream was developed in mediaeval times by the monks of Osney Abbey on the west side of the island then known as Osney, to serve as a millstream for Osney Mill, in a manner similar to that at Abingdon. There was an ancient weir, the property of the Abbey on the site, and a pound lock was first considered in 1787. The stream became the main navigation channel when the lock was built in 1790. Daniel Harris used prisoner labour from Oxford jail to give the cheapest quote for the work. The last rebuilding of the lock was in 1905.

== Access to the lock ==
The lock can be reached a short way down the towpath from Osney Bridge on the A420 Botley Road on the way west out of the centre of Oxford.

== Reach above the lock ==
The river passes a former electricity generating station and is crossed by Osney Bridge near Oxford railway station. On the eastern bank are built up parts of Oxford. After a stretch of allotments on the western bank and the backs of houses on the eastern bank there is the curious water crossroads - "Four Rivers". This provides a link to the Oxford Canal via the Sheepwash Channel in one direction and there is Bulstake Stream in the other direction. The river runs through willow banks until it reaches Fiddler's Island. There used to be a weir and flash lock here; now there is the rainbow shaped Medley Footbridge crossing the main channel. On the other side of the island is Castle Mill Stream, an old navigation channel that runs to the east closer to the centre of Oxford rejoining the Thames below the lock. On the eastern bank is the open ground of Port Meadow as far as Wolvercote.

There are navigation transit markers alongside Port Meadow upstream of Medley Boat station, to allow river users to check their speed. A powered boat should not pass between the markers in under one minute.

The Thames Path crosses to the Oxford side at Osney Bridge and then crosses Fiddler's Island and Medley Footbridge returning to the western bank to continue to Godstow Lock.

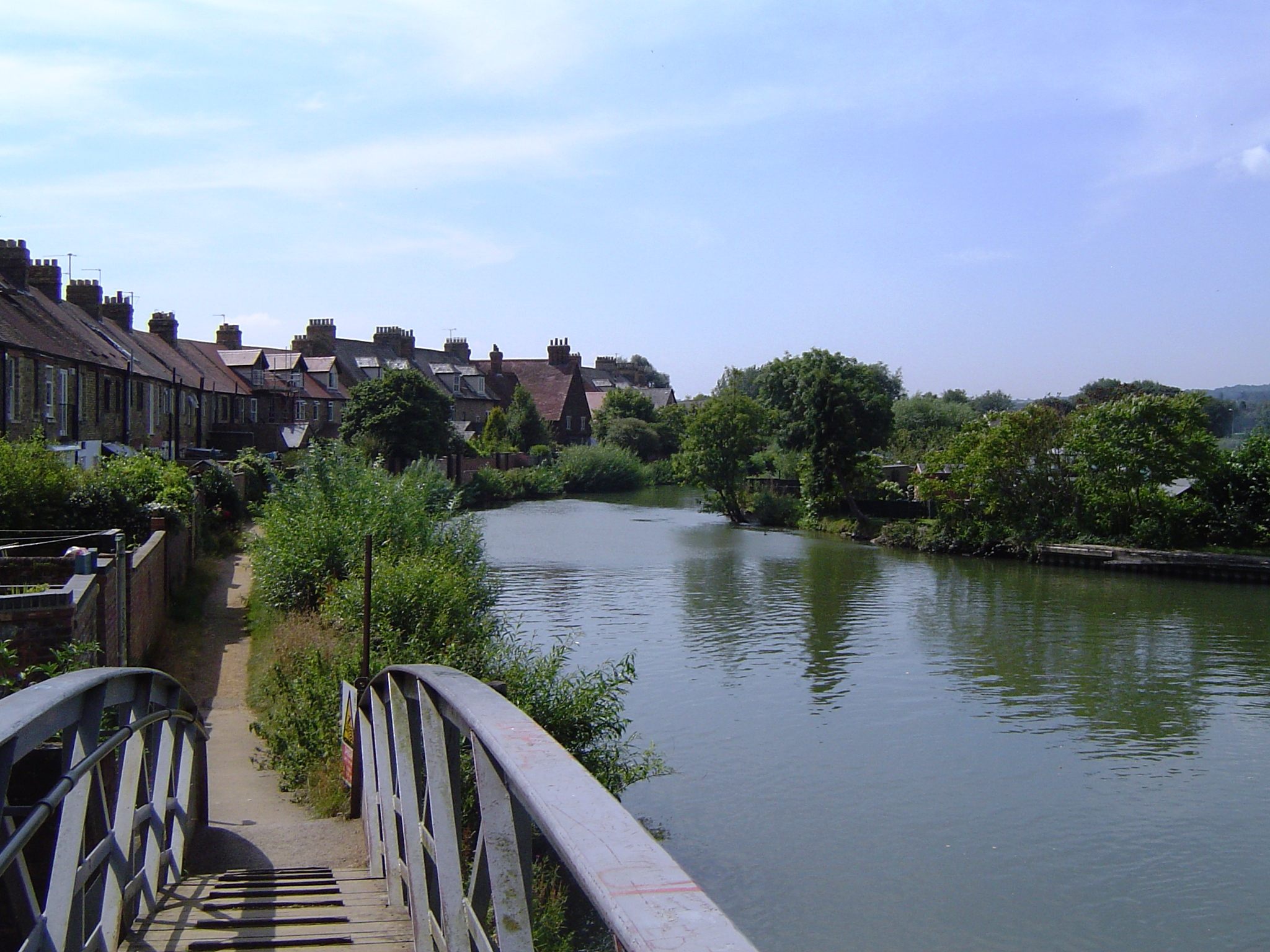
Oxford shows its back to the river below Four Rivers

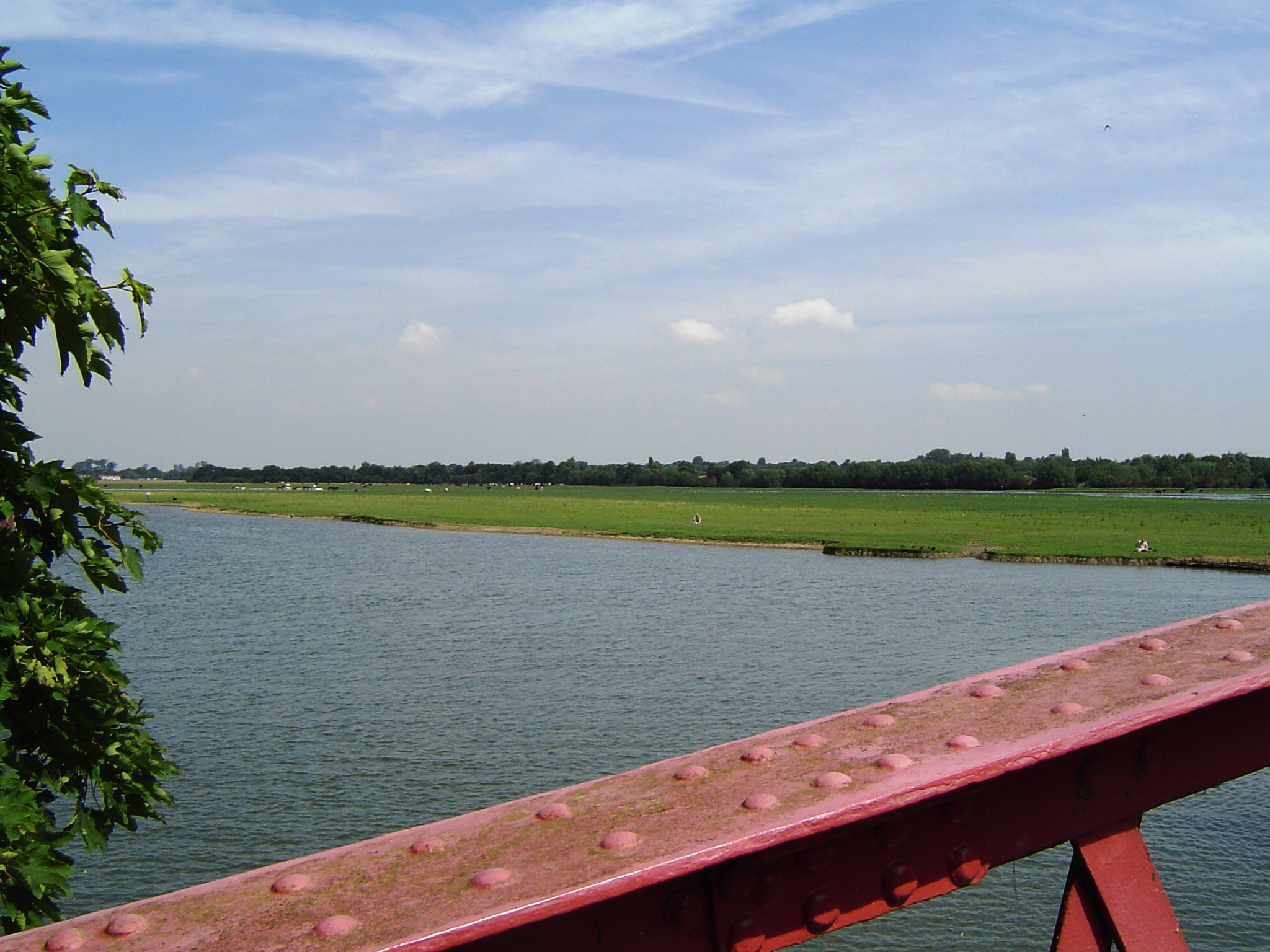
Port Meadow looking upstream from Medley Footbridge

== See also ==
- Locks on the River Thames

== Sources ==
- Davies, Mark; Robinson, Catherine (2003) [2001]. A Towpath Walk in Oxford. Oxford: Oxford Towpath Press. ISBN 0-9535593-1-9.
- Thacker, Fred. S. (1968) [1920]. The Thames Highway: Volume II Locks and Weirs. Newton Abbot: David and Charles.

Next lock upstream	River Thames	Next lock downstream
Godstow Lock; 3.87 km (2.40 mi)	Osney Lock; Grid reference: SP504058	Iffley Lock; 3.73 km (2.32 mi)
