= Osney Abbey =

Abbey in Oxford, England

Coordinates: 51°44′59″N 1°16′12″W

Osney Cathedral
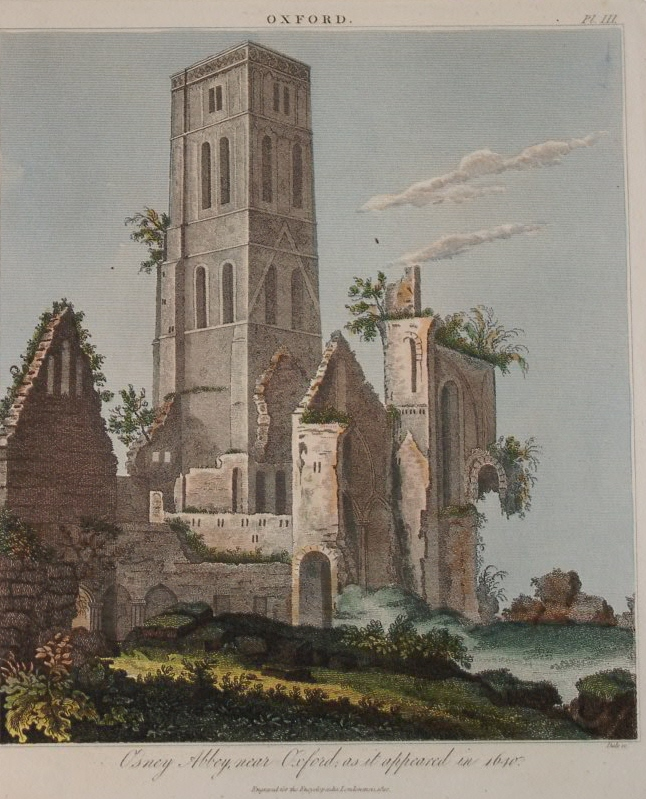
- Engraving of Osney Abbey in 1640
- Osney Cathedral
- Denomination: Church of England
- Previous denomination: Roman Catholic

History
- Founded: x1541–1545
- Dedication: St George

Administration
- Diocese: Diocese of Oxford

Clergy
- Bishop: Robert King (1542–1545)
- Dean: John London (1542–1543); Richard Cox (1543–1545)

Osney Abbey or Oseney Abbey, later Osney Cathedral, was a house of Augustinian canons at Osney in Oxfordshire. The site is south of the modern Botley Road, down Mill Street by Osney Cemetery, next to the railway line just south of Oxford station. It was founded as a priory in 1129, becoming an abbey around 1154. It was dissolved in 1539 but was created a cathedral, the last abbot Robert King becoming the first Bishop of Oxford. The see was transferred to the new foundation of Christ Church in 1545 and the building fell into ruin. It was one of the four renowned monastic houses of medieval Oxford, along with St Frideswide's Priory, Rewley and Godstow.

== History ==
The house was founded by Robert D'Oyly the younger, Norman governor of Oxford, prompted by his wife, Edith Forne, who, to expiate the sins of her former life as the mistress of Henry I, solicited her husband to this pious work with a story of the chattering of magpies, interpreted by a chaplain as souls in purgatory who needed the foundation of a monastery to expiate their sins.

Edith was buried in Osney Abbey, in a religious habit, as John Leland describes upon seeing her tomb as it was on the eve of the dissolution: ‘Ther lyeth an image of Edith, of stone, in th' abbite of a vowess, holding a hart in her right hand, on the north side of the high altaire’. The legendary dream of magpies was painted near the tomb.

Osney was (along with St Osyth, Cirencester, Llanthony, and Holy Trinity, London), one of the great Augustinian Canon Regular houses of medieval England. It provided six of the canons of Henry II’s re-foundation of the Church of the Holy Cross, Waltham as an Augustinian house in 1177. When Waltham became an abbey in 1184, the first abbot was a canon of Osney. In 1199, the church of St George in Oxford Castle was translated and annexed to the abbey.

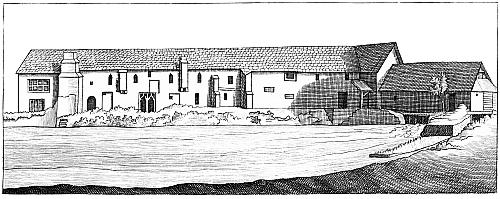
Woodcut from a sketch that Thomas Hearne made of the abbey, published in 1720.

The most significant event in the history of the abbey came in April 1222 when the Synod of Oxford met there, charged with applying the Lateran decrees in England. When in July 1237, the papal legate Cardinal Otto Candidus came to Osney, a brawl broke out between a group of scholars from the university and the cardinal's men in which the legate's cook was killed. Otto himself was locked for safety in the abbey tower, emerging unscathed to lay the city under interdict in reprisal.

The current navigation of the River Thames, replacing the old navigation to the east side of Osney Island, is believed to have been engineered by the canons of the abbey to turn their mill.

After the abbey's surrender in 1539, it was, from September 1542 until June 1544, the seat of the new Bishops of Oxford before the see transferred to the new foundation of Christ Church. It has been described as the greatest building Oxford has lost. Great Tom, the bell described as the "loudest thing in Oxford", now hanging in Tom Tower at Christ Church, was taken from the tower of Osney Abbey on its dissolution. A good deal of the monastic property was also transferred to Christ Church, and the remains of the abbey remained as a source of building material for the city and by Charles I during the English Civil War. Drawings of the remains were commissioned by John Aubrey in 1640, and the much reduced ruins were drawn by Thomas Hearne of St Edmund Hall in 1720.

== Burials ==
- Ela Longespée
- Edith Forne

== Today ==
All the buildings have now been destroyed except a rubble and timber-framed structure which may date from the 15th century. The remnants were Grade II listed in 1954.

On the same site is the long disused Osney Mill, now converted to housing, close to Osney Lock. To the east is Osney Cemetery and to the south is Osney Mill Marina, on a 500m long island originally formed for the mill. To the north are the busy arterial road leading west out of Oxford, Botley Road, and Oxford railway station.

== Bibliography ==
- Margaret Dickens, History of Hook Norton 912 to 1928
- E.B. Fryde et al., eds, Handbook of British Chronology, 3rd edition (London: Royal Historical Society, 1986)
- David Knowles and R. Neville Hadcock, Medieval Religious Houses of England and Wales (London: Longman, 1971)
- George Lipscomb, The History and Antiquities of the County of Buckingham (1847)
- Jan Morris, Oxford, 3rd edition (Oxford: Oxford University Press, 2001)
- Page, William, ed. (1907). Victoria County History: A History of the County of Oxford, Volume 2. Archibald Constable & Co. pp. 90–93.
- Crossley, Alan, ed. (1979). Victoria County History: A History of the County of Oxford, Volume 4. pp. 364–368.
- W.A. Pantin, 'The Fourteenth Century' in The English Church and the Papacy in the Middle Ages, ed by C.H. Lawrence (Stroud: Sutton Publishing, 1999 (1965))
- Maurice Powicke, Stephen Langton (Oxford: Clarendon Press, 1928)
- Sherwood, Jennifer; Pevsner, Nikolaus (1974). The Buildings of England: Oxfordshire. Harmondsworth: Penguin Books. p. 334. ISBN 0-14-071045-0.
- Postles, Dave (2008). Oseney Abbey Studies (PDF). Leicester.
- Postles, David (January 1985). "The Learning of Austin Canons: the Case of Oseney Abbey". Nottingham Medieval Studies. 29: 32–43. doi:10.1484/J.NMS.3.123. ISSN 0078-2122.
- Postles, David (1 February 1987). "'Patronus et advocatus noster': Oseney Abbey and the Oilly family". Historical Research. 60 (141): 100–102. doi:10.1111/j.1468-2281.1987.tb00488.x. ISSN 0950-3471.
- Oseney abbey.; Salter, H. E. (1936) [1929]. Cartulary of Oseney abbey. Oxford Historical Society. v. 89-91, 97-98, 101. Oxford: Clarendon Press for the Oxford Historical Society.
