= Statute of the Jewry =

1275 statute restricting Jews in England

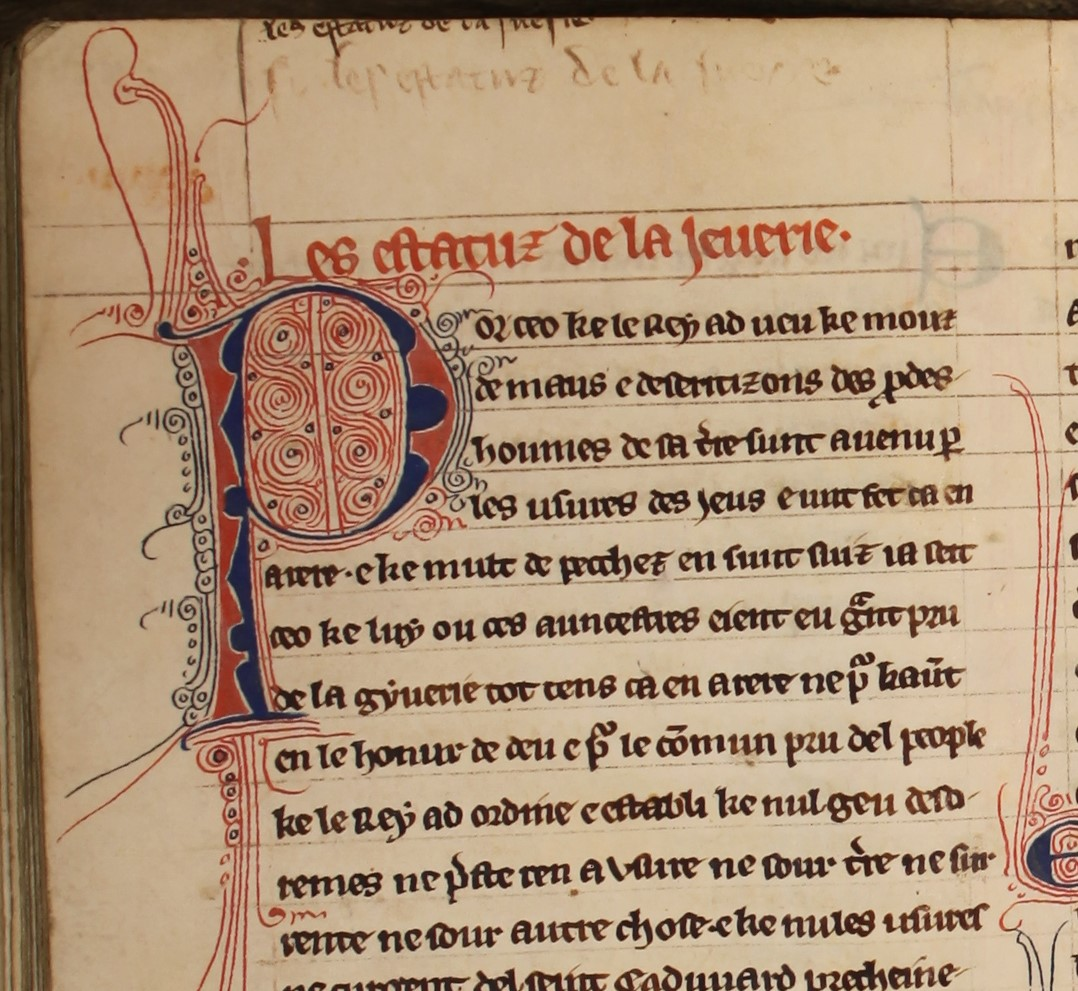
Extract of the Statute of Jewry, c. 1275

The Statute of the Jewry (Statutum de Judaismo, 1275) was a statute enacted under Edward I of England in 1275. It placed a number of restrictions on Jews of England, most notably outlawing the practice of usury.

== Context ==
Since the time of the Norman Conquest, Jews had been filling a small but vital role in the English economy. Usury by Christians was forbidden at the time by the Catholic Church, but Jews were permitted to act as moneylenders and bankers. That enabled some Jews to amass tremendous wealth, but also earned them enmity, which added to the increasing antisemitic sentiments of the time, due to widespread indebtedness and financial ruin among the Gentile population.

Edward I returned from the Crusades in 1274, two years after his accession as King of England, and found that land had become a commodity, and that many of his subjects had become dispossessed and were in danger of destitution. Jews traded land for money, and land was often mortgaged to Jewish moneylenders. In January 1275 Edward's mother, the Queen Dowager Eleanor of Provence, expelled the Jews from all of her lands, a precursor to the Statute enacted later the same year.

As special direct subjects of the monarch, Jews could be taxed indiscriminately by the King. Some have described this situation as indirect usury: the monarch permitted and encouraged Jews to practise usury and then taxed the profit. In the years leading up to the Statute, Edward taxed them heavily to help finance his forthcoming military campaigns in Wales, which began in 1277. One theory holds that he had exhausted the financial resources of the Jewish community when the Statute was passed in 1275.

== Provisions ==
- Usury was outlawed in every form.
- Debtors of Jews were no longer liable for certain debts.
- Jews were not allowed to live outside certain cities and towns.
- Any Jew above the age of seven had to wear a yellow badge of felt in the form of Two Tablets Joined on his or her outer clothing, six inches by three inches.
- All Jews from the age of 12 on had to pay a special tax of three pence annually.
- Christians were forbidden to live among Jews.
- Jews were licensed to buy farmland to make their living for the next 15 years.
- Jews could thenceforth make a living in England only as merchants, farmers, craftsmen or soldiers.

The provisions applied to both men and women. The license to buy land was included so that farming, along with trading, could give Jews an opportunity to earn a living with the abolition of usury. Unfortunately, other provisions along with widespread prejudice made this difficult for many.
