= Osney Cemetery =

Cemetery in Oxford, England

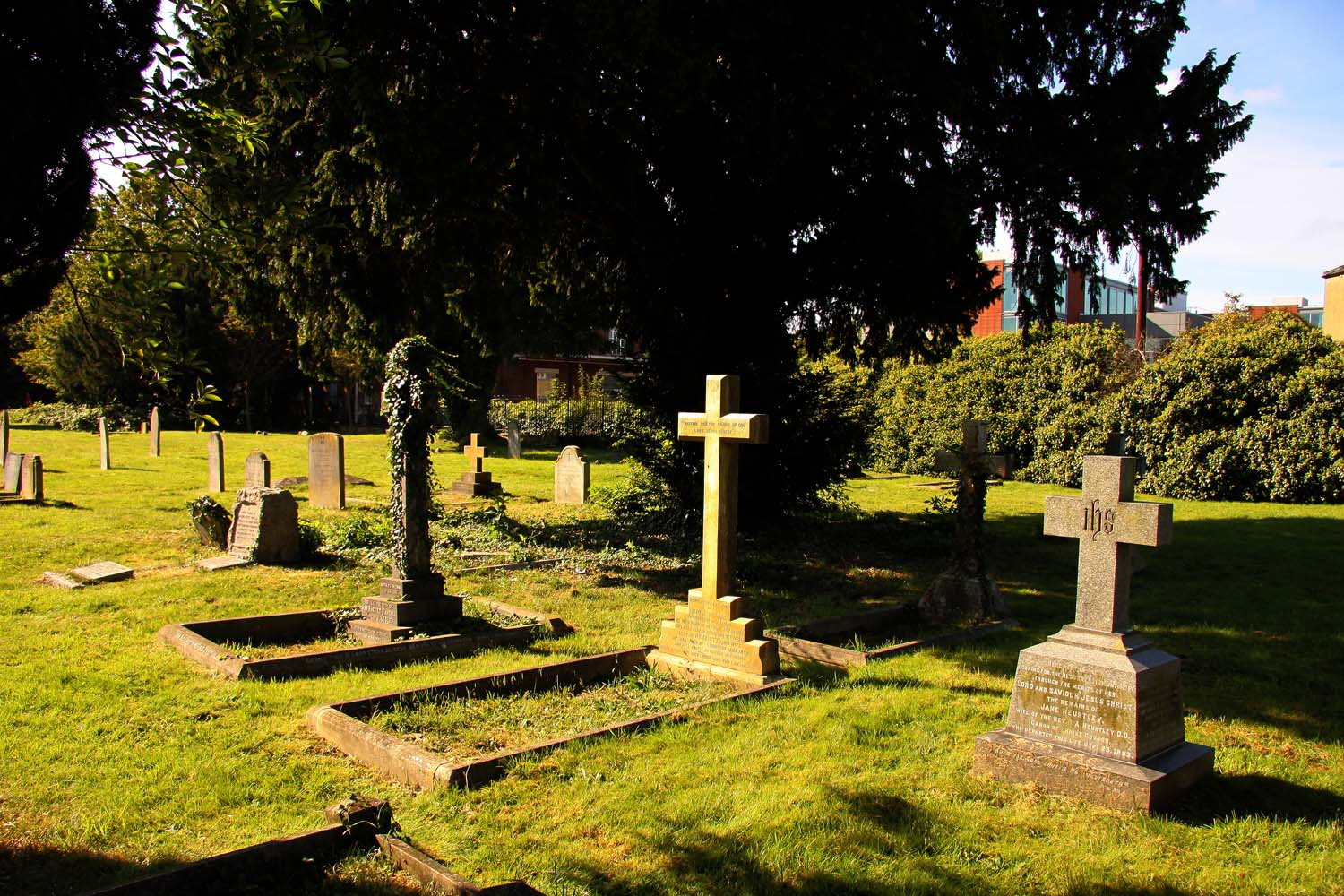
- Gravestones in Osney Cemetery
- Interactive map of Osney Cemetery

Details
- Established: 1848
- Closed: 1960
- Location: Osney, Oxford
- Country: United Kingdom
- Coordinates: 51.749747°N 1.269941°W
- Type: Anglican

Osney Cemetery (also known as Osney St Mary Cemetery) is a disused Church of England cemetery in Osney, west Oxford, England. Its entrance is in Osney Lane, which runs off the south end of Mill Street, south of Botley Road and near the site of Osney Abbey. It borders the Cherwell Valley Line railway a short distance south of Oxford railway station.

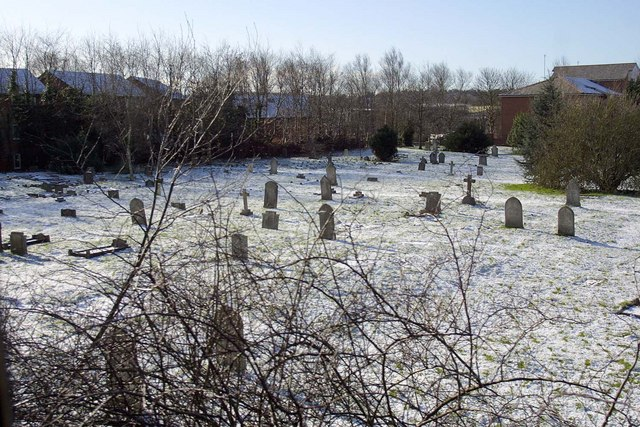
View of Osney Cemetery in winter

The cemetery was established in Oxford in 1848, along with Holywell Cemetery and St Sepulchre's Cemetery, because central Oxford churchyards were becoming full. In 1855, new burials were forbidden at all Oxford city churches, apart from in existing vaults.

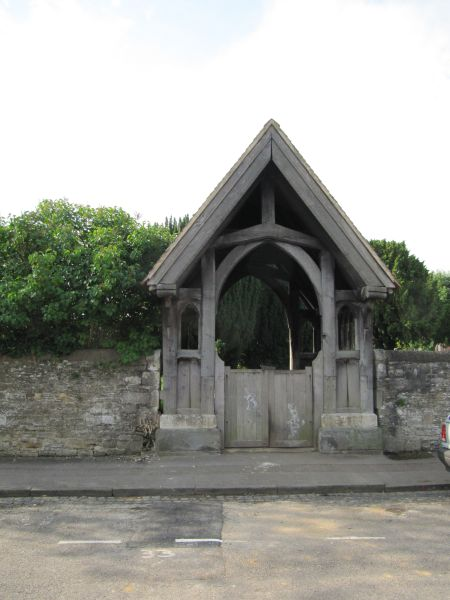
Lych gate entrance to the cemetery

Each of these three new parish cemeteries provided an extension to the churchyards for a specific group of nearby churches, with each church having its own area. Osney Cemetery covered the four ancient parishes of St Aldate's, St Ebbe’s, St Peter-le-Bailey, and St Thomas, and the new parish of Holy Trinity, which had been taken out of St Ebbe’s parish in 1845. The burials in Osney Cemetery are recorded in the parish register for each of these churches just as if they had taken place in its actual churchyard. From 1872, the dead of the new church of St Frideswide, whose parish had been taken out of that of St Thomas, were also buried in Osney Cemetery.

Christ Church was still an extra-parochial non-royal peculiar (exempt from the jurisdiction of the diocese) when Osney Cemetery opened, but by 1901 it had been given space in the St Thomas's section of Osney Cemetery called "Christ Church portion".

The entrance to Osney Cemetery has a lych gate.

The cemetery contains 26 Commonwealth war graves from the First World War and also one British soldier killed in the Second World War.

The cemetery was closed to new burials in 1960, and the chapel was demolished in 1963. It is still a large green space in central Oxford. In 2006, it was proposed to plant more native trees in the area.

== Some notable interments ==
- Charles Bigg (1840–1908), Church of England clergyman, theologian, and church historian
- William Bright (1824–1901), English ecclesiastical historian and Anglican priest
- Charles Abel Heurtley (1806–1895), English theologian
- Kenneth Escott Kirk (1886–1954), Bishop of Oxford

== See also ==
- Holywell Cemetery
- St Sepulchre's Cemetery
- Wolvercote Cemetery
