= Rewley =

Rewley may refer to:

- Rewley Abbey, Oxford, England
- Rewley House, Kellogg College, Oxford, England

== See also ==
- Oxford Rewley Road railway station, Oxford, England
