= Sheepwash Channel Railway Bridge =

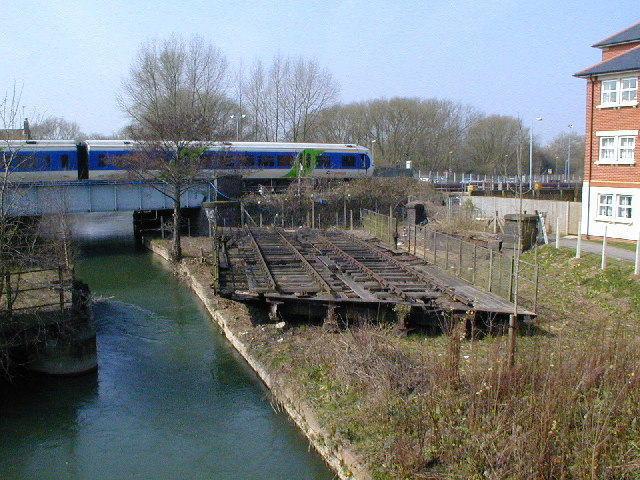
- The Sheepwash Channel Railway Bridge with the old Rewley Road Swing Bridge in the foreground, on the Sheepwash Channel
- Coordinates: 51.755586°N 1.270946°W
- Carries: Cherwell Valley Line
- Crosses: Sheepwash Channel
- Locale: Oxford, England
- Maintained by: Network Rail

Characteristics
- Design: Girder bridge
- Material: Steel
- No. of spans: 1

Sheepwash Channel Railway Bridge is a railway bridge over Sheepwash Channel in west Oxford, England, just north of Oxford railway station. To the north are Cripley Meadow and Fiddler's Island. To the south are Osney Island and the Botley Road.

The bridge is close to Rewley Road Swing Bridge just to the east, an older and now disused swing bridge for the former Buckinghamshire Railway line of London and North Western Railway that used to serve the Oxford Rewley Road railway station. It is also close to Rewley Road Bridge to the east. Sheepwash channel links the River Thames with the Oxford Canal via Castle Mill Stream and Isis Lock.

== Gallery ==
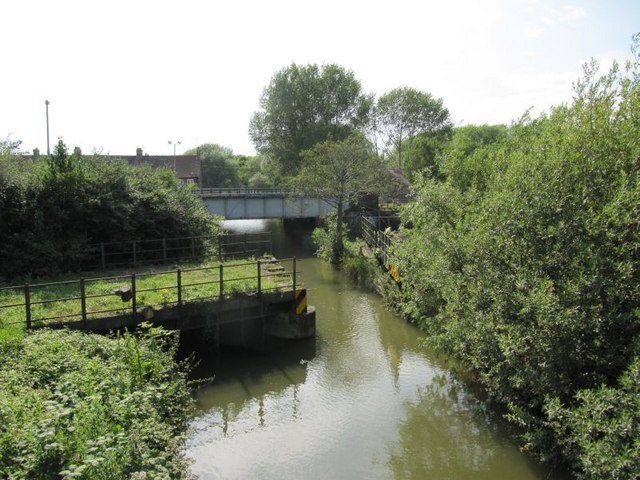
View of the Sheepwash Channel Railway Bridge in the background and the site of the old Rewley Road Swing Bridge in the foreground

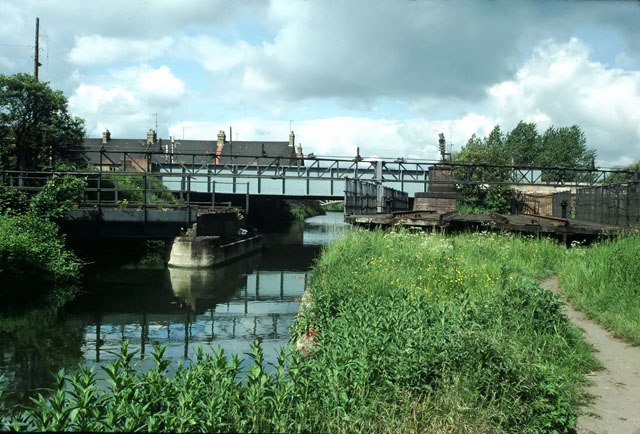
The Sheepwash Channel with the new railway bridge and the old railway swing bridge

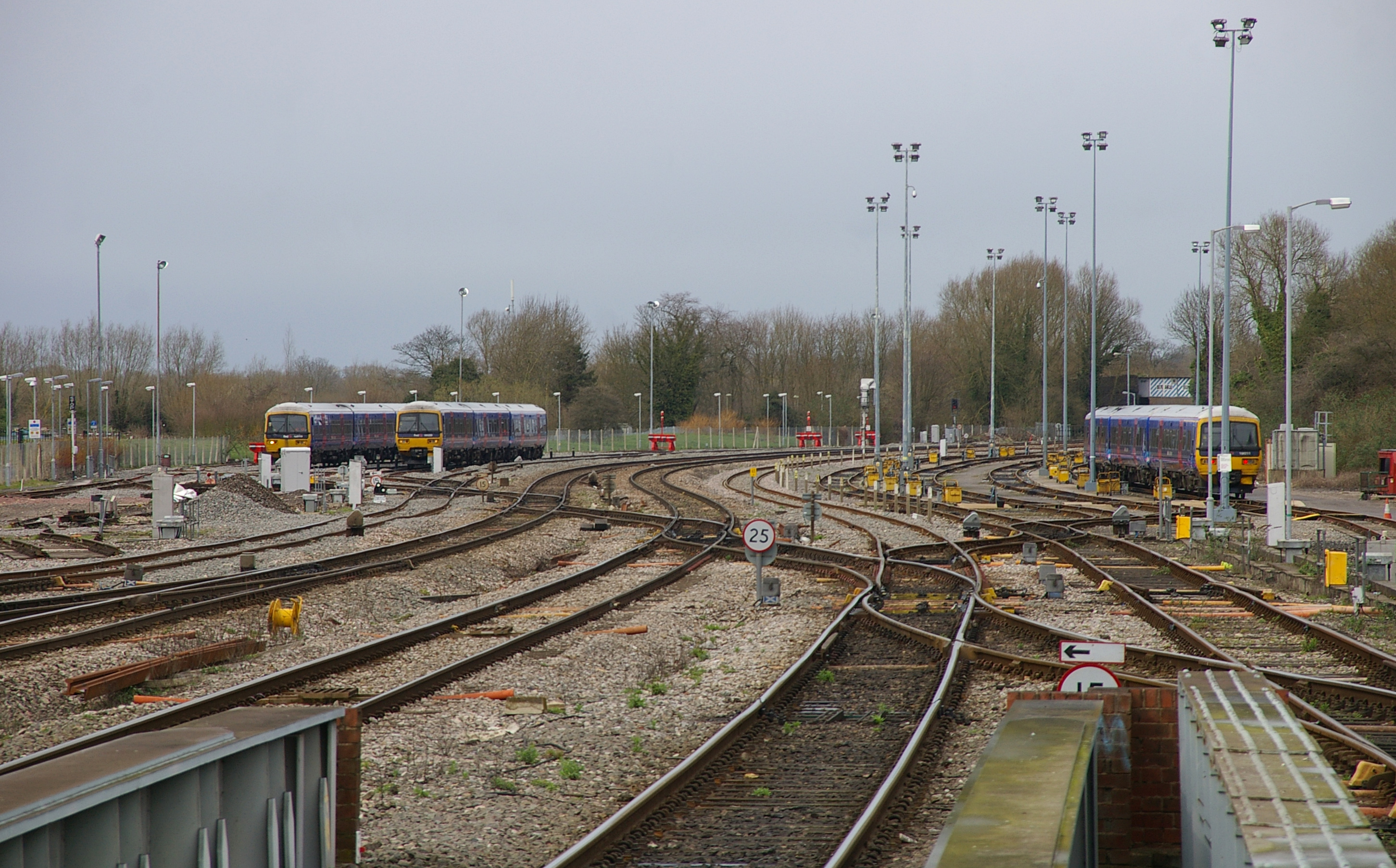
Looking north along the railway line from Oxford railway station over Sheepwash Channel Railway Bridge towards Cripley Meadow
