= Rewley Road =

Road in Oxford, England

Coordinates: 51.755619°N 1.270077°W

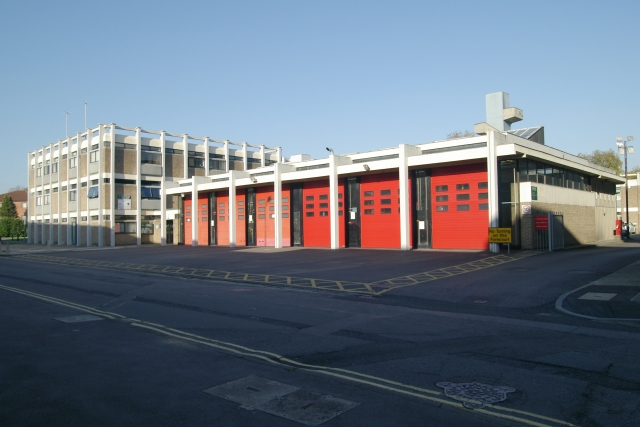
Rewley Road fire station.

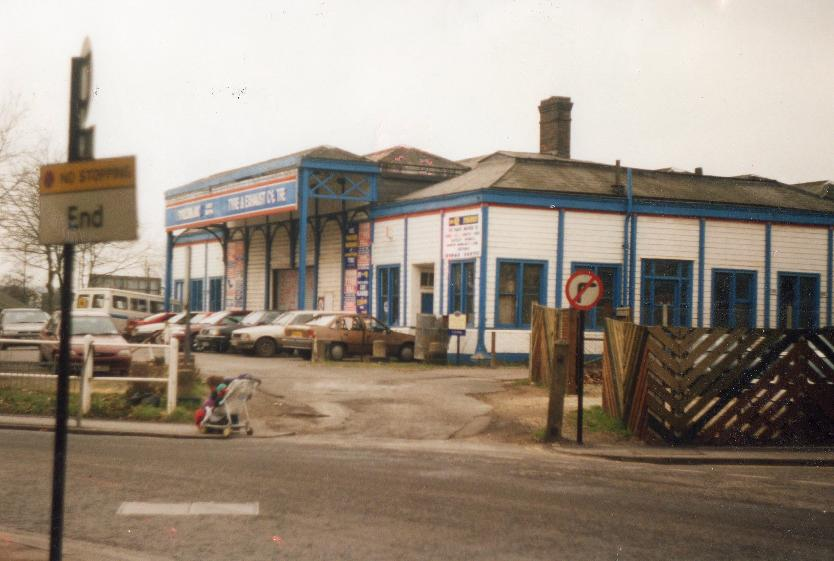
Oxford Rewley Road railway station near the southern end of Rewley Road in 1994 before its demolition.

Rewley Road is in the west of central Oxford, England. It is located in St Thomas's parish.

== History ==
The name derives from Rewley Abbey. A Rewley Lane (or Ruley Lane) existed in 1538.

Oxford Rewley Road railway station used to be located here, originally built in 1851. The building was finally demolished to make way for the Said Business School of Oxford University. Coal wharves and merchants were also located here,< but the road has more recently been developed with housing.

== Location ==
The road runs north from Frideswide Square at the junctions with Hythe Bridge Street and Park End Street. It spans Sheepwash Channel on Rewley Road Bridge to the east of Rewley Road Swing Bridge, a disused railway swing bridge and Sheepwash Channel Railway Bridge, which carries the main line north from Oxford railway station.

== Buildings ==
The Cistercian house Rewley Abbey, founded in 1280, was located here on the banks of a branch of the River Thames. Virtually all the original buildings have disappeared, but there is still a 15th-century doorway in a wall on the west side of the Oxford Canal, within a housing development.

Beaver House, on the corner of Rewley Road and Hythe Bridge Street, was erected in 1971–72, designed by the Oxford Architects Partnership. It is clad in reeded concrete with a glass curtain wall facing Hythe Bridge Street.

Rewley Road fire station is on the eastern side of the road, opposite the Said Business School.

== Bibliography ==
- Tyack, Geoffrey (1998). Oxford: An architectural Guide. Oxford University Press. ISBN 0-19-817419-5.
