= Sarah Cooper (marmalade maker) =

English marmalade maker (1848–1932)

Sarah Jane Cooper
- Born: Sarah Jane Gill; 1848; Beoley, Worcestershire, England
- Died: 1932 (aged 83–84)
- Burial place: Wolvercote Cemetery
- Occupations: Grocer and marmalade maker
- Spouse: Frank Cooper

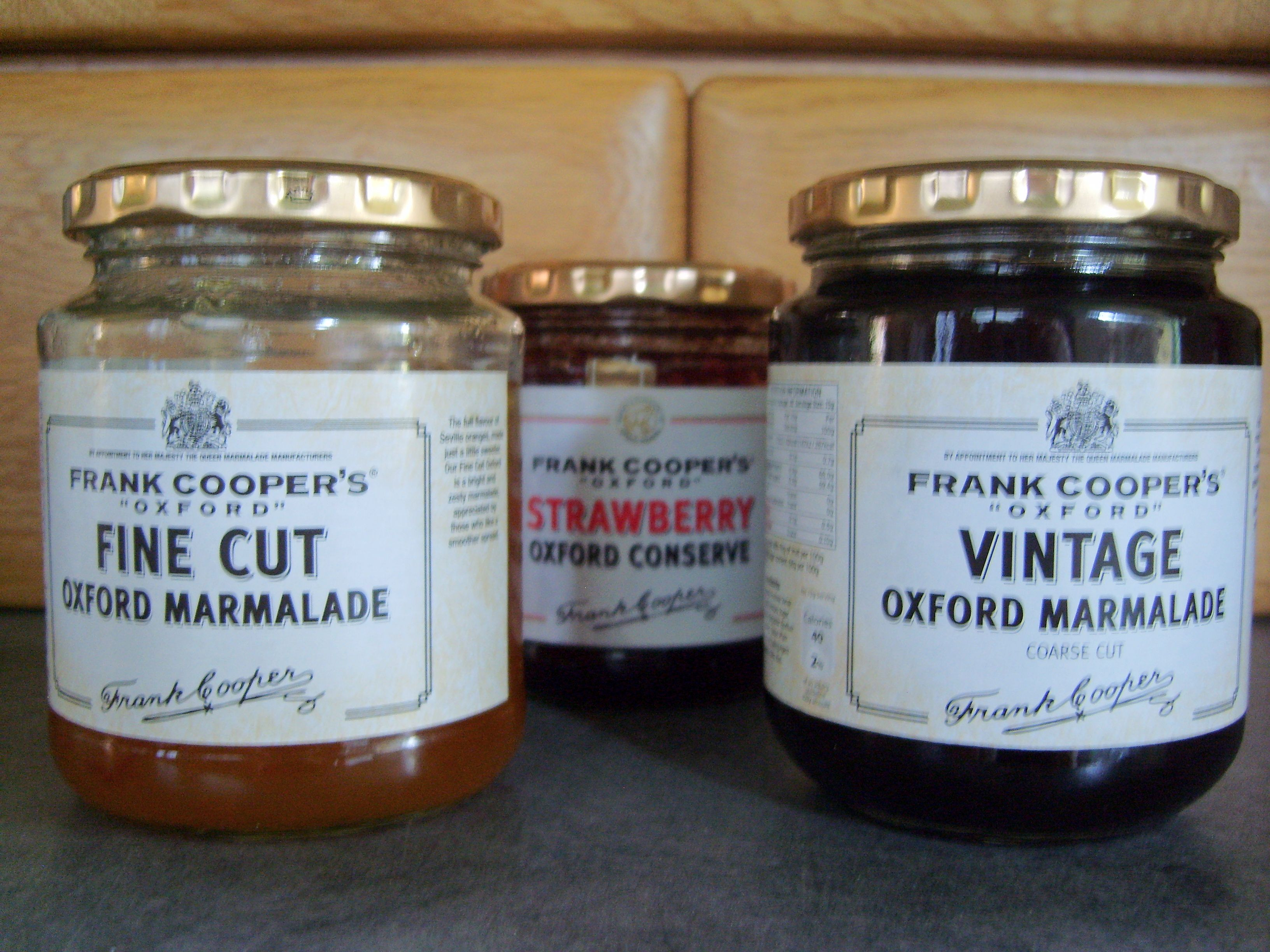
Oxford Marmalade, originally made by Sarah Cooper

Sarah Jane Cooper (1848–1932) was an English marmalade maker and wife of Frank Cooper (1844–1927).

Sarah Cooper was born Sarah Jane Gill in Beoley, Worcestershire in 1848. In 1872 she got married in Clifton, Bristol to Frank Cooper of Oxford and they made their home at 31 Kingston Road, Oxford.

In 1867, Frank Cooper had inherited the family grocery shop at 84 High Street, Oxford. In 1874 Frank expanded the business into 83 High Street next door, and the Coopers gave up their house in Kingston Road to live over the shop. Sarah, then aged 24, made 76 pounds (34 kg) of marmalade to her own recipe. The marmalade became a regular product of Frank Cooper's business, being made behind the shop until 1903 when he moved production to a new purpose-built factory at 27 Park End Street.

Frank Cooper's business was taken over in 1964 and production left Oxford in 1967. However, its marmalades and jams remain in production as a brand of Premier Foods, which continues to call its leading Frank Cooper's product "Oxford" Marmalade. Since 2001, 84 High Street has been marked by an Oxfordshire Blue Plaque commemorating Sarah Cooper's achievement.

== Sources and further reading ==
- Allen, Brigid (1989). Cooper's Oxford. ISBN 0-9514658-0-5.
- Woolley, Liz (2010). "Industrial Architecture in Oxford, 1870 to 1914". Oxoniensia. LXXV. Oxfordshire Architectural and Historical Society: 91–94. ISSN 0308-5562.
