= Frank Cooper's =

British marmalade and jam brand

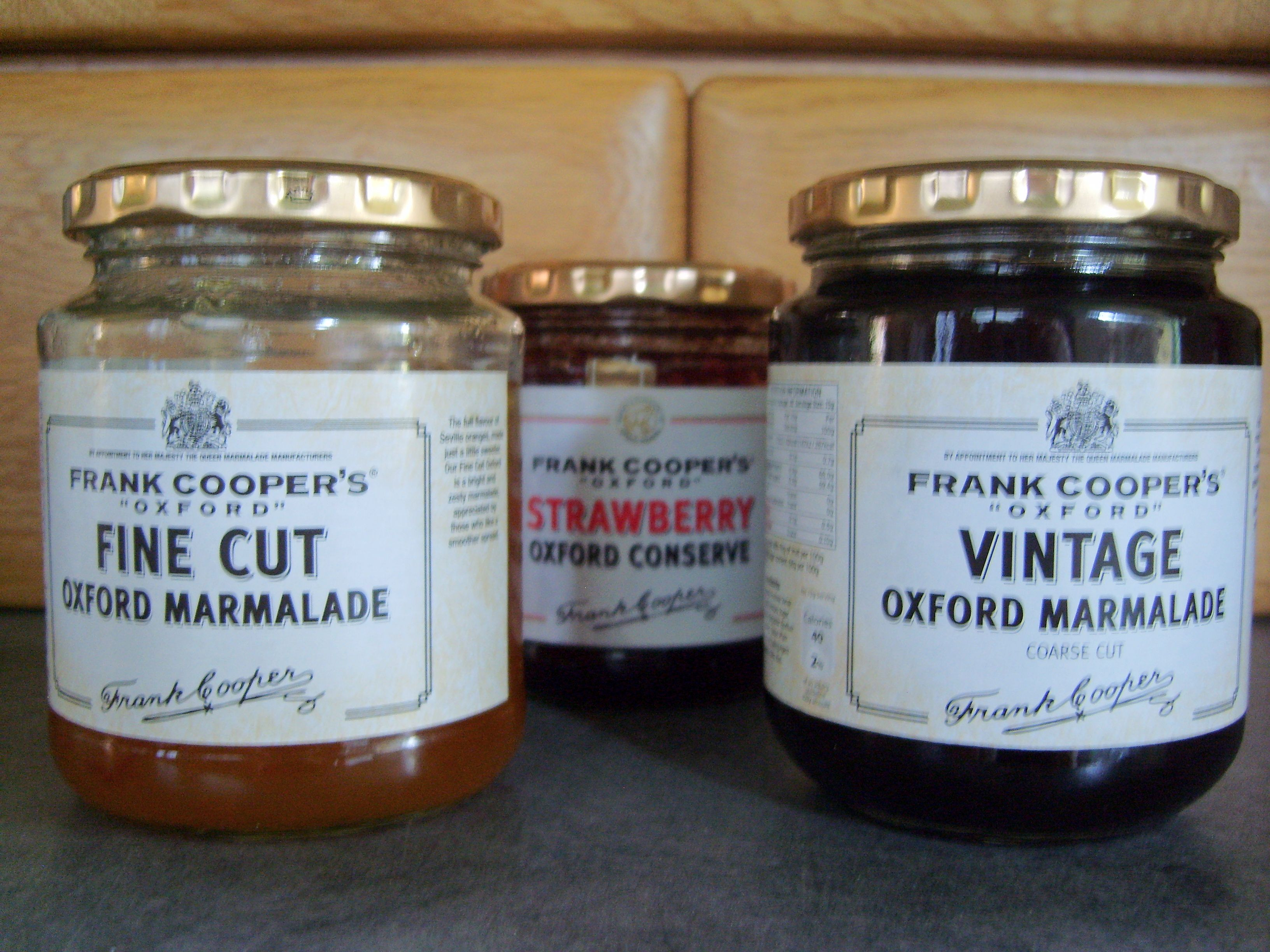
- Three jars of Frank Cooper's products
- Current owner: Hain Celestial Group
- Country: United Kingdom
- Introduced: 1874
- Website: frankcoopers.co.uk

Frank Cooper's is a British brand of marmalades and jams owned by Hain Daniels. Frank Cooper's is known primarily for its "Oxford" Marmalade and holds a Royal Warrant. The brand was created by Sarah Cooper in 1874 and as of 2012 is a brand of Hain Celestial Group.

== History ==
=== 1874–1919: early history ===
Francis Thomas Cooper (1811–1862) was originally a hatter and hosier with a shop at 46 High Street, Oxford. He then became an agent for Ridgeway's Tea and in about 1845 converted his shop into a grocery.

In 1856 F. T. Cooper paid £2,350 for the remainder of a forty-year lease on Nos. 83 and 84 High Street, which were opposite his earlier premises. He ran 84 as a grocery shop and his family home. In 1867 his son, Frank Cooper (1844–1927) inherited the business and expanded the shop into No. 83 next door.

In 1874 Frank Cooper's wife Sarah-Jane (1848–1932), made 76 pounds (34 kg) of marmalade to her own recipe. The marmalade proved popular, and until 1903 was made at 83–84 High Street. Frank Cooper then moved production to a new purpose-built factory at 27 Park End Street. He retained the High Street premises as a shop until 1919, when he sold it to Twinings.

=== 1920–1950: Park End Street factory ===
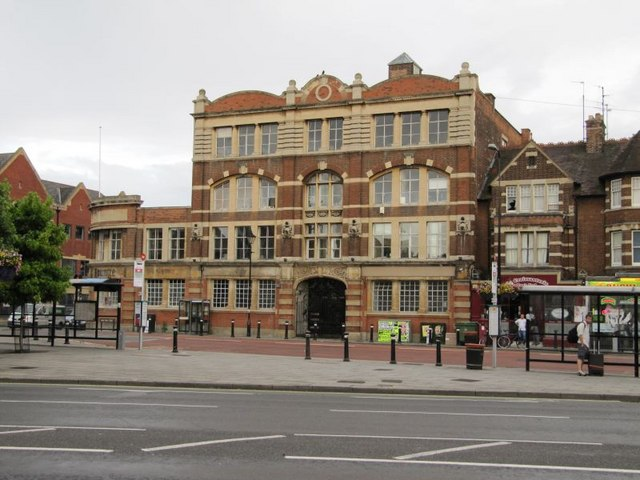
Cooper's former factory in Frideswide Square

The Park End Street factory was designed by Oxford architect Herbert Quinton and built by long-established local builder Thomas Henry Kingerlee. The four-storey, 1,630 square feet (151 m^{2}) factory had separate floors for cutting fruit and bottling the finished product, and the third floor included a separate cloakroom and staff dining room for employees. Boiling the marmalade and jam was in a separate building at the back of the yard behind the main factory. Quinton designed the premises in compliance with the Factory and Workshop Act 1901, and the difficulty of complying with the Act at 83–84 High Street may have prompted the building of the new factory.

The factory was strategically sited close to the stations and goods yards of both the London and North Western Railway at Rewley Road and the Great Western Railway in Botley Road, making the delivery of fruit and sugar, distribution of marmalade and jam and business travel for company personnel, suppliers and trade customers as efficient as possible. Success of the business led to expansion of the factory in 1912, 1915, 1924 and 1925, using land between the 1903 building and the corner of Hollybush Row.

Frank Cooper's marmalade was especially popular with dons and students in Oxford University. It was taken to Antarctica on Robert Falcon Scott's expedition to the South Pole. A jar was found buried in the ice many years after the ill-fated expedition.

In Arthur Ransome's children's book Missee Lee, Miss Lee, the leader of the Chinese pirates, had been educated at Cambridge University but learned to enjoy Cooper's Oxford Marmalade. As she says, "We always eat Oxford marmalade at Cambridge. Better scholars, better professors at Cambridge but better marmalade at Oxford."

=== 1951 to present: further moves and takeover ===
After the Second World War Frank Cooper's bought the site of the ice rink and Majestic Cinema west of the railway stations on the north side of Botley Road. A new factory was built on the site and the company moved production there from Park End Street.

The company also manufactured mint sauce and horseradish sauce in a separate building at the side of the Bulstake stream. In the summer months, they replaced marmalade production with fruit jams, such as strawberry. Both marmalade and jam could also be purchased in "fancy jars", two sizes of china jars with matching lids, painted with designs such as "crinoline ladies".

Brown & Polson Ltd. bought Frank Cooper's in 1964 and moved production away from Oxford in 1967, but retained the "Oxford" name for the marmalade.

Some time between 1984 and 1987 Frank Cooper's again leased 84 and 85 High Street, running 85 as a museum and 84 as a shop until about 1990. Since 2001, 84 High Street has been marked by an Oxfordshire Blue Plaque commemorating Sarah Cooper's inception of Oxford Marmalade.

The former factory at 27 Park End Street (now part of Frideswide Square) survives and is a listed building. It is now called "The Jam Factory" and houses an arts centre, restaurant, and bar.

Heinz purchased Frank Cooper's in 1997. It was later sold to Rank Hovis McDougall which was acquired by Premier Foods in 2006. The brand was again sold in 2012, this time to Hain Celestial Group.

== Literature and popular culture ==
Oxford marmalade was mentioned by John Betjeman (1906–1984) in his poetry. It was also consumed by the fictional character James Bond in the 1957 spy novel From Russia, with Love.
