= Rewley Road Swing Bridge =

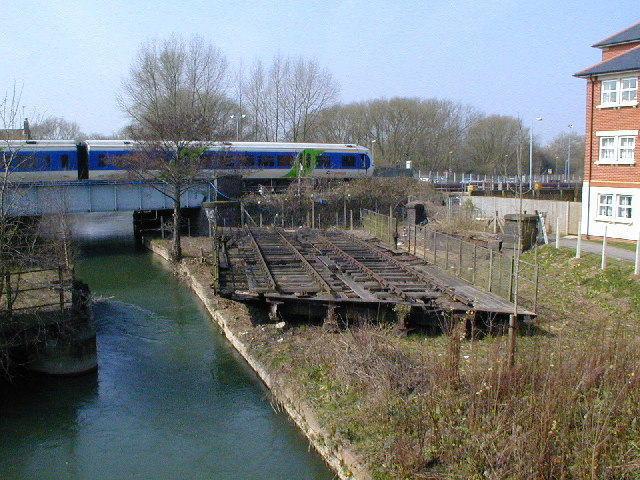
- The old Rewley Road Swing Bridge with the newer Sheepwash Channel Railway Bridge behind over the Sheepwash Channel.
- Coordinates: 51.755599°N 1.270721°W
- Carries: Buckinghamshire Railway
- Crosses: Sheepwash Channel
- Locale: Oxford, England
- Maintained by: Oxford Preservation Trust

Characteristics
- Design: Swing bridge
- Material: Steel girder
- No. of spans: 1

History
- Designer: Robert Stephenson
- Opened: 1851
- Closed: 1984

Location
- Interactive map of Rewley Road Swing Bridge

Rewley Road Swing Bridge is a disused railway swing bridge over Sheepwash Channel in west Oxford, England. To the north are Cripley Meadow and Fiddler's Island and to the south are Osney Island and the Botley Road.

The bridge was designed by Robert Stephenson and built in 1850–1. It was reconstructed in 1890 and 1906, latterly using steel girders. The bridge closed to passenger traffic in 1951 and to goods in 1984.

== Overview ==
The swing bridge was for the former Buckinghamshire Railway line of London and North Western Railway that used to serve the Oxford Rewley Road railway station (later London, Midland and Scottish Railway, LMS), which was on the site of the Saïd Business School. It is close to Rewley Road Bridge to the east and Sheepwash Channel Railway Bridge to the west, which also cross Sheepwash Channel.

== Restoration project ==
The bridge is one of two swing bridges in England that are scheduled monuments. In 2019, ownership passed from Network Rail to the Oxford Preservation Trust.

== Gallery ==
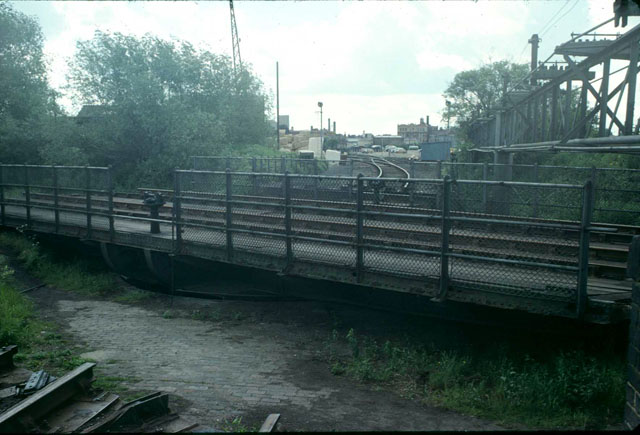
View of the swing bridge over Sheepwash Channel in 1977 when it was still in operation.

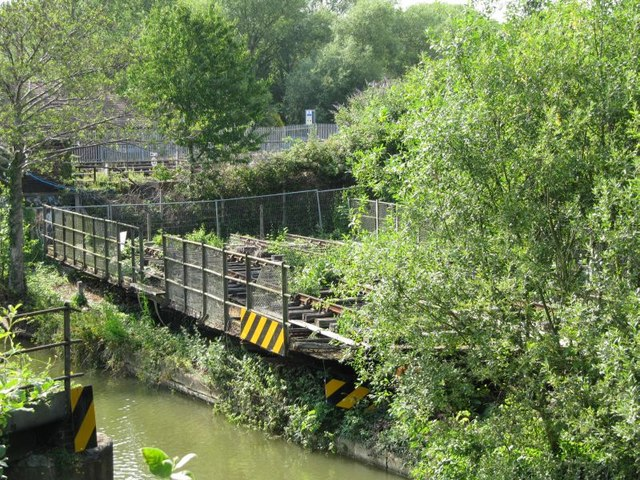
The swing bridge in the open position on the north bank of the Sheepwash Channel.

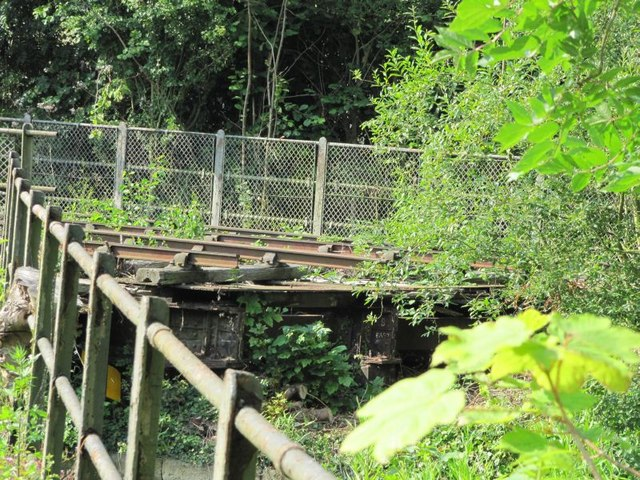
Close-up view of the end of the bridge.

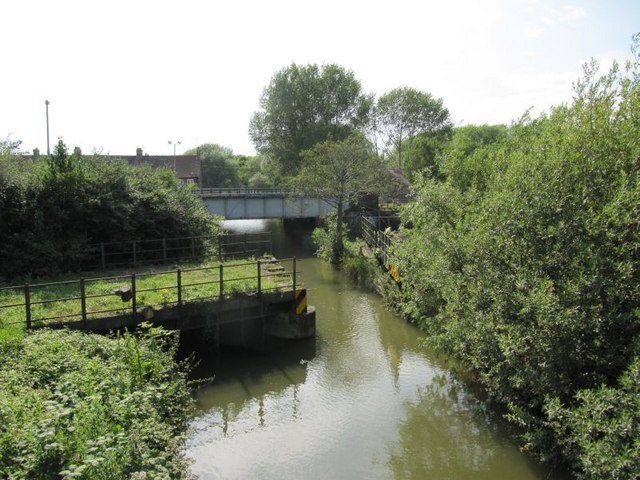
View of Sheepwash Channel, with the site of the old swing bridge in the foreground and the newer railway bridge in the background.

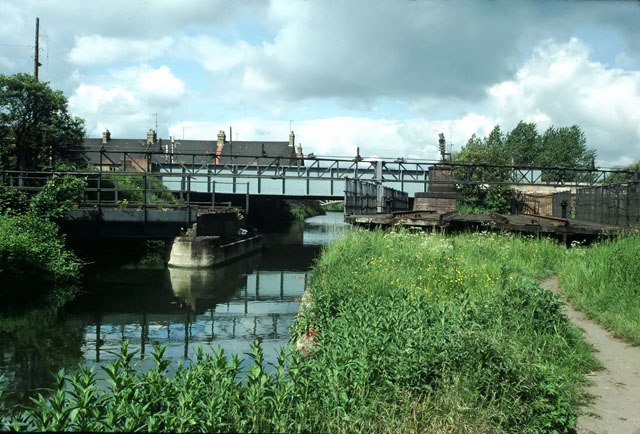
The Sheepwash Channel with the old swing bridge and the newer railway bridge behind.

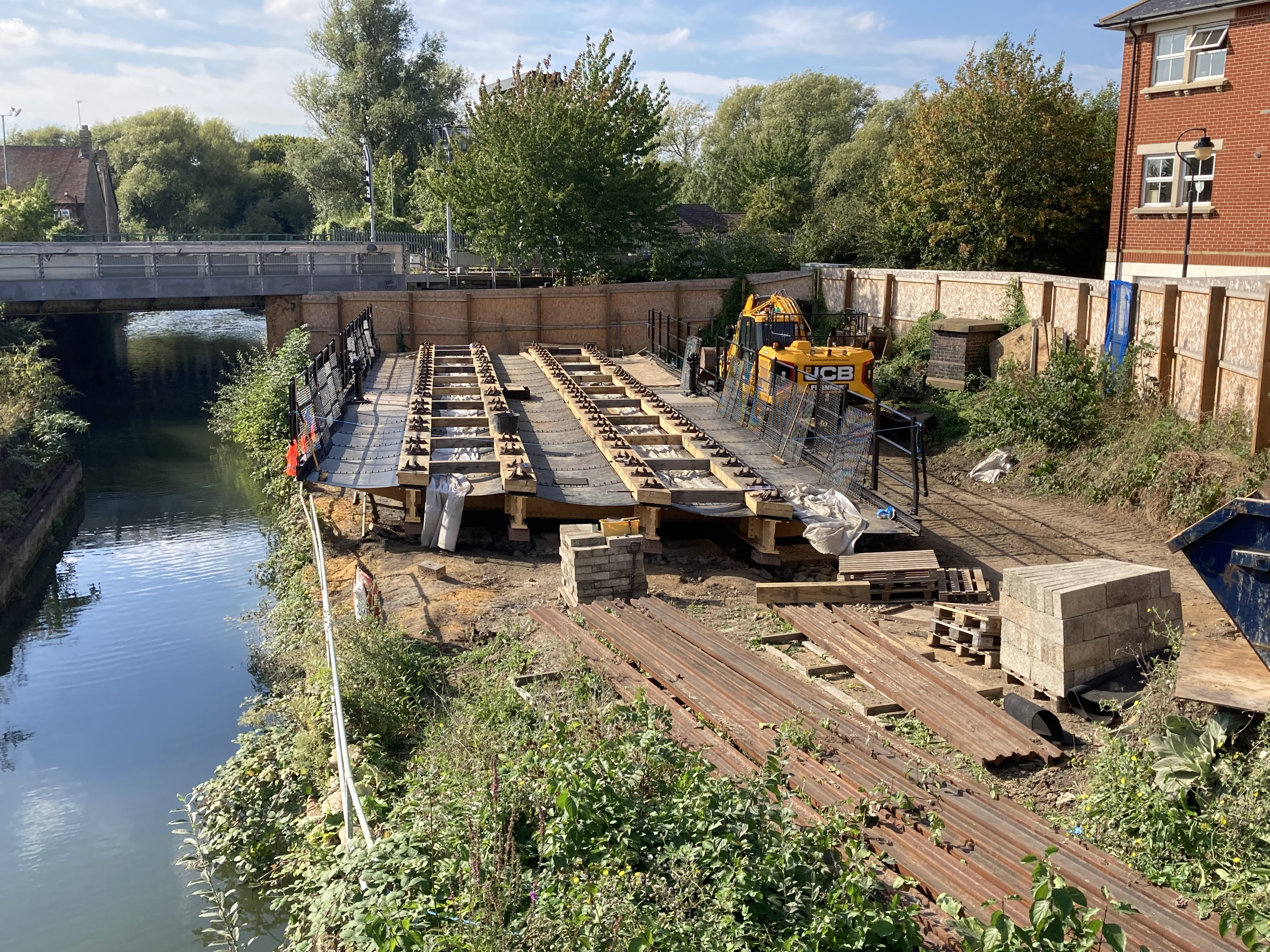
Rewley Road Swing Bridge undergoing restoration in September 2021.
