= The Lighthouse, Oxford =

Pub in central Oxford, England

Coordinates: 51.75289°N 1.26435°W

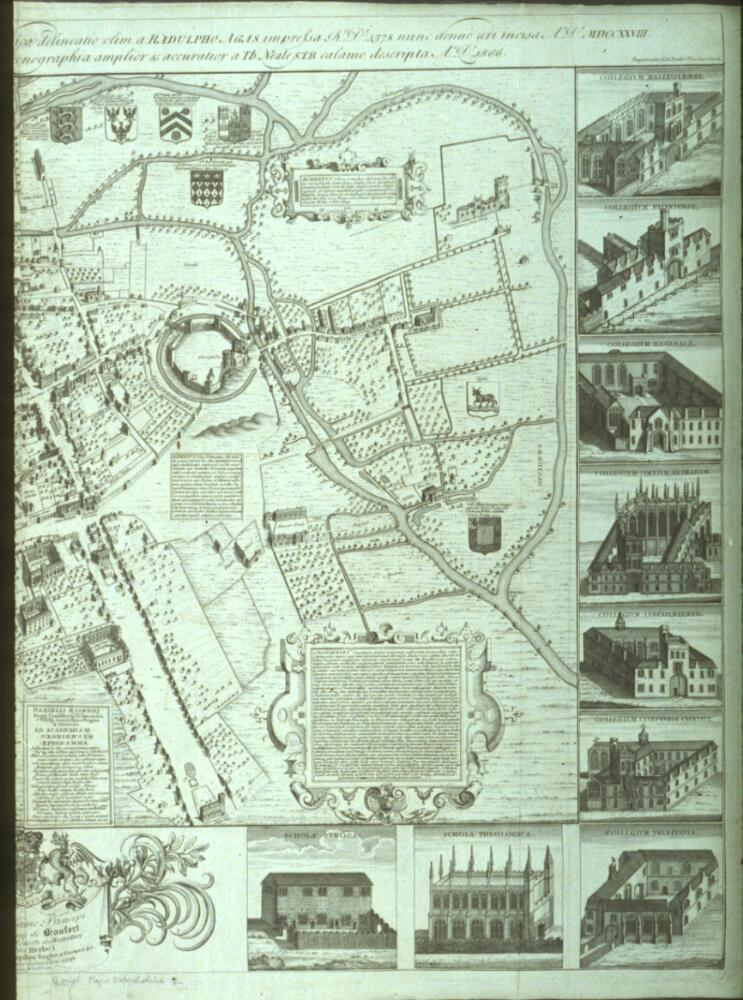
Ralph Agas' Map of 1578 shows an underdeveloped area to the north of St George's Tower, the current plot of the Lighthouse pub

The Lighthouse is a public house in central Oxford, England. The pub is located at 1 Park End Street, next to the Castle Mill Stream and close to the end of the Oxford Canal.

The site of the modern-day Lighthouse pub was within a stone's throw from the Norman city walls. Flanked on either side by the 11th century St George's Tower and Castle Mound, the area was part of the moat system guarding Oxford Castle. The area remained without significant development or residence until after 1790 opening of the Oxford Canal.

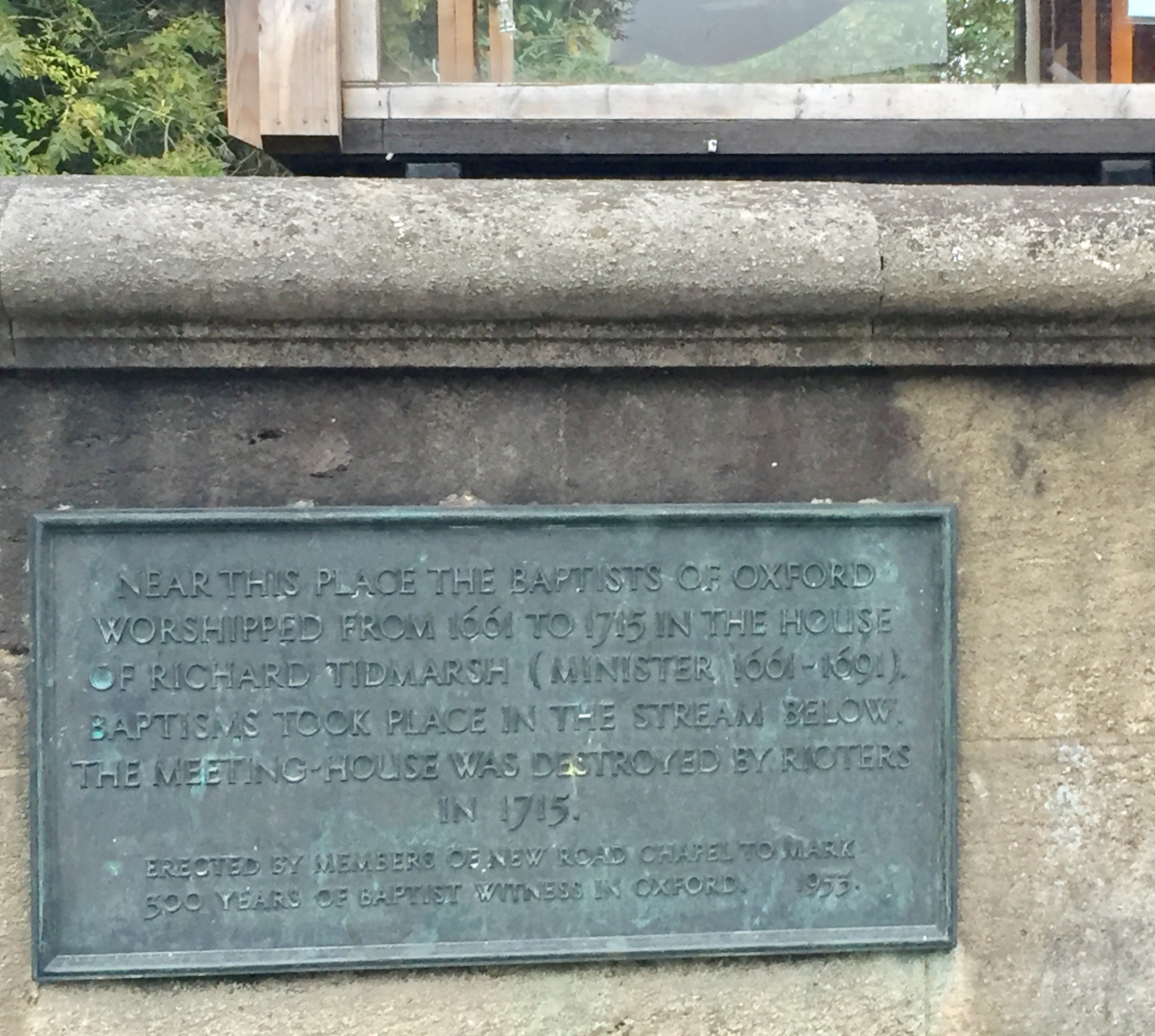
Inscription commemorating the 300 year anniversary of the Baptist community in Oxford on the former site of a Baptist meeting house destroyed in 1715. The balcony of the Lighthouse pub can be seen in the background.

== The Baptist Meeting House ==
There is reference to a Baptist meeting house in a plaque to the southwest of the pub. Originally constructed in the early 19th century, the Lighthouse now stands on the former site of this meeting house after it was destroyed in the nationwide Jacobite Rising of 1715. As the geography of the area changed over the centuries, so too did the address and facade of the pub. The earliest recorded entry of the public house has it located within St Thomas' parish. In the years ahead the pub would be addressed at Pacey's Bridge, Middle Fisher Row and Park End Street.

== From Racer's to Navigations End ==
A new industrial quarter to the west of Oxford arose around the high traffic of the Oxford Canal. Coal, transported along the canal directly to modern day Park End Street, resulted in the area becoming a hotbed of industry: breweries, bakeries, jam factories and more sprung up in what was undeveloped land. Though this particular public house benefitted from being adjacent to both a main canal artery and the Oxford Coal Wharf, it was far from being unique as the area dotted with taverns, all looking to attract the many factory and canal workers. In 1824, the pub is believed to have been called "Racers" and operated by a Mr C. Collier. By 1830 it was in the proprietorship of one James Pacey and is recorded as "Navigation's End" – deriving its name from the stream then referred to as "Old Navigation". One may reasonably deduce James was an affluent individual – he bequeathed his family name to the adjoining "Pacey's Bridge".

== The Queens Arms, the Mayor and Industry in the West End ==
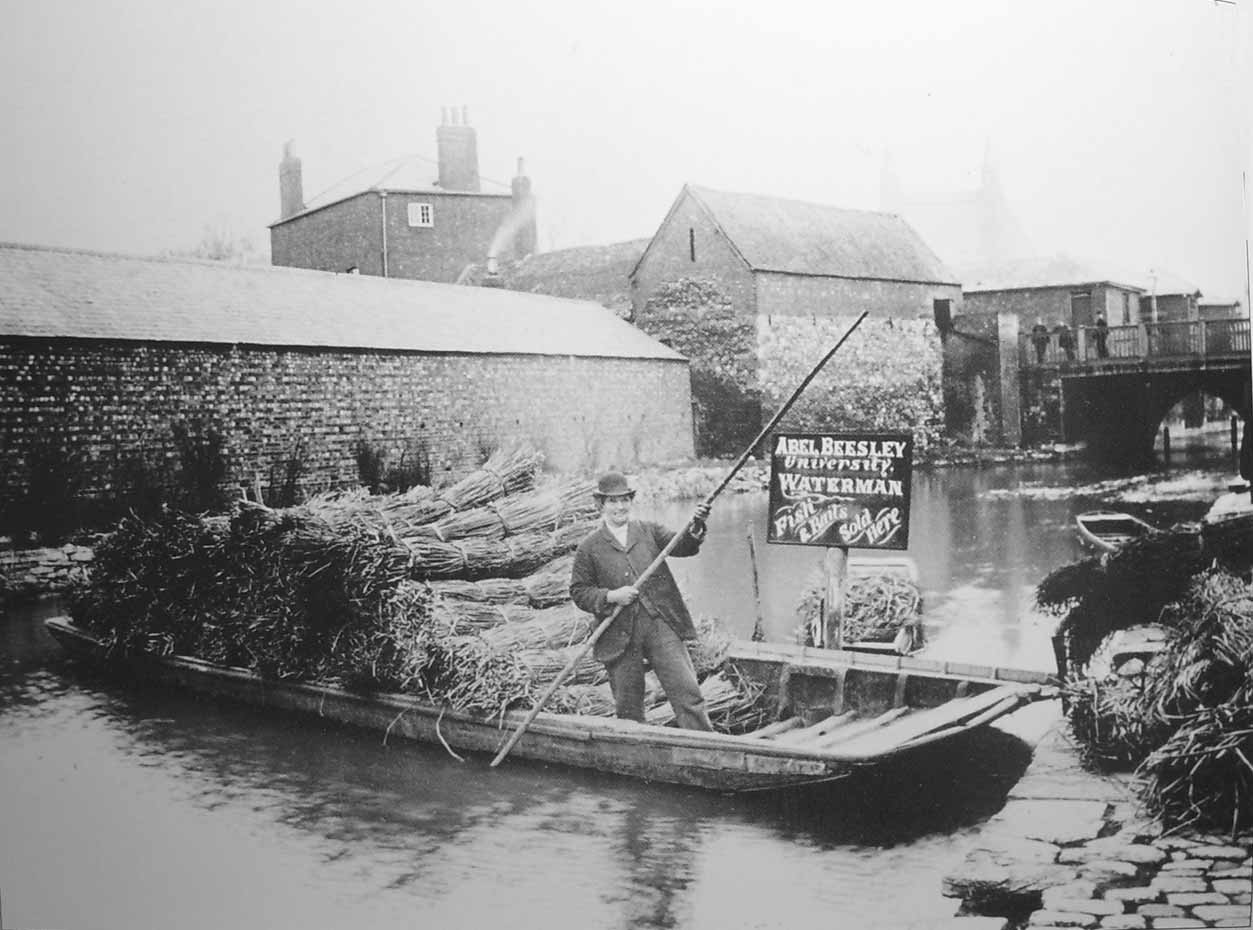
Taken by Henry Taunt in 1905, this photograph shows the charismatic Abel Beesley with the Queen's Arms pub in the background, adjacent to Pacey's Bridge

By 1863 the pub had changed significantly, it had been renamed "The Queen's Arms" in honour of Queen Charlotte and ownership had passed to Mr William Lucas. William, a saddler-turned-publican, raised a family in the residences above the pub. His eldest son, Thomas, was elected Mayor of Oxford in 1892 and also lay the foundation stone of the Town Hall the following year. The senior William Lucas died in 1866 (buried in nearby St Thomas Church) leaving his widow Mary to run the Queen's Arms.

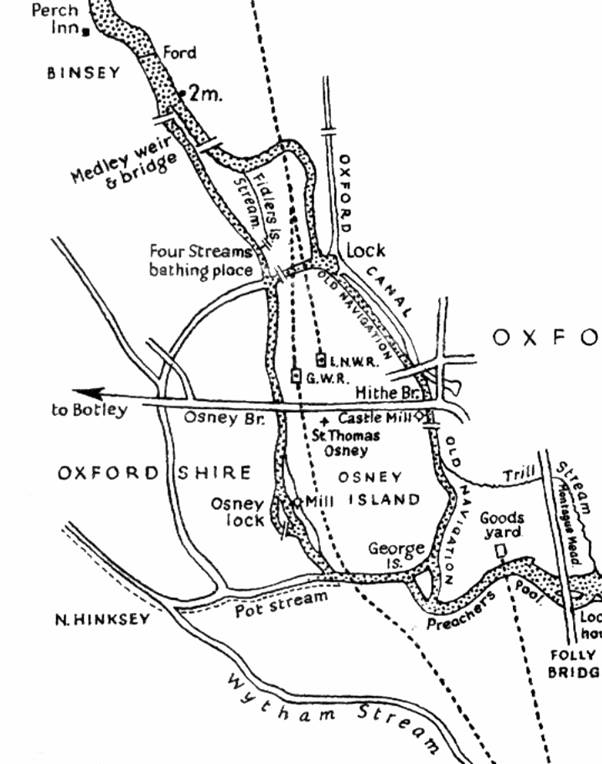
Fred Thacker's Map of Oxford's West End Canals in 1920

By 1876 the pub had passed into the hands of Albert Thornton and at last 1 Park End Street seemed to have found some stability in this period as the pub stayed in the Thornton family, possibly into the 1930s. This period saw great change in the West End of Oxford, the railway station at Frideswide Square gradually eroded away much of the canal trade. In 1913 William Morris (later Lord Nuffield), without licence, started his own bus service to compete with the city's cumbersome tram network. In 1951, Lord Nuffield further forced change when he acquired the Oxford Canal Basin and proceeded to fill it. Nuffield College and Worcester Street car park now stand where once lay the Basin. This was the death knell of the canal system as a competitive mode of transport in Oxford as technology replaced human labour. An apt example can be found in the reconstruction of Pacey's Bridge to withstand the weight of cars, but at the expense of closing the canal route. Such changes to the local landscape affected the demographic in the area and it seems the Queens Arms kept pace with the social evolution:

"sharply dressed salesmen from the many new motor showrooms on Park End Street and rail commuters of the post-war middle class replaced the patronage of perspiring boatmen and greasy industrial proletariat"

== Rosie O'Gradys and Morrells Brewery ==
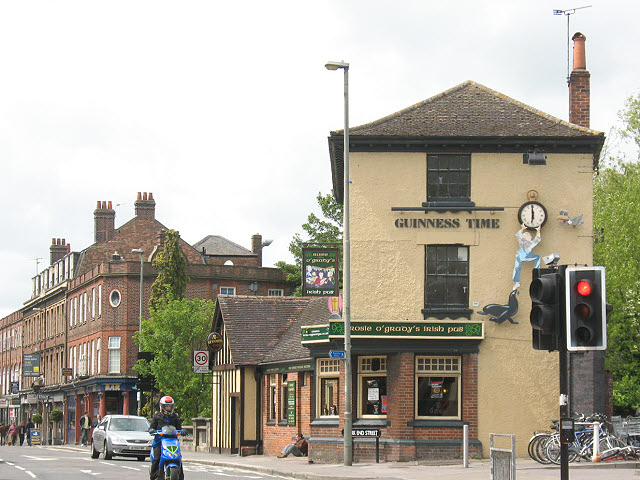
Rosie O'Grady's before it closed in 2009

The pub had been in the Morrells Brewing Company portfolio for most its life, with beer brewed at the nearby Lion Brewery. The decline of the publican industry since the 1990s though, saw not only the Queen's Arms change, but also its brewery. In 1996, responding to the need to move with the times, the Queen's Arms was relaunched as the Irish-themed "Rosie O'Gradys". Patrons of its heyday will reminisce about Irish folk music replete with strings and wind. Further change was afoot two years later in 1998 as Morrells faced a fractious breakup. Lion Brewery was closed and redeveloped as luxury apartments and the various other parts of the enterprise went in different directions. Rosie O'Grady's and the nearby Wychwood Brewery in Witney were a part of the "Refresh" portfolio eventually acquired by Marstons in 2008.

== The Duke's Cut and Marstons ==
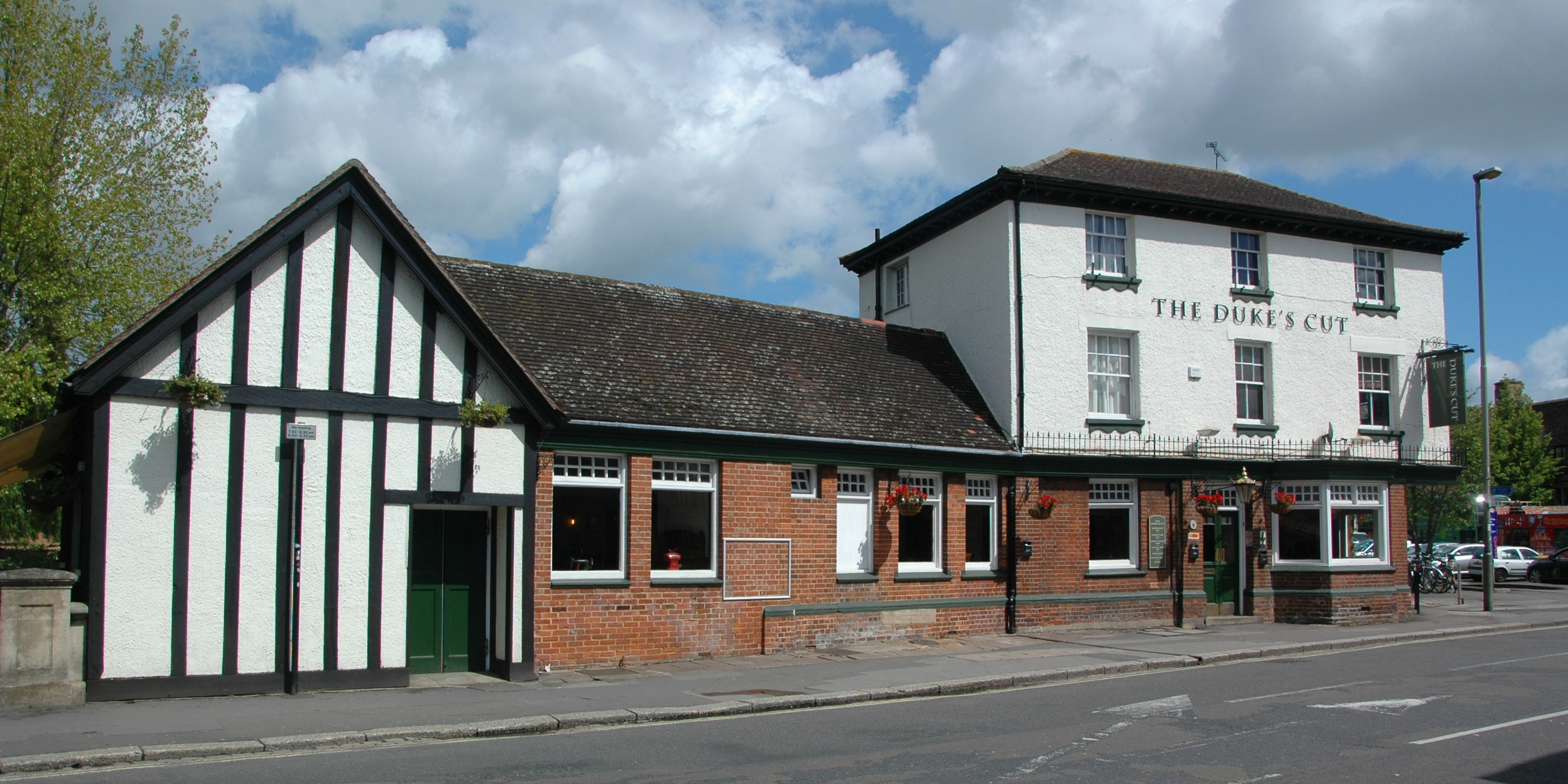
The Duke's Cut in 2014

Recognising the need for change, Marstons recruited experienced publican Mr James Knox to help turn the fortunes of the pub around. He duly delivered a refurbished venue in 2009: "The Duke's Cut" – the name Duke's Cut derived from the Duke of Marlborough's canal construction of 1789 which connected the River Thames to the Oxford canal 3 miles north of the pub. The Duke's Cut was very different from its Irish-themed predecessor with a calmer, more family and food-focused environment.

== The Lighthouse and Novandi ==
In 2013, the Duke's Cut was acquired by Novandi Ltd who reopened it in 2014 as "The Lighthouse"
