= Park End Street =

Street in central Oxford, England

Coordinates: 51°45′10″N 1°15′57″W

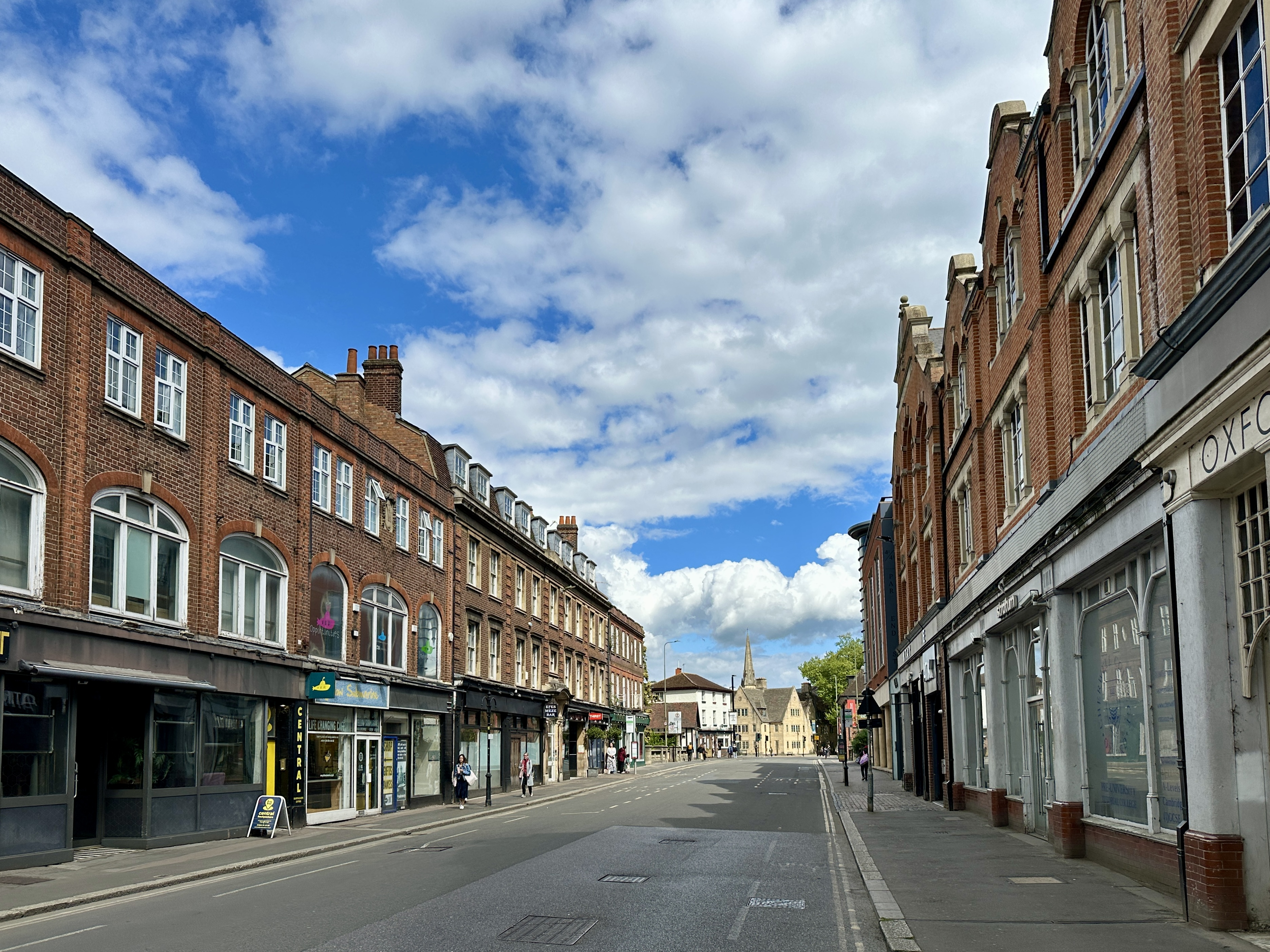
View looking east down Park End Street with Nuffield College and its spire in the distance.

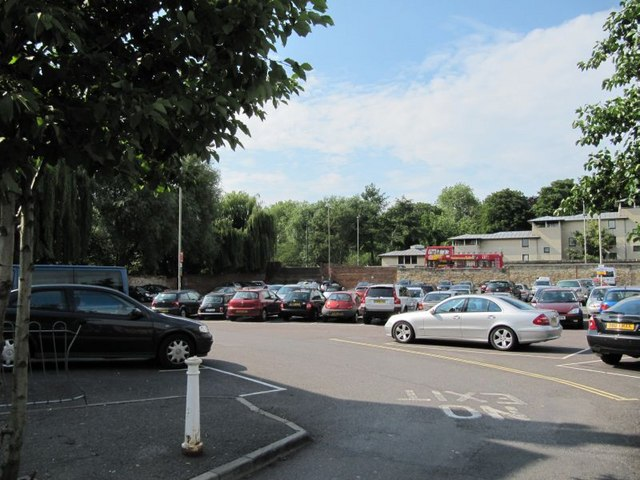
Car park to the north of the eastern end of Park End Street. This area used to be the basin at the end of the Oxford Canal.

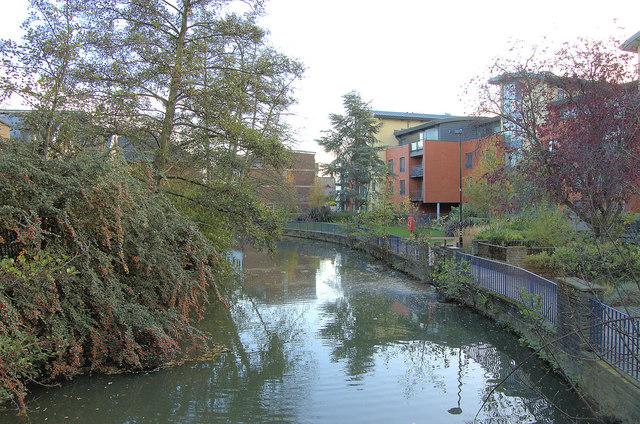
View south from the bridge on Park End Street of the Castle Mill Stream, a branch of the River Thames.

Park End Street is a street in central Oxford, England, to the west of the centre of the city, close to the railway station at its western end.

== Location ==
To the east, New Road links Park End Street to central Oxford. To the west, Frideswide Square links Park End Street with Botley Road, the main arterial road in and out of Oxford to and from the west. Parallel to the street to the north is Hythe Bridge Street. At the junction with New Road, Worcester Street leads north and Tidmarsh Lane leads south. At the junction with Frideswide Square, Rewley Road leads north and Hollybush Row leads south.

== History ==
Park End Street was built in 1769–70 as part of New Road, a new turnpike road between central Oxford and the west. It bypassed the earlier and narrower Hythe Bridge Street to the north and St. Thomas's High Street (now St Thomas' Street) to the south. Pacey's Bridge was built to carry the eastern part of Park End Street across Castle Mill Stream, which is part of the River Thames.

The street's name is derived from a wharf where coal from Parkend in the Forest of Dean was delivered by barge. From the 1840s, railways took an increasing share of coal traffic. Inland waterways' share of the traffic declined and in 1885 Park End Wharf was redeveloped for other purposes (see below).

=== Public house ===
By the early part of the 19th century, a public house had been opened at 1 Park End Street on the north side of the street just east of the bridge. It was named the Queen's Arms, almost certainly after Charlotte of Mecklenburg-Strelitz, Queen Consort of George III. The pub is currently called Lighthouse after being refurbished in 2014.

=== Breweries ===
In 1885 Park End Wharf was redeveloped as the site of the Tower Brewery, which its owner F. Phillips then expanded in the 1890s and 1900s to designs by local architect H.J. Tollit.

Before the Tower Brewery was built, the Eagle Brewery was already on a site next to the wharf. Its owner William Miller renamed it the Eagle Steam Brewery to advertise its conversion to steam powered brewing, and then in 1869 sold it to J.N. Weaving. In 1871 Weaving demolished part of the brewery to build a granary and in 1872 he added a three-storey malthouse. Weaving's successor F. Phillips continued to expand the business, including the addition of a new tower brewhouse, chimney and other buildings in 1885 designed by H.J. Tollit. No buildings of either the Eagle or the Tower breweries now survive.

=== Railway station ===
From 1851 Oxford Rewley Road railway station was on the corner of Park End Street and Rewley Road. British Railways closed the station in 1951 and its goods yard in 1984. The station was dismantled and moved to Buckinghamshire Railway Centre in 1999 to make way for the creation of Frideswide Square and building of Saïd Business School.

=== Warehouse ===
Archer, Cowley & Co's Cantay Depositories furniture warehouse was designed by Tollit and built in 1901. Behind its decorative gabled red brick facade, Cantay Depositories has a steel frame and iron columns cast by William Lucy's Eagle Ironworks in Jericho, Oxford. As a warehouse the building had 3,840 square feet (357 m^{2}) of storage space and was segregated into sections by armoured, fire-proof doors that would close automatically in the event of fire. Cantay House is now Oxford Conference Centre, a nightclub, and a retail store.

=== Marmalade factory ===
From 1903 until after the Second World War Frank Cooper's Oxford Marmalade was made at a factory at 27 Park End Street (now part of Frideswide Square) next to Victoria Buildings. In the sixties and seventies the building was used as offices by various sections of Oxfordshire County Council. The former factory is now a listed building. It housed "The Jam Factory" which was an arts centre, restaurant, and bar, from 2006 to 2022. "The Jam Factory" also housed Guardian Award-winning charity, "My Life My Choice" run by and for people with learning disabilities.

=== Motor trade ===
From the end of the First World War a number of car and motorcycle traders had premises in Park End Street. They included King's Motors and Hartwell's, both of which were founded in Oxford in 1919, and Leyton's, which was taken over by King's but remained a separate subsidiary. By 1930 Howard King had premises in Park End Street with showroom space for 100 motorcycles. In 1934 King's had larger premises built at 15 Park End Street with showroom space for 500 motorcycles. The 1934 showroom is a two-storey Art Deco building whose facade is of yellow Bath Stone ashlar to match the Royal Oxford Hotel next door. The bespoke etched glass panels depicting 30's motoring scenes which were above Kings main showroom windows were saved and are now on display in Bealieu Motor Museum. H.F. Temple was another motorcycle dealer in the 1940s/50s; their premises were situated at 46 Park End Street and also 69 High Street, St Thomas, Oxford. Temples was the main Oxford supplier for the BSA C11G and C12 and is listed in the 1956 BSA C12 Owners handbook as being the only BSA dealer in the city*. (*Source from the 1956 BSA C12 Owners handbook, listing all addresses/suppliers in the UK at this time). Eyles and Coxeter was another motor dealer in Park End Street in the sixties, they were sited alongside Lower Fisher Row, currently the site of Sushimania, their workshops stretched way down alongside Lower Fisher Row, in the showroom alongside, catering for the 'county' set, they sold Rover, Jaguar, Land Rover and Rice horse boxes. All but one of the motor traders have now moved to premises further from central Oxford. Hartwell's former premises was a branch of Office Outlet before it closed, formerly Staples Inc. Only King's former premises remained in the motor trade: it was a branch of Kwik-Fit though that has also now closed.

== Sources ==
- Anonymous (1952), King's Motors, Always at your Service, Oxford: King's Motors, pp. 1, 2
- Anstis, Ralph (1998) [1982]. "Chapter 8". The Story of Parkend a Forest of Dean Village. Witney: Lightmoor Press. p. not cited. ISBN 1-899889-02-7.
- Read, Jan; Manjon, Maite (1981). The Great British Breakfast. London: Michael Joseph. p. 94. ISBN 0-7181-2004-3.
- Rhodes, John; Munby, Julian (2008). Castle, Canal & College: Worcester Street Car Park & related areas, Oxford. Oxford: Oxford Preservation Trust. p. 10.
- Woolley, Liz (2010). "Industrial Architecture in Oxford, 1870 to 1914". Oxoniensia. LXXV. Oxfordshire Architectural and Historical Society: 67–96. ISSN 0308-5562.

Next crossing upstream	Castle Mill Stream	Next crossing downstream
Hythe Bridge	Park End Street; Grid reference SP508063	Quaking Bridge
