= Sheepwash Channel =

Backwater in Oxford, England

Coordinates: 51.755586°N 1.270946°W

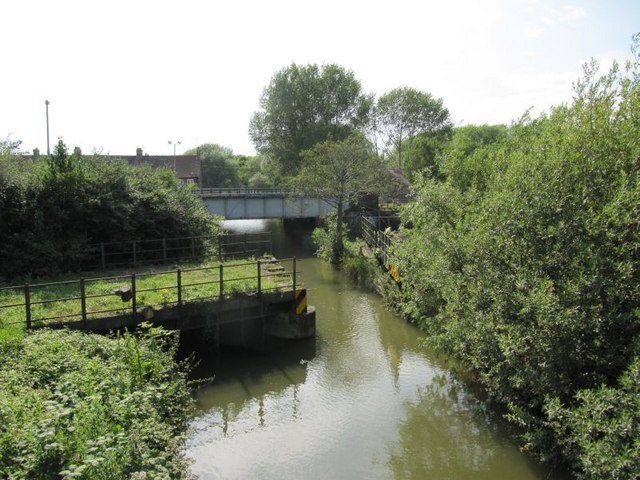
View of Sheepwash Channel, with the site of the old Rewley Road Swing Bridge in the foreground and the newer Sheepwash Channel Railway Bridge in the background.

Sheepwash Channel connects the River Thames to the west and the Castle Mill Stream next to the Oxford Canal to the east (linked through Isis Lock), in west Oxford, England. To the north are Cripley Meadow (largely allotments) and Fiddler's Island. To the south are Osney Island and the Botley Road.

The Cherwell Valley Line and Cotswold Line cross the channel just north of Oxford railway station on Sheepwash Channel Railway Bridge. Just to the east, there is Rewley Road Swing Bridge, a swing bridge for the former Buckinghamshire Railway line of London and North Western Railway, that used to serve the Oxford Rewley Road railway station, which was on the site of the Saïd Business School. Rewley Road Bridge also crosses Sheepwash Channel.

The Isis Lock just to the north of the eastern end of Sheepwash Channel connects the Castle Mill Stream and the Oxford Canal, allowing access between the Oxford Canal and the River Thames via the channel for boats. At the western end is a footbridge over Sheepwash Channel, forming part of the Thames Path.

== Gallery ==
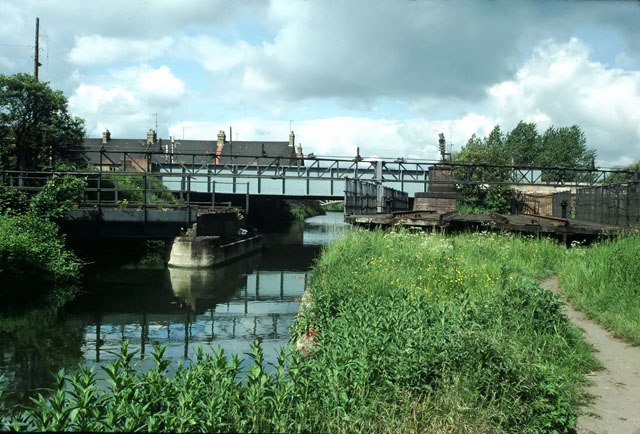
The Sheepwash Channel with the old swing bridge and the newer railway bridge.

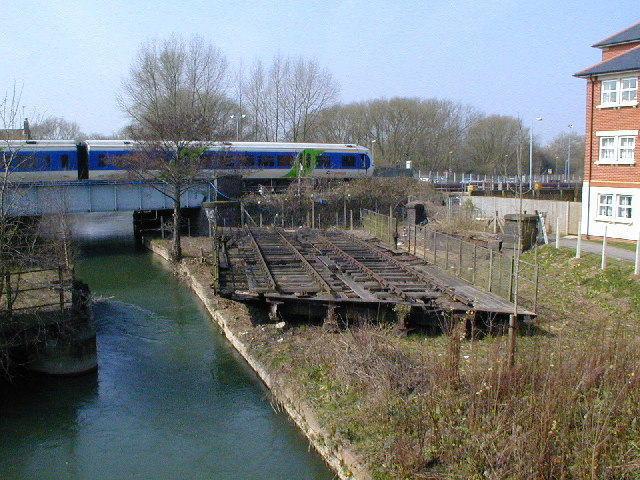
The old swing bridge and the newer railway bridge over the Sheepwash Channel.

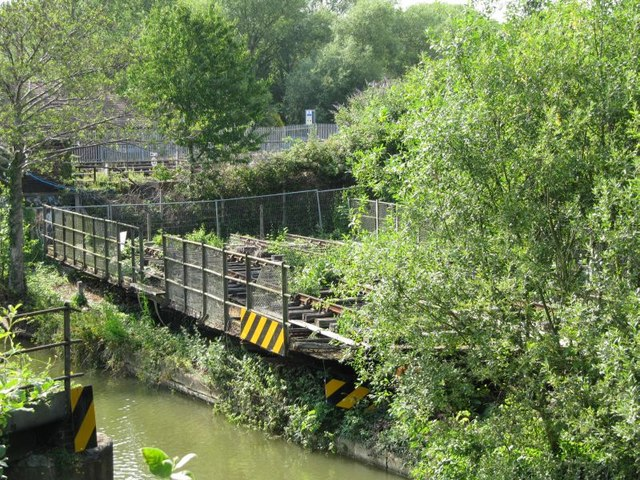
The swing bridge in the open position on the north bank of the Sheepwash Channel.

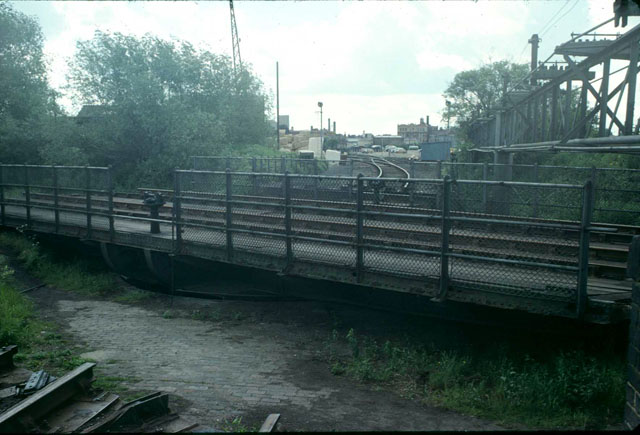
View of the swing bridge over Sheepwash Channel in 1977 when it was still in operation.

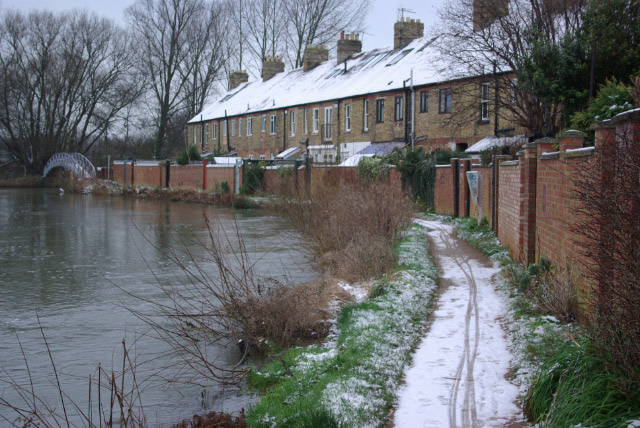
The River Thames just south of the western entrance to the Sheepwash Channel (under the arched footbridge).

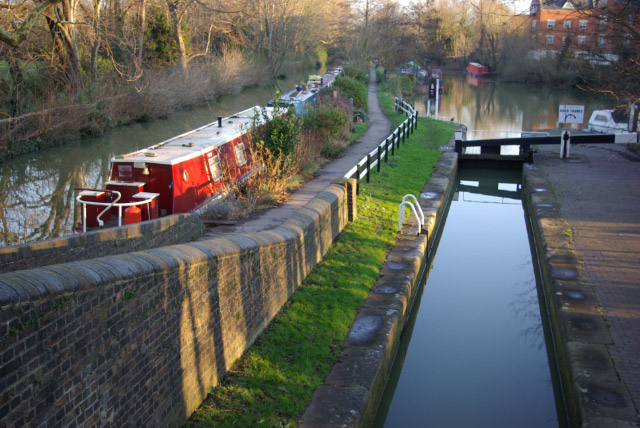
The Isis Lock that connects the Oxford Canal with Sheepwash Channel via a short stretch of the Castle Mill Stream.

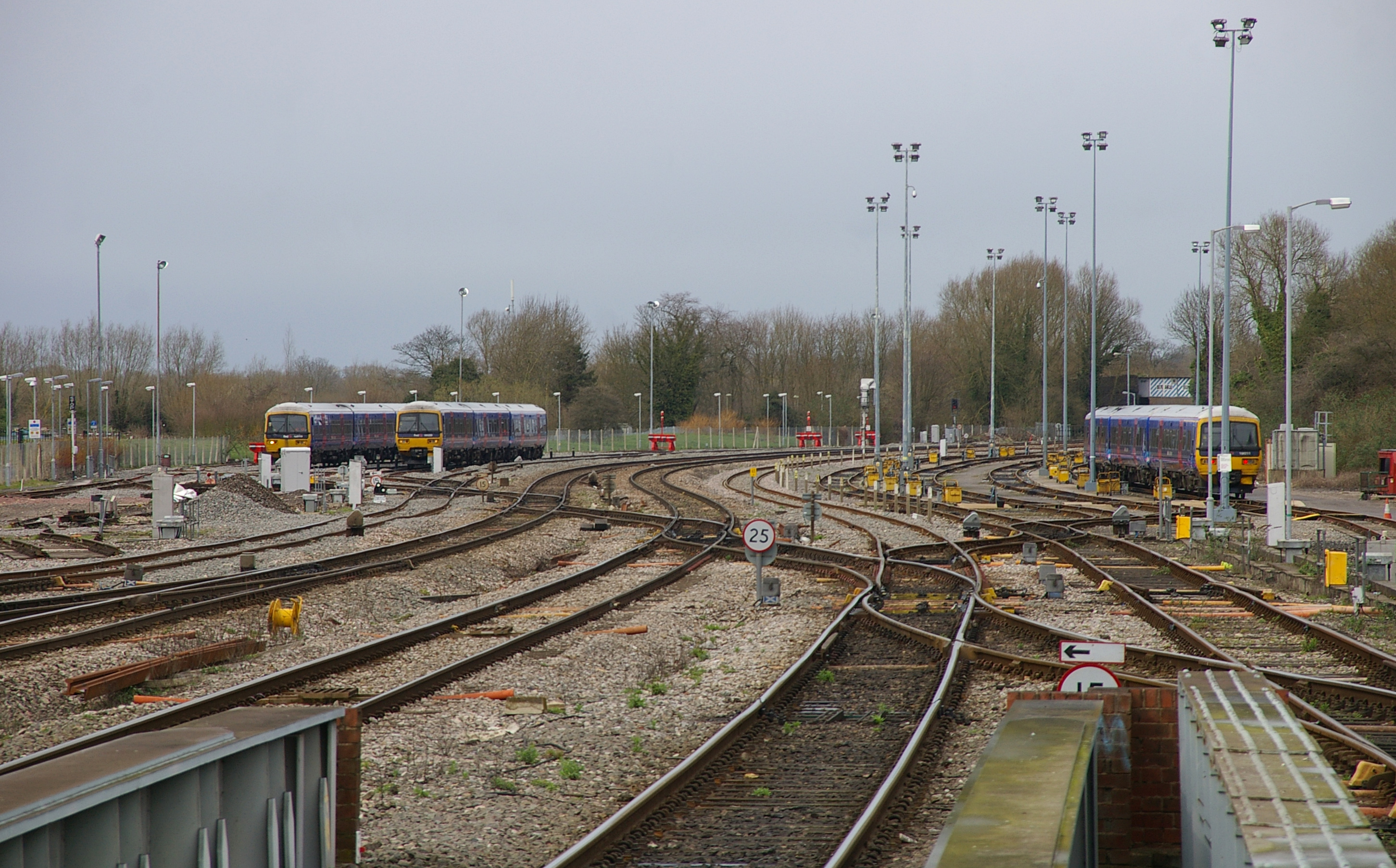
Looking north along the railway line from Oxford railway station over Sheepwash Channel Railway Bridge.
