= Frideswide Square =

Square in Oxford, England

Coordinates: 51.7528°N 1.2680°W

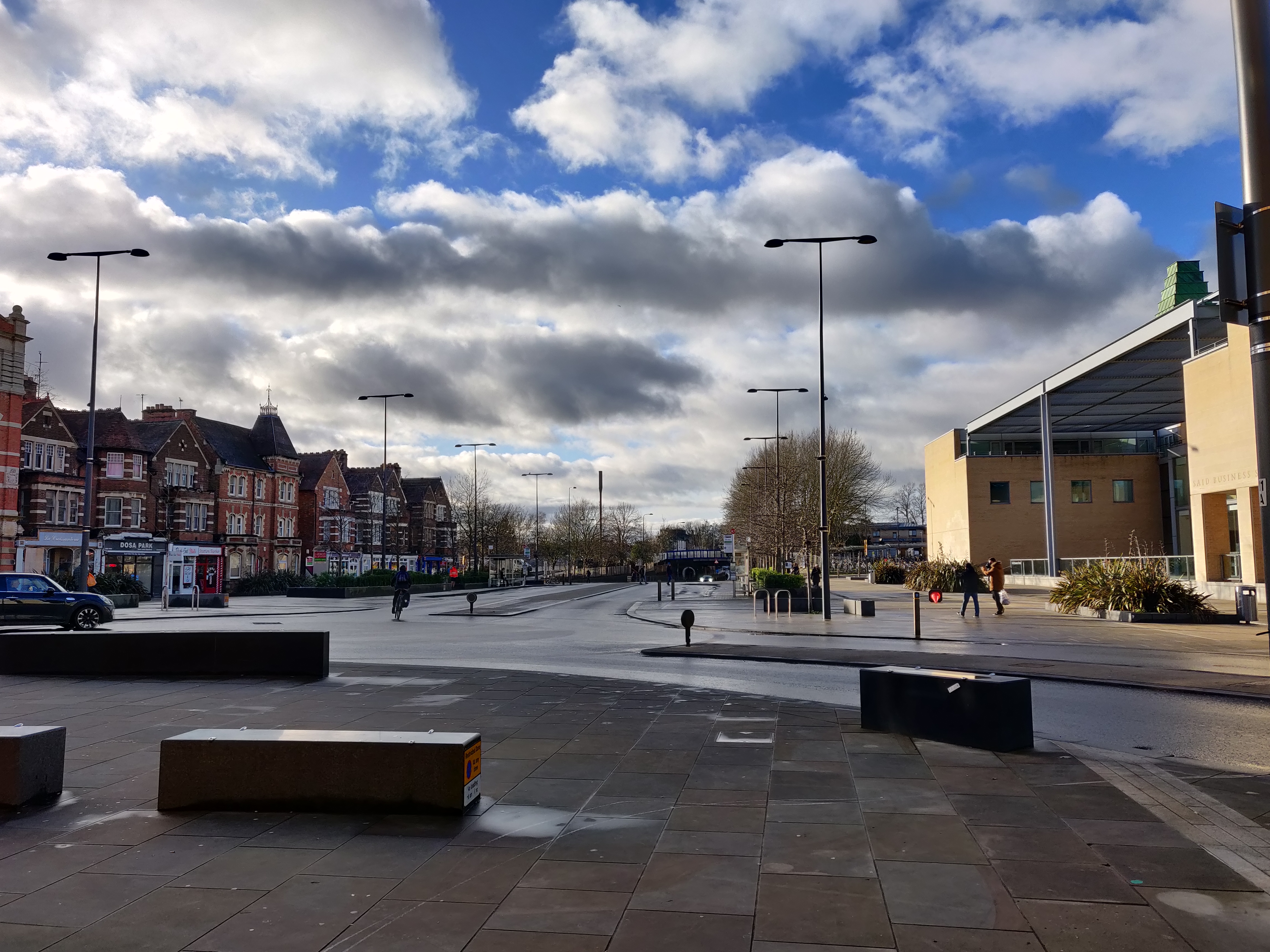
Looking southwest over Frideswide Square

Frideswide Square is a square to the west of central Oxford, England. The square is named after the patron saint of Oxford, St Frideswide. The name was chosen in a public vote in 2002, the area having previously been considered an extension of Park End Street and informally known as 'Station Junction' because it passes Oxford railway station.

The "square" is actually more of a tapered rectangle in shape. Immediately to the north, the modern Saïd Business School of Oxford University dominates the square, established in 1996 on the site of the former Oxford Rewley Road railway station. To the east are Hythe Bridge Street (A4144) and Park End Street, both leading into central Oxford. Between them is the Royal Oxford Hotel. To the south, Hollybush Row and then Oxpens Road (A4144 road) act as an inner ring road leading to Abingdon Road, the main arterial road south out of the city. On the corner with Hollybush Row is the old Frank Cooper's jam factory, now used as office space for Nuffield College and a restaurant. To the west, Botley Road (A420 road) leads out of the city centre, under a railway bridge just south of the main Oxford railway station, situated to the northwest.

The square is a major traffic hub in Oxford and is often a bottleneck to traffic flow. Many buses stop in the square.

In 2015, work began to transform the square from a congested area to a more attractive public space. The main phase of construction works started in February 2015 and continued until December 2015. The new design removes traffic lights from the square and makes use of shared spaces.

== Gallery ==
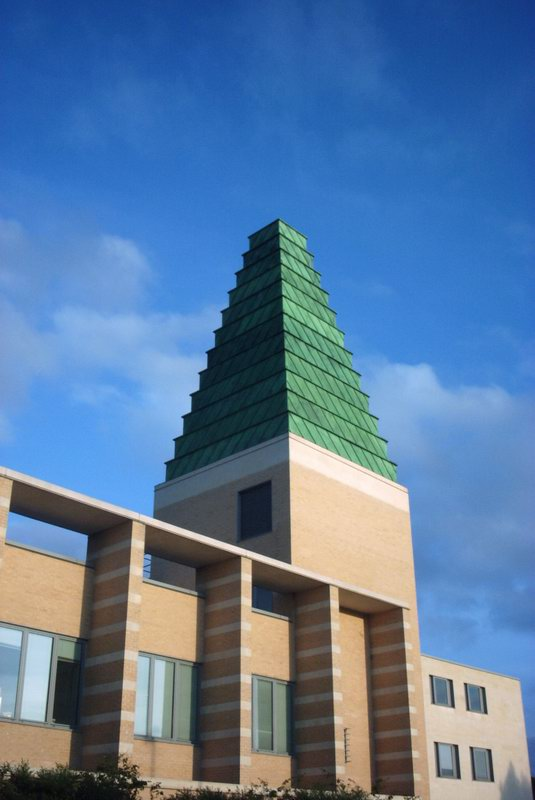
The spire of the Saïd Business School, north of Frideswide Square.

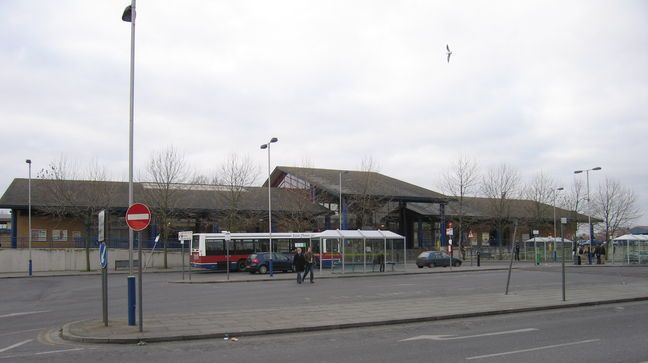
The front of the main Oxford railway station, northwest of Frideswide Square.

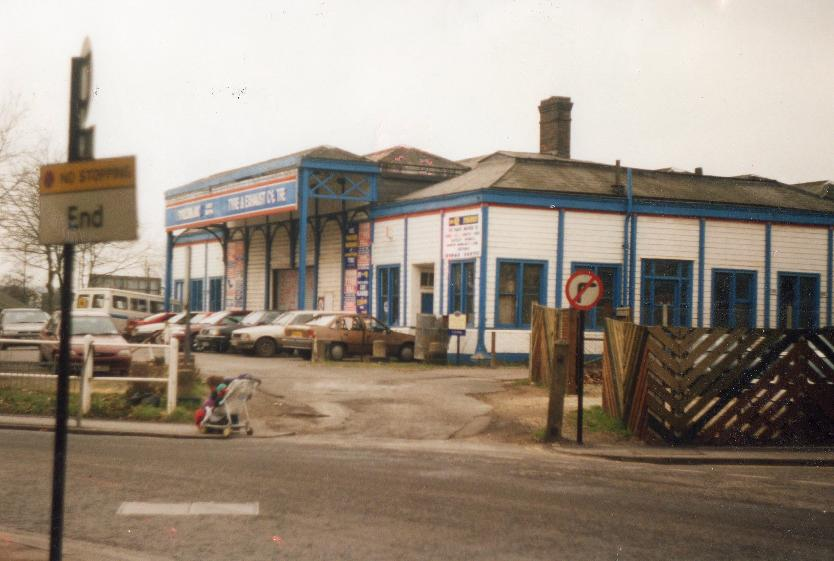
The Oxford Rewley Road railway station in 1994, north of the current Frideswide Square on the site of the Saïd Business School.

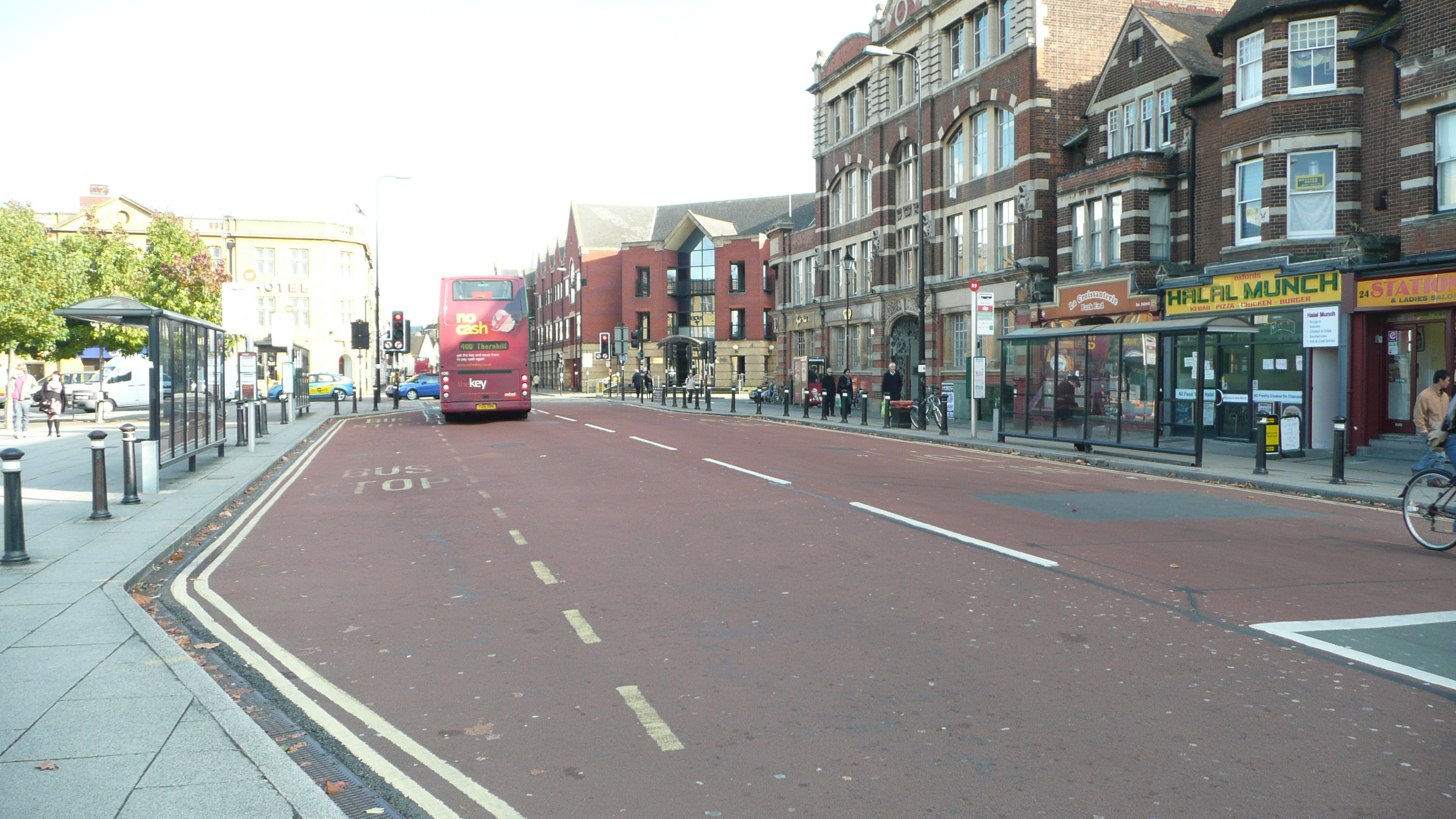
The south side of Frideswide Square looking east before the 2015 redevelopment.
