= Rewley Abbey =

Abbey in Oxford, England

Coordinates: 51°45′15″N 1°16′04″W

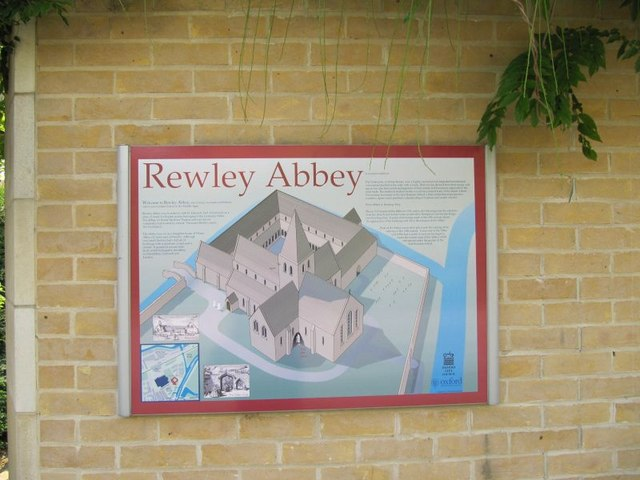
An artist's impression of Rewley Abbey.

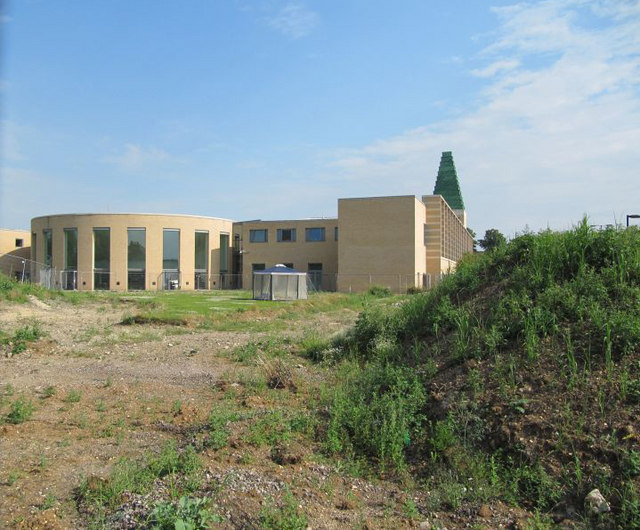
The approximate location of Rewley Abbey at the back of the Said Business School.

The Cistercian Abbey of Rewley was an abbey in Oxford, England. It was founded in the 13th century by Edmund, 2nd Earl of Cornwall. Edmund's father, Richard, 1st Earl of Cornwall, founder of Hailes Abbey, had intended to establish a college or chantry of three secular priests to pray for his soul, but his son Edmund substituted 'six Cistercian monks, having more confidence in them'. If this was the original plan, it was soon enlarged. In 1280 he offered the general chapter of the Cistercian order to found a college (studium) for Cistercians at Oxford, and the chapter accepted the offer, and decreed that the college should have the same privileges as the college of St. Bernard at Paris, and that it should be under the Abbot of Thame, as the other was under the Abbot of Clairvaux. The following year the chapter decreed 'out of due respect to the Earl of Cornwall' that the Abbot of Thame should be empowered to appoint an Abbot of his own choice for the house of study at Oxford, and that there should be a daily memory of the late Earl of Cornwall at Mass at the college (studium) of Oxford, according as the Abbot of the place shall ordain.

== Land ==
The Abbey obtained from its founder the Manor of Yarnton, mills in Cassington, the hamlet of Wyllanston in the parish of Mixbury, two parks in Nettlebed called Great and Little Hymer (now Highmore), tenements in London, and the advowson of the church of St. Wendron in Cornwall (now called Wendron). Of this church the Abbey had the appropriation as early as 1324. Subsequently, Edward the Black Prince gave the advowson of St. Stithians, Cornwall, and in 1354, the Bishop granted them the appropriation. Before 1291 the Abbey also had possessions in Chesterton, Oxfordshire, doubtless given by the founder, who owned that manor. The Valor shows that by 1535 it had rents in Coventry, but had acquired little beyond its original endowments. Lands in Arwothell, in Cornwall, are mentioned in 1396, when the abbot, (Abbas de Regali Loco iuxta Oxon), was accusing men of taking goods in Arwothell.

== Inmates ==
The number of inmates, which at first was fifteen, by the year 1294 was raised to sixteen. In 1292 an order was issued by the Abbot of Cîteaux that the Cistercian houses in the province of Canterbury should send students to the 'studium Oxonie,' one from every monastery with twenty monks.

How long Rewley remained a place of study is not certain. The fact that there was a dispute in 1300 as to what precedence the monks of Rewley should have in university processions shows that the monks were students then, and an entry in the Patent Rolls for 1315 concerning damage done at Rewley contains the words 'the monks residing there are scholars.'

John is named as abbot "Loco Regali", in 1401.

Probably it ceased to be a place of study when Bernard College was built, and King Henry VIII, patron of the Abbey, seems to have ordered that a grammar master should be kept at Rewley, and that one or two of the monks should be supported at Bernard College.

== The Dissolution ==
Rewley Abbey was a victim of the Dissolution of the Monasteries in 1539. Abbot Nicholaus Austen, early in 1536, offered Thomas Cromwell £100 to save the monastery if only by converting it into a college, (fn. 20) but it was useless, and Abbot Nicholas was pensioned off and retired to Trinity Hall, Cambridge, to study. There is a Catholic Priest who has the title of Abbot of Rewley Abbey.

== Traces of the abbey ==
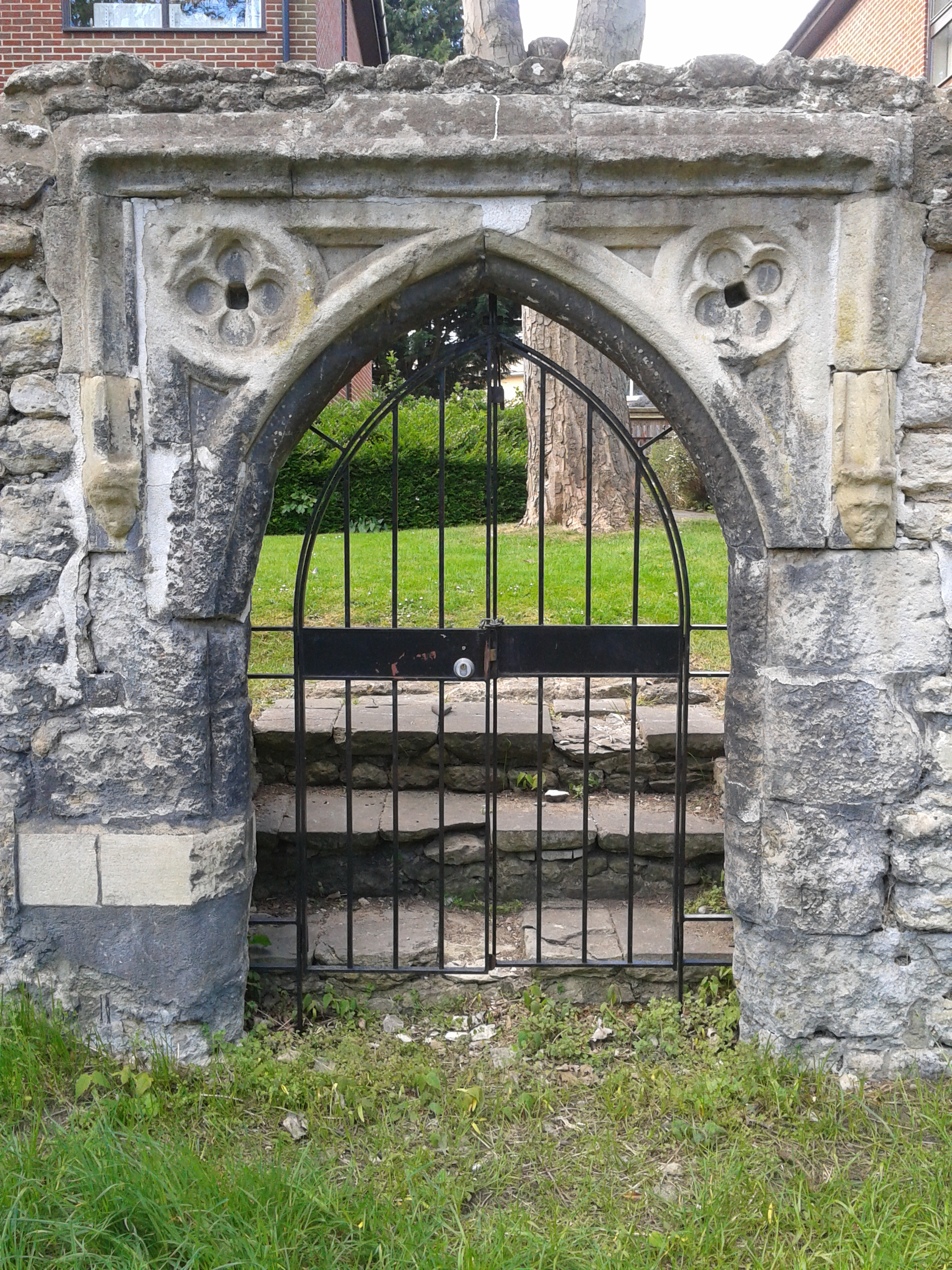
The only remaining gate of the Abbey, along the Oxford Mill Stream

Stones from Rewley Abbey were used to strengthen the base of the tower of St Mary Magdalen's Church, Oxford. Oxford Rewley Road railway station was built on the site of the Abbey in 1851, but the site ceased to be in railway use in 1984. The only remaining trace of the Abbey is the remains of a wall and gate alongside the Castle Mill Stream near the terminus of the Oxford Canal, which for many years marked the perimeter of the rail yard at Oxford railway station. An estate of houses now occupies the land on which Rewley Abbey stood.

== See also ==
- Osney Abbey
- Rewley House
- Rewley Road
