= Fiddler's Island =

Island in the River Thames in Oxford, England

Coordinates: 51.7635°N 1.2799°W

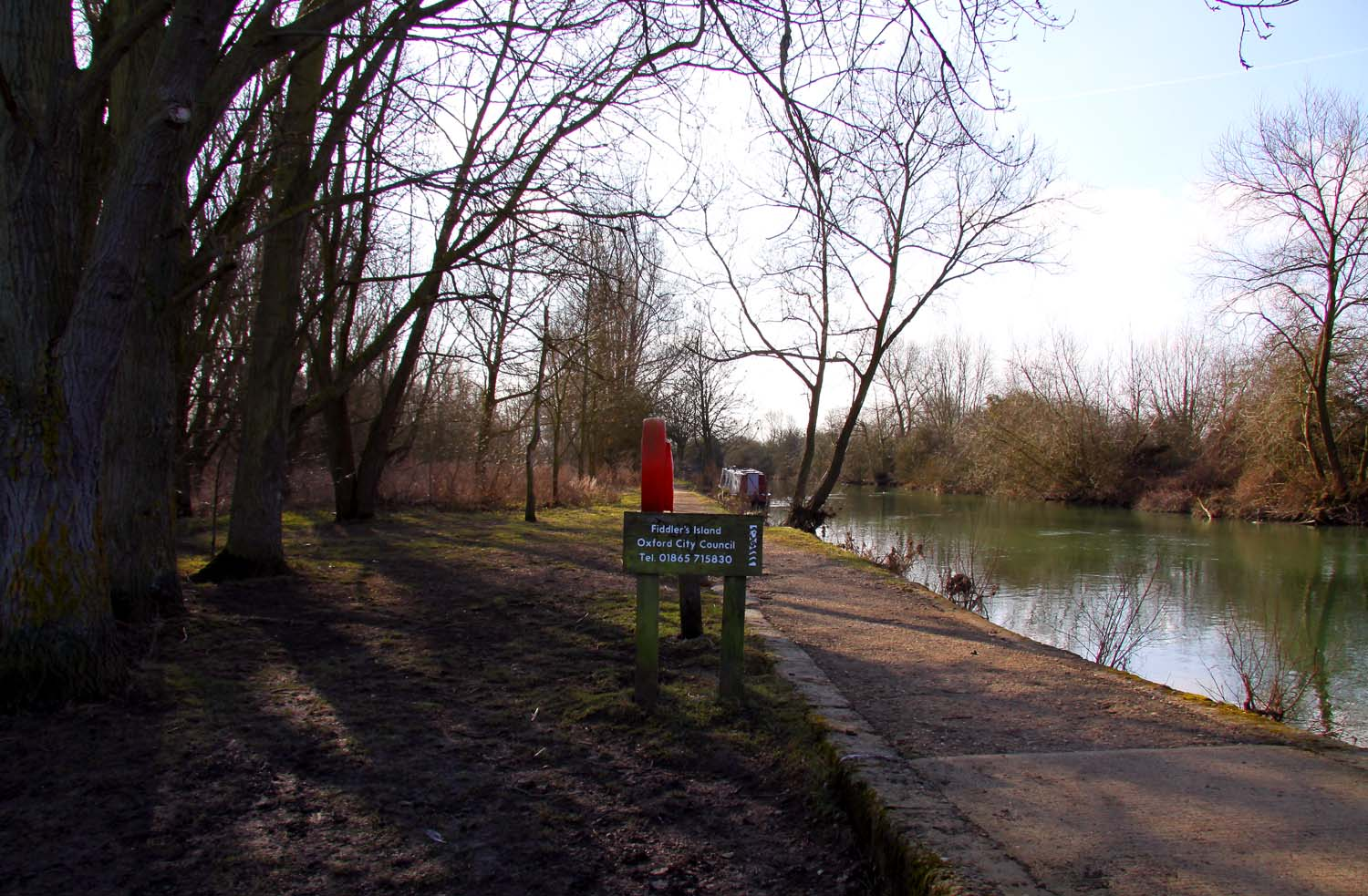
The Thames Path on Fiddler's Island

Fiddler's Island is an island in the River Thames at Oxford in England. It is situated south of Port Meadow on the reach above Osney Lock.

The north part of the island sits between the River Thames and the top end of Castle Mill Stream, a Thames backwater. Fiddler's Island Stream flows to the east of the southern part of the island. To the south of the island, there is a short stretch of water known as the Sheepwash Channel linking back to the Castle Mill Stream and the Oxford Canal. The Thames Path runs the length of the complete island. At the northern end, the island has a row of trees along it. On the Castle Mill Stream side there is extensive mooring. The rainbow-shaped Medley Footbridge crosses the main stream of the Thames to the west at the northern end and a flat iron Bailey bridge crosses Castle Mill Stream further south, linking it to Port Meadow to the east. A small footbridge takes the Thames Path along the bank towards Osney Bridge. The northern part of Fiddler's Island is very thin. The southern part, connected by a footbridge, is wider. To the east is Cripley Meadow, largely consisting of allotments.

Fiddler's Island was authorised for public bathing by the Oxford City Council in 1852, probably the first place in Oxford to be approved by the council.

== Gallery ==
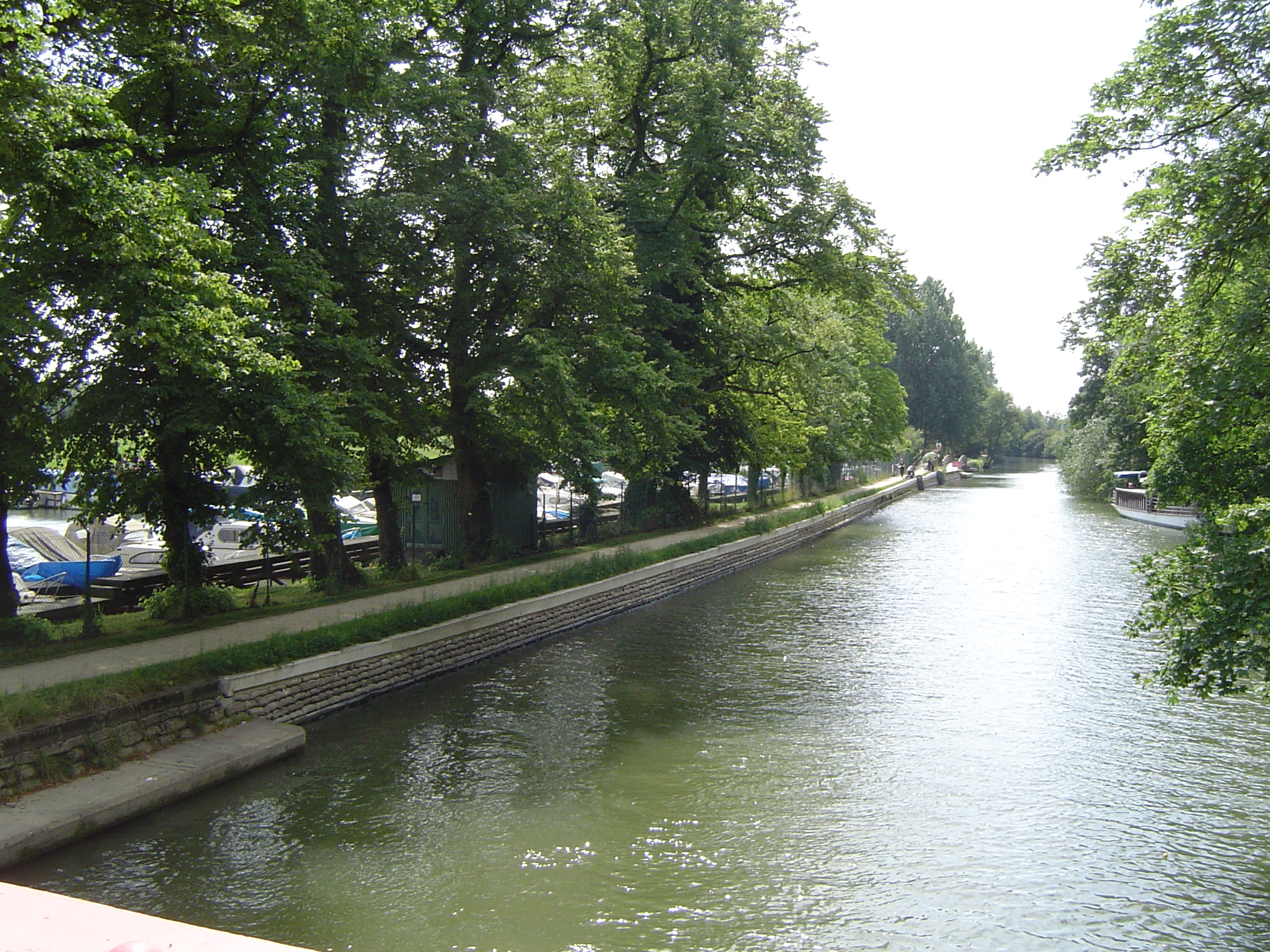
The northern part of Fiddler's Island looking downstream from Medley Footbridge

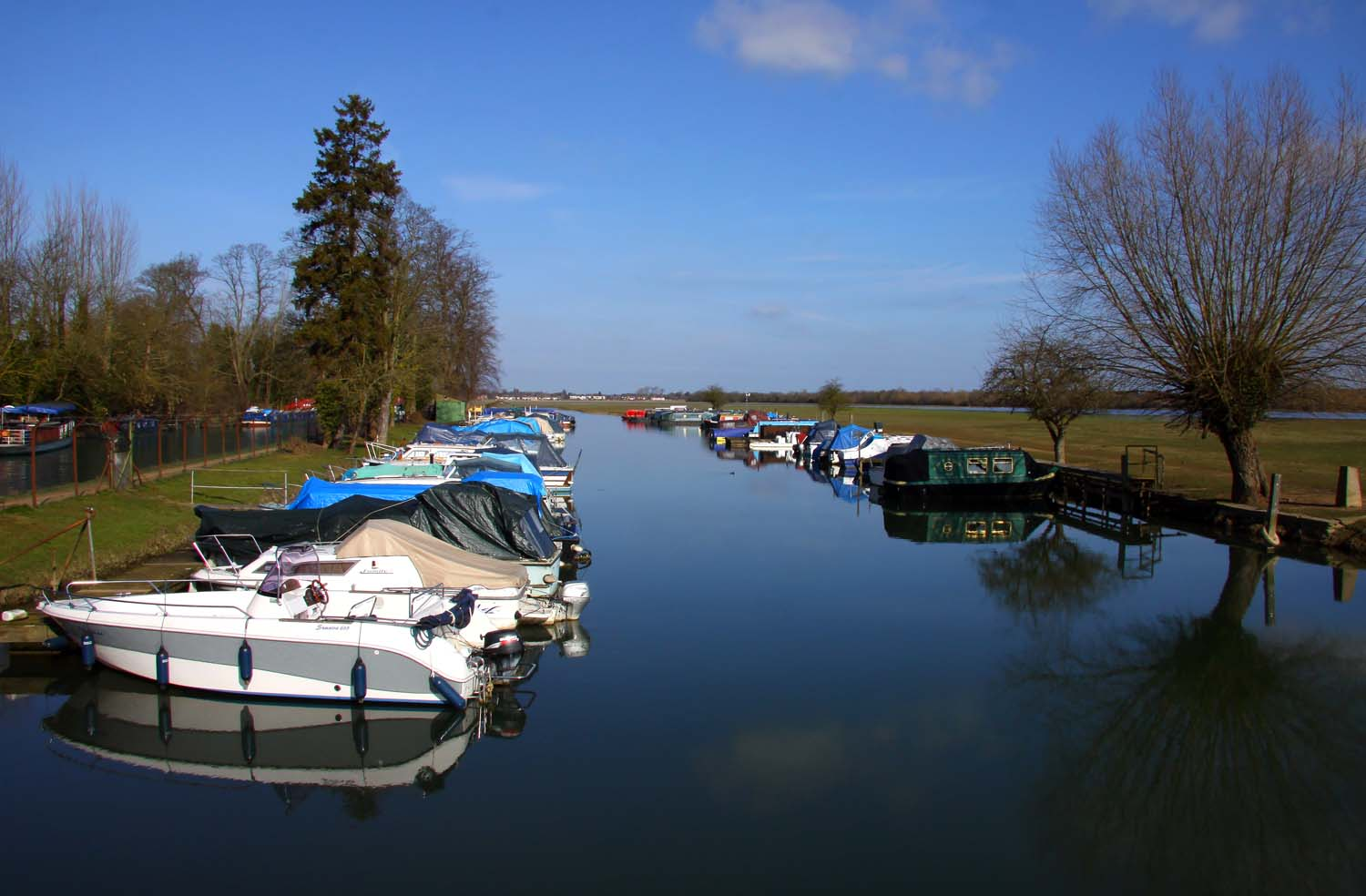
Moorings on Fiddler's Island in the Castle Mill Stream

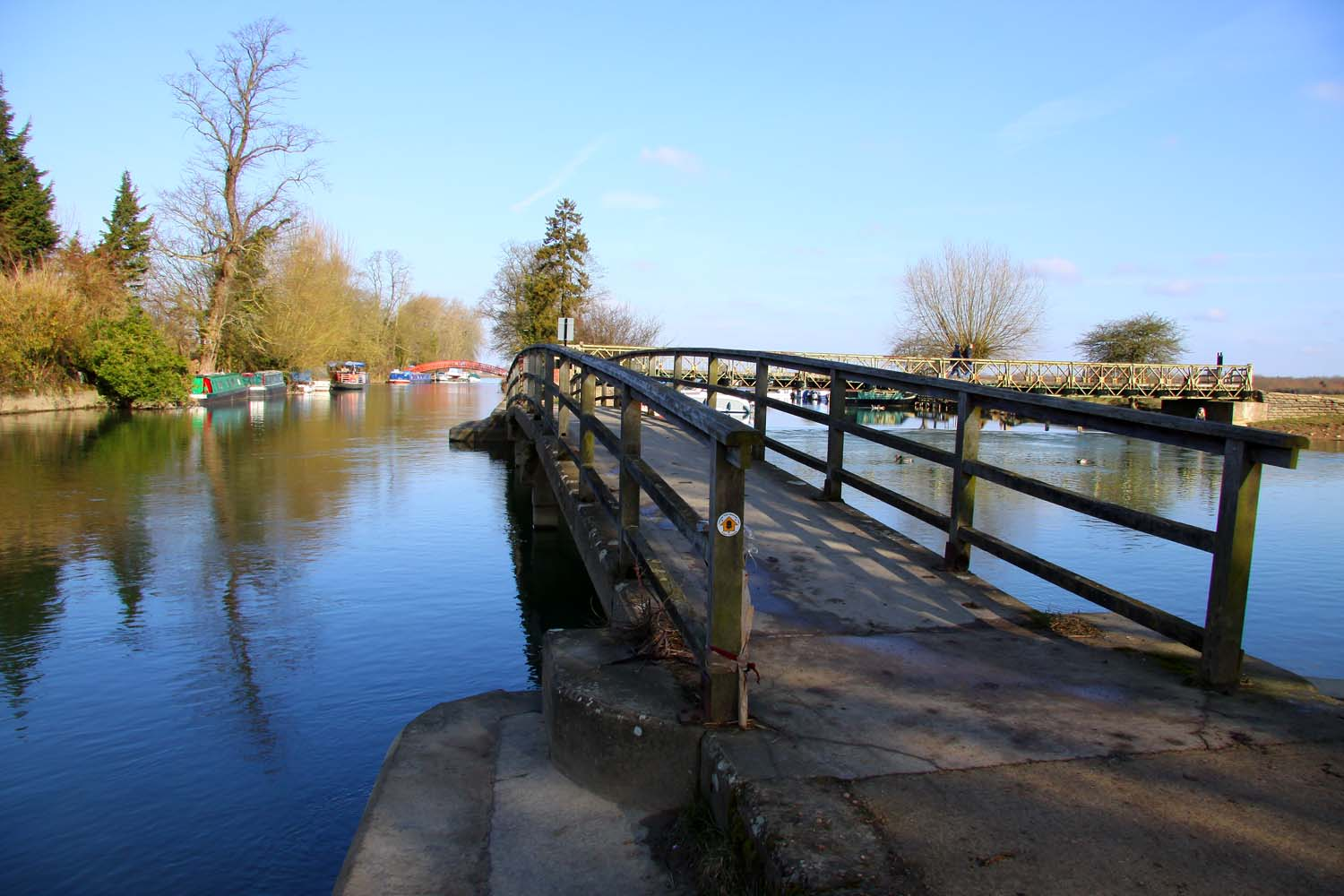
The Thames Path footbridge on Fiddler's Island, looking north

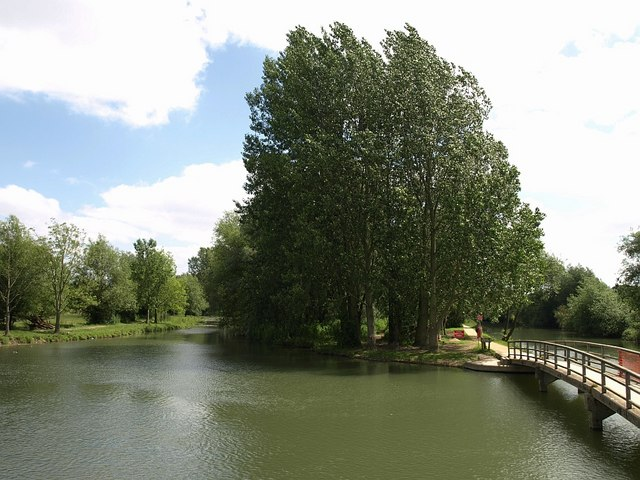
Looking south across the Thames Path footbridge

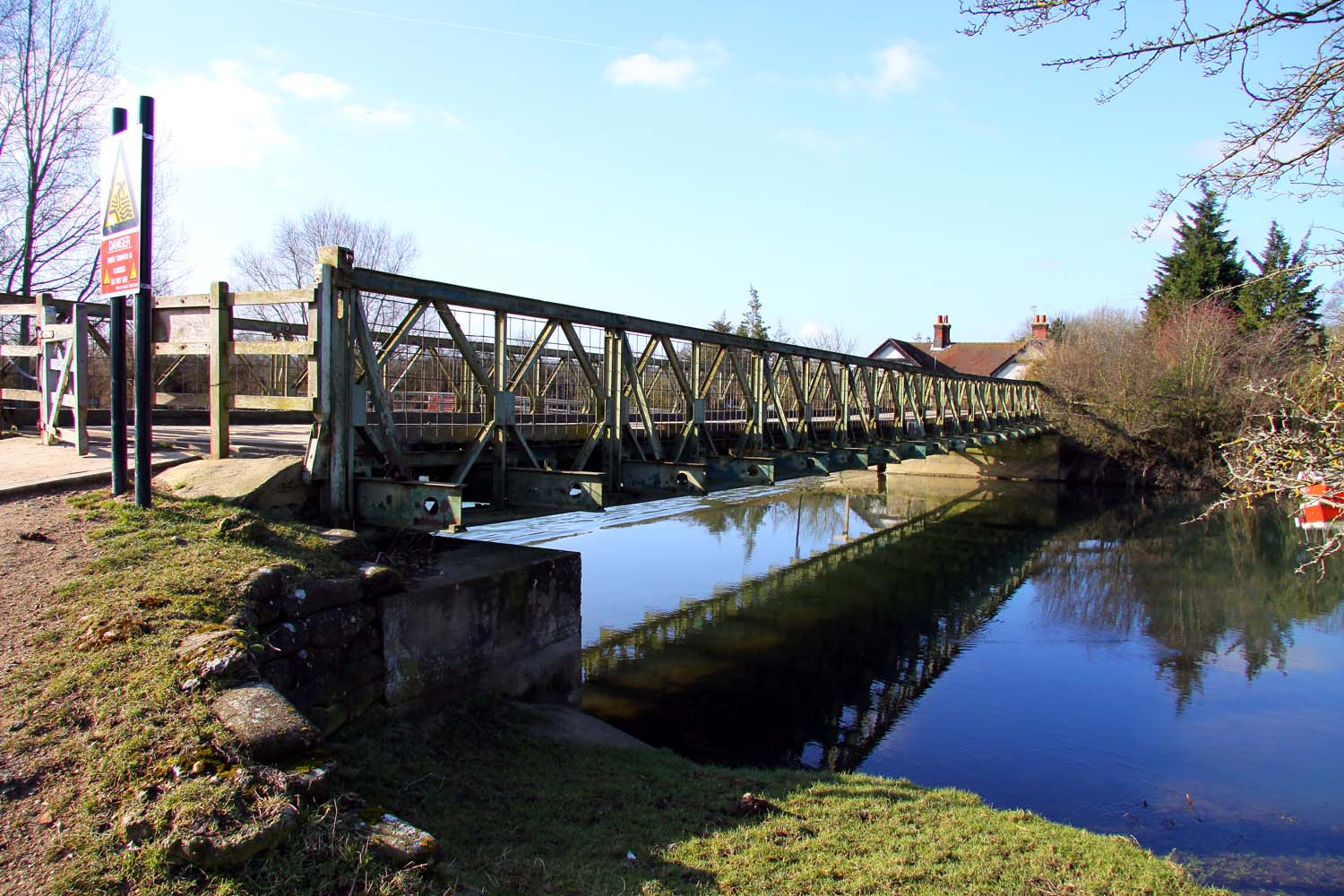
Bailey bridge from Port Meadow to Fiddler's Island

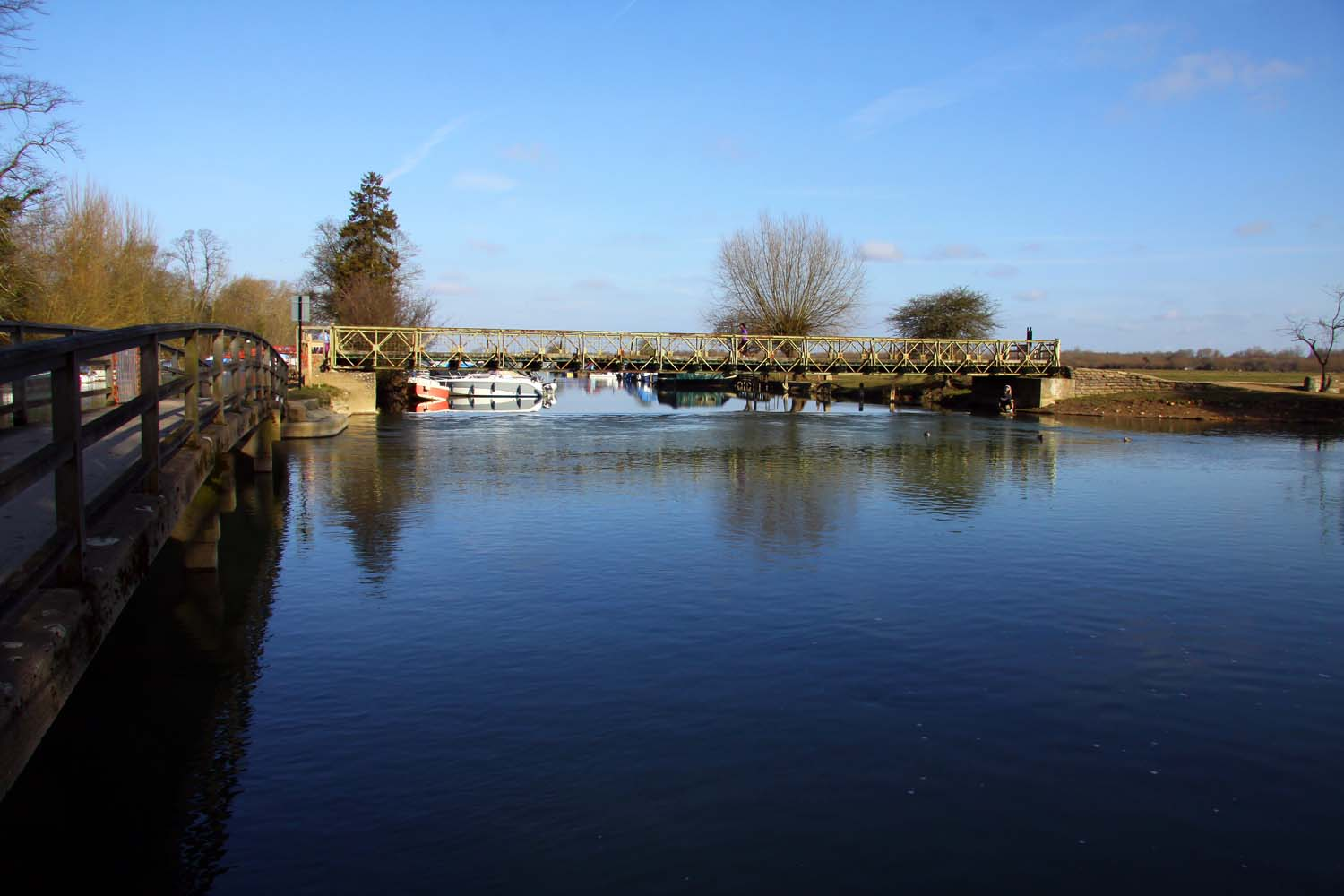
View looking north of the two footbridges at the northern end of Fiddler's Island, with Port Meadow on the right

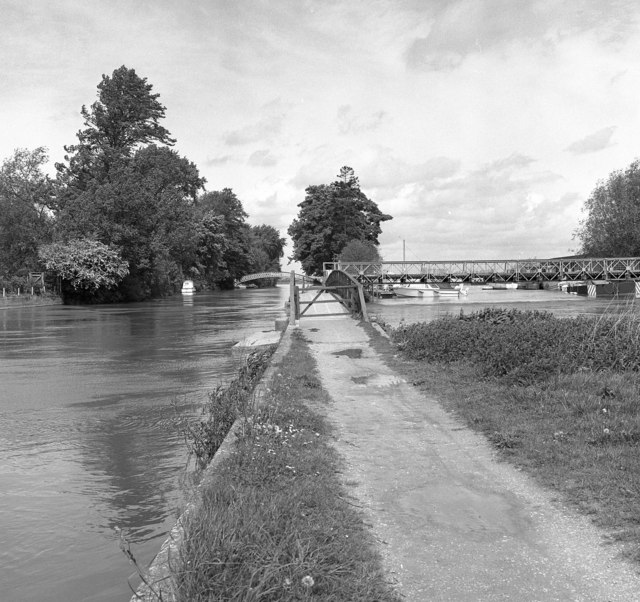
View of the two footbridges with Medley Footbridge in the background in 1979

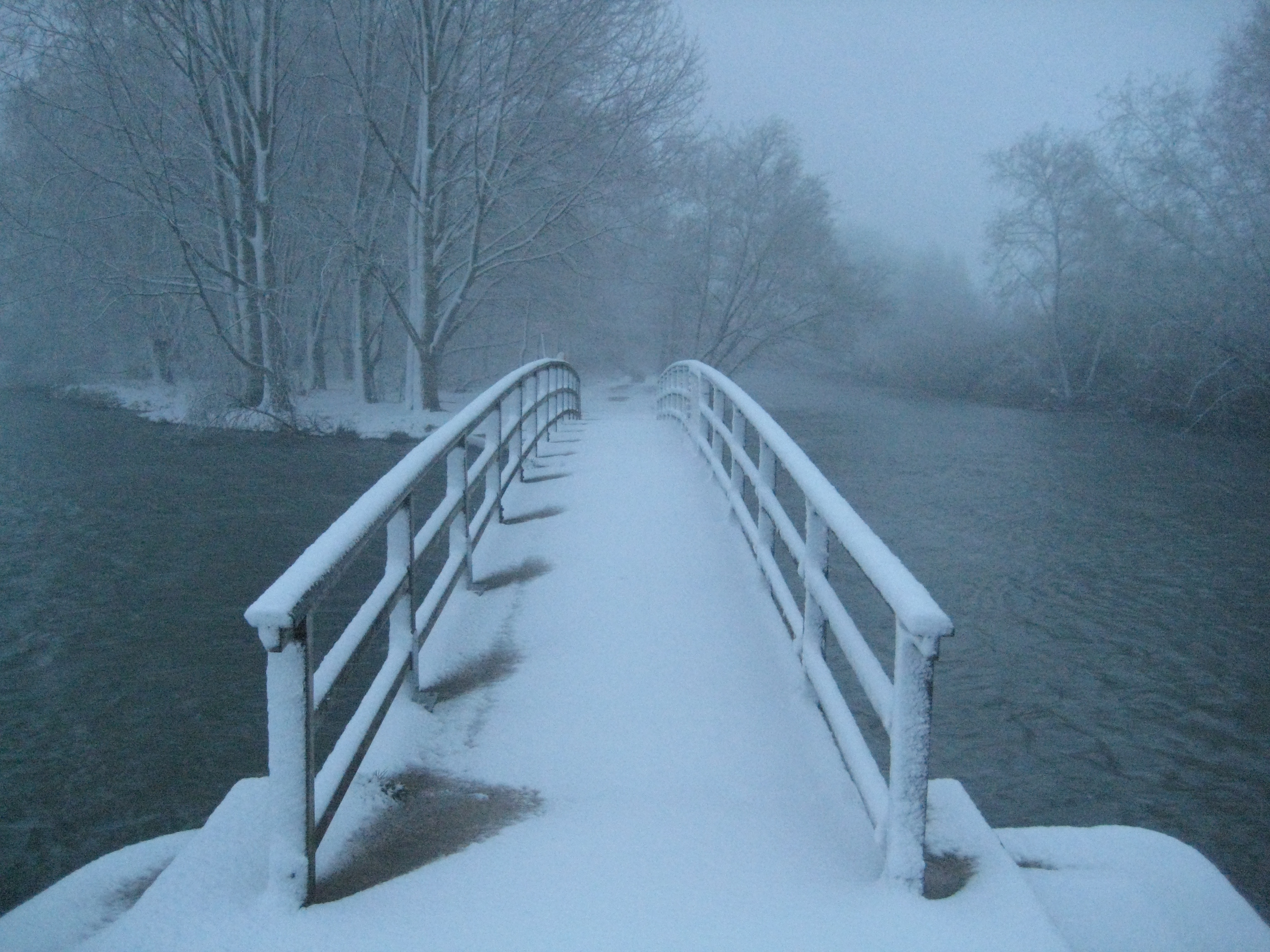
Thames path footbridge on Fiddler's Island during early morning snow, April 2008

== See also ==
- Islands in the River Thames

Next island upstream	River Thames	Next island downstream
-	Fiddler's Island	Osney Island
