= Oxford Rewley Road railway station =

Former railway station in England

Oxford Rewley Road
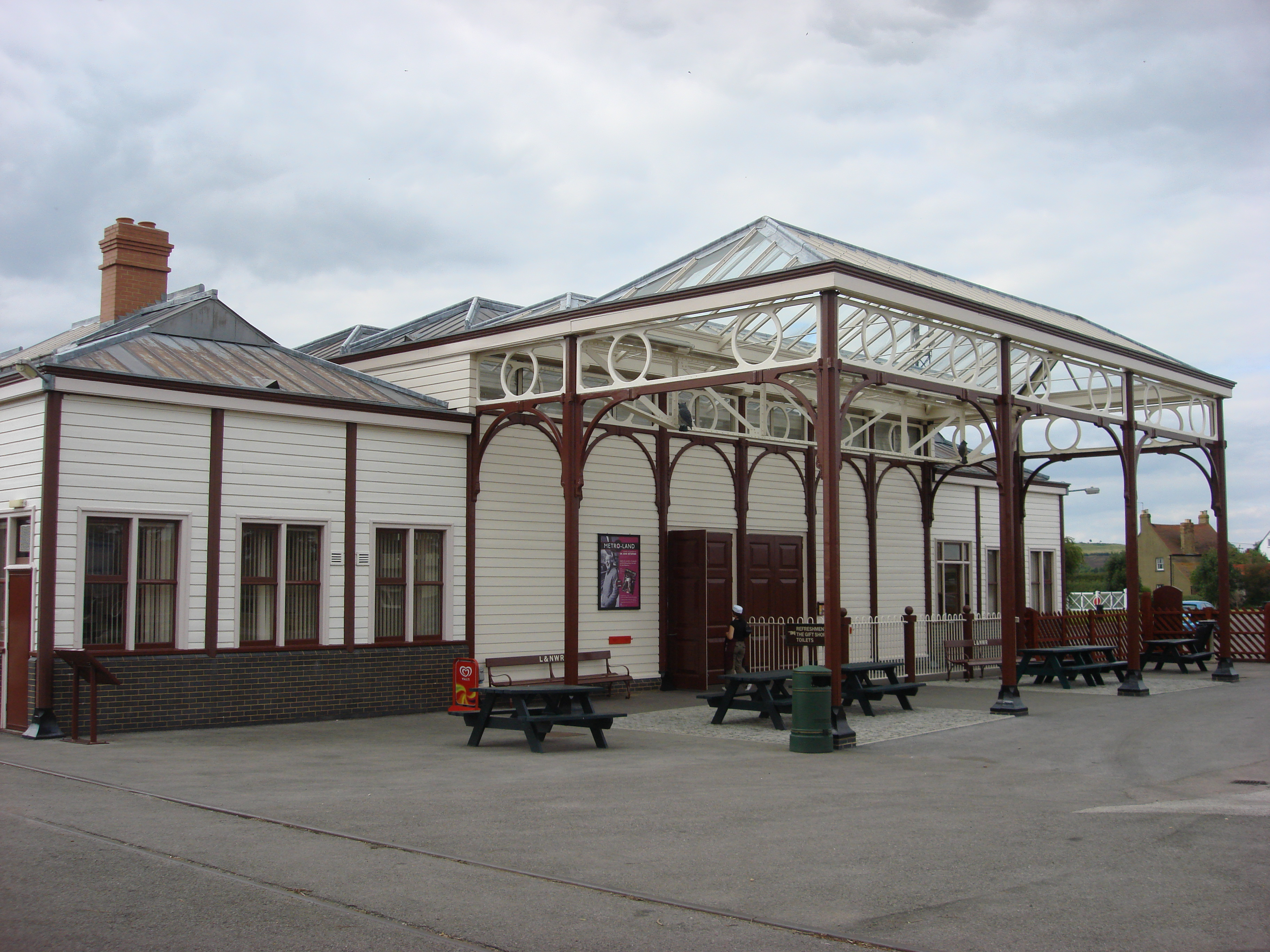
- Relocated Rewley Road station building

General information
- Location: Oxford, City of Oxford; England
- Coordinates: 51.75312°N 1.26983°W
- Grid reference: SP505063
- Platforms: 2

Other information
- Status: Disused

History
- Original company: Buckinghamshire Railway
- Pre-grouping: London and North Western Railway
- Post-grouping: London, Midland and Scottish Railway

Key dates
- 20 May 1851: Opened
- 1 October 1951: Closed
Location

Oxford Rewley Road railway station was a railway station serving the city of Oxford, England, located immediately to the north of what is now Frideswide Square on the site of the Saïd Business School, to the west of Rewley Road. It had features of significance in construction history, and was the terminus of the Buckinghamshire Railway, which was worked, and later absorbed, by the London and North Western Railway (L&NWR). In 1923, it became part of the London, Midland and Scottish Railway (LMS) "Varsity Line" service from Cambridge via Bletchley.

== History ==
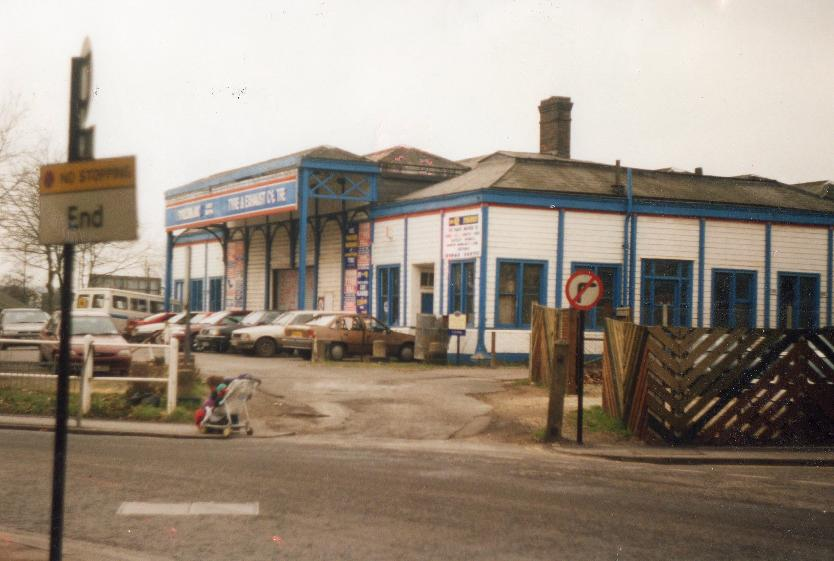
Rewley Road station in 1994.

The line from Bletchley to Oxford was opened by the Buckinghamshire Railway (worked and later owned by the L&NWR) in 1851. The Oxford station was built on the site of Rewley Abbey, a 13th-century Cistercian monastery.

The contractors for the main building were Fox, Henderson who were completing The Crystal Palace at the same time, and they used similar — but not identical — prefabricated cast iron main structural components. The historic importance of this feature caused it to be made a Grade II* listed building. There were two platform faces partly under a glass-roofed train shed; the latter was replaced to a different design in 1888.

The other main feature of the site was Rewley Road Swing Bridge, a swing bridge just to the north, taking the line across the navigable Sheepwash Channel which links the River Thames and the Castle Mill Stream next to the Oxford Canal. The bridge remains in situ but not in use today. There were also extensive sidings for coal and other freight traffic, and a motive power depot.

The Great Western Railway had opened its station in 1852 on an adjacent site, the location of the current Oxford railway station, and the two stations came under joint management in 1933. Rewley Road was closed to passengers by the London Midland Region of British Railways on 1 October 1951 and services transferred to the ex-GWR station. The goods yard remained available for use until 5 April 1984 and was cleared in 1998. After the station closed to passengers the main building was put to commercial use.

The station was described by various names. The station nameboards and official timetables simply stated "Oxford"; however, the name "Oxford Rooley Road" is shown in Bradshaw timetables of June 1869 and September 1885, whilst those of July 1906, June 1920 and January 1944 show "Oxford Rewley Road".

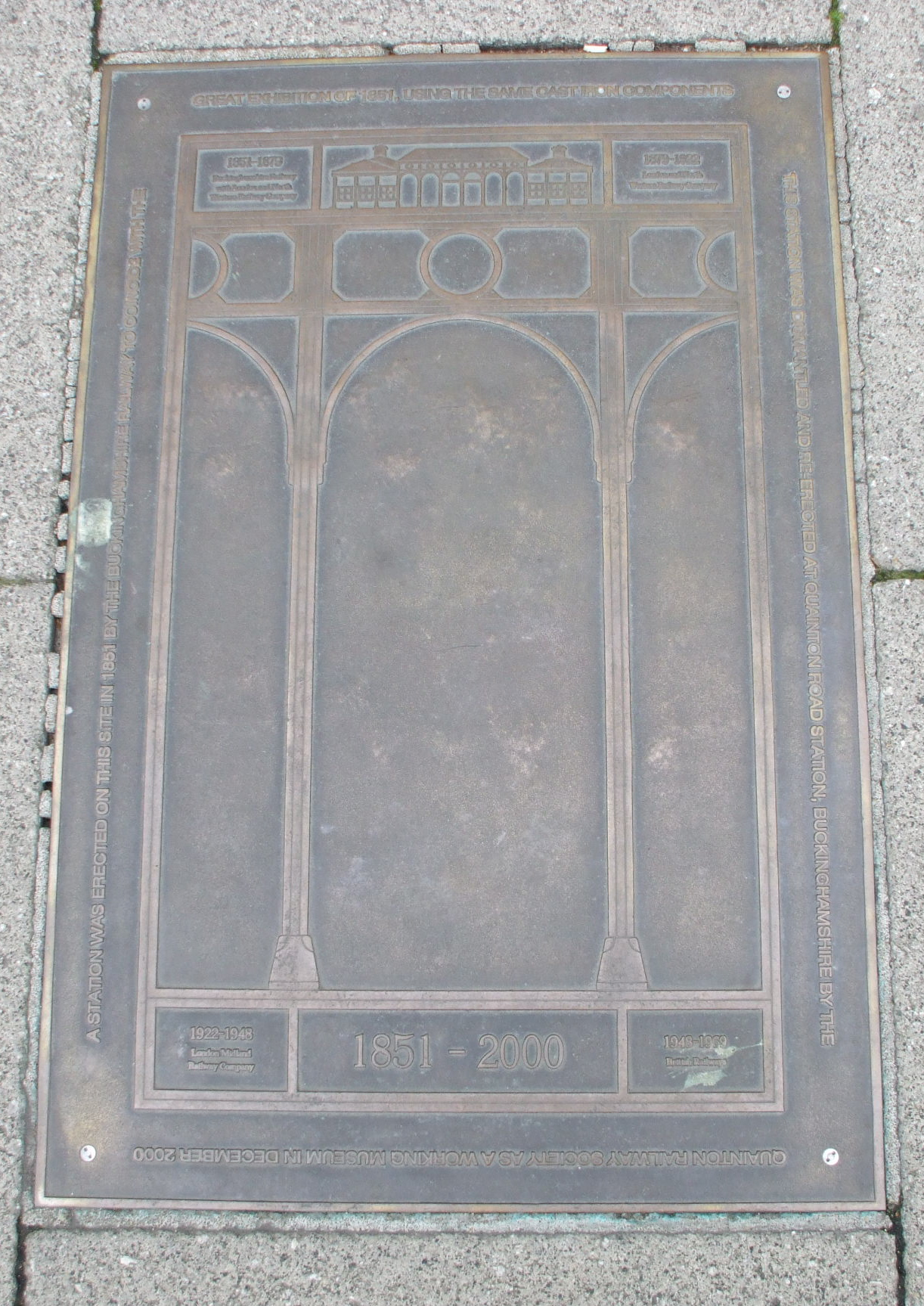
The plaque in front of the Saïd Business School.

Plans to construct new premises for the Saïd Business School of the University of Oxford led to dismantling of the station building in 1999 with the financial support of the University. Official consent to this without a public inquiry, together with associated road works and the cutting down of trees on the perimeter of the site, made the decision controversial and led to the building being occupied for six months culminating in a long and expensive eviction. The building's occupiers were supported by many local politicians and put forward alternative proposals for the junction design and alternative uses for the building, including an art gallery and tourist centre. Part of the controversy surrounding the building of the new business school involved the project's funding coming from Wafic Saïd. The Business School opened in 2001 and the site of the station was subsequently marked by a commemorative plaque. Parts of the goods yard were developed for housing.

The station building components were moved to the Buckinghamshire Railway Centre at Quainton Road railway station where they were refurbished and re-erected, with support from the Heritage Lottery Fund, as a visitor centre and display building, formally opened in 2002, so that Rewley Road station once again houses railway trains.

== Routes ==
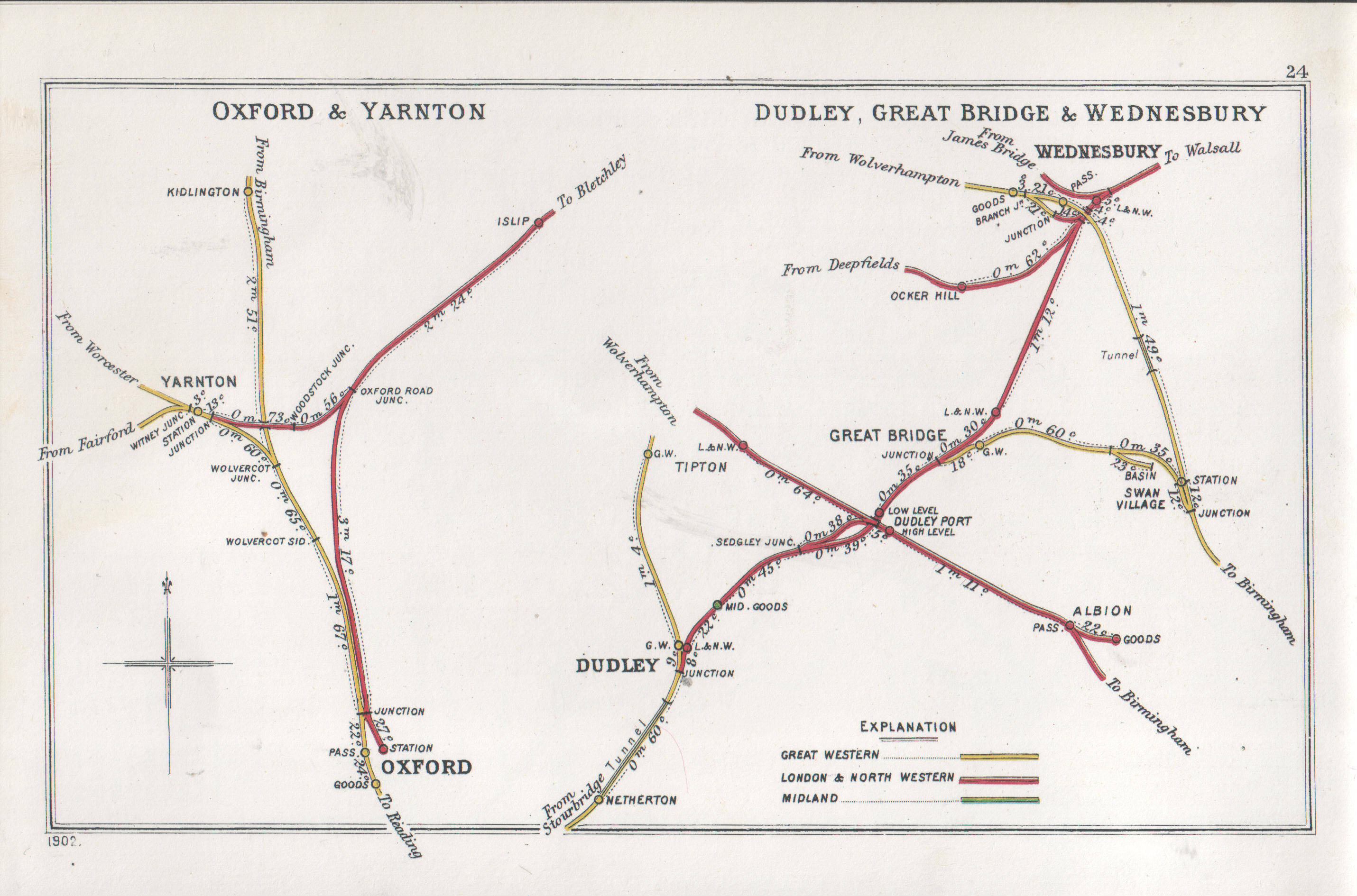
A 1902 Railway Clearing House map of railways in the vicinity of Oxford

Preceding station	Disused railways	Following station
Terminus	London and North Western Railway; Varsity Line	Port Meadow Halt; Line and station closed

== Bibliography ==
- Butt, R. V. J. (October 1995). The Directory of Railway Stations: details every public and private passenger station, halt, platform and stopping place, past and present (1st ed.). Sparkford: Patrick Stephens Ltd. ISBN 978-1-85260-508-7. OCLC 60251199. OL 11956311M.
- Copsey, John (2004). "Oxford Rewley Road into the Twenties". British Railway Journal. 8 (72): 266–285, 294–295.
- Mitchell, Vic; Smith, Keith (July 2005). Oxford to Bletchley. Country Railway Routes. Middleton Press. ISBN 1-904474-57-8.
- Simpson, Bill (1981). Oxford to Cambridge Railway, vol. 1. Oxford Publishing Co. ISBN 0-86093-120-X.
- Turner, Chris (2004). "Oxford Rewley Road — Operation in the 1940s". British Railway Journal. 8 (73): 310–330.
- Waters, Laurence (1986). Rail centres: Oxford. Ian Allan. ISBN 0-7110-1590-2.
- Waters, Laurence (April 2003). "The L&NWR and LMS in Oxford". Steam Days (164): 247–255.
