= Israel Postal Company =

Company

Coordinates: 31°47′18″N 35°12′4″E

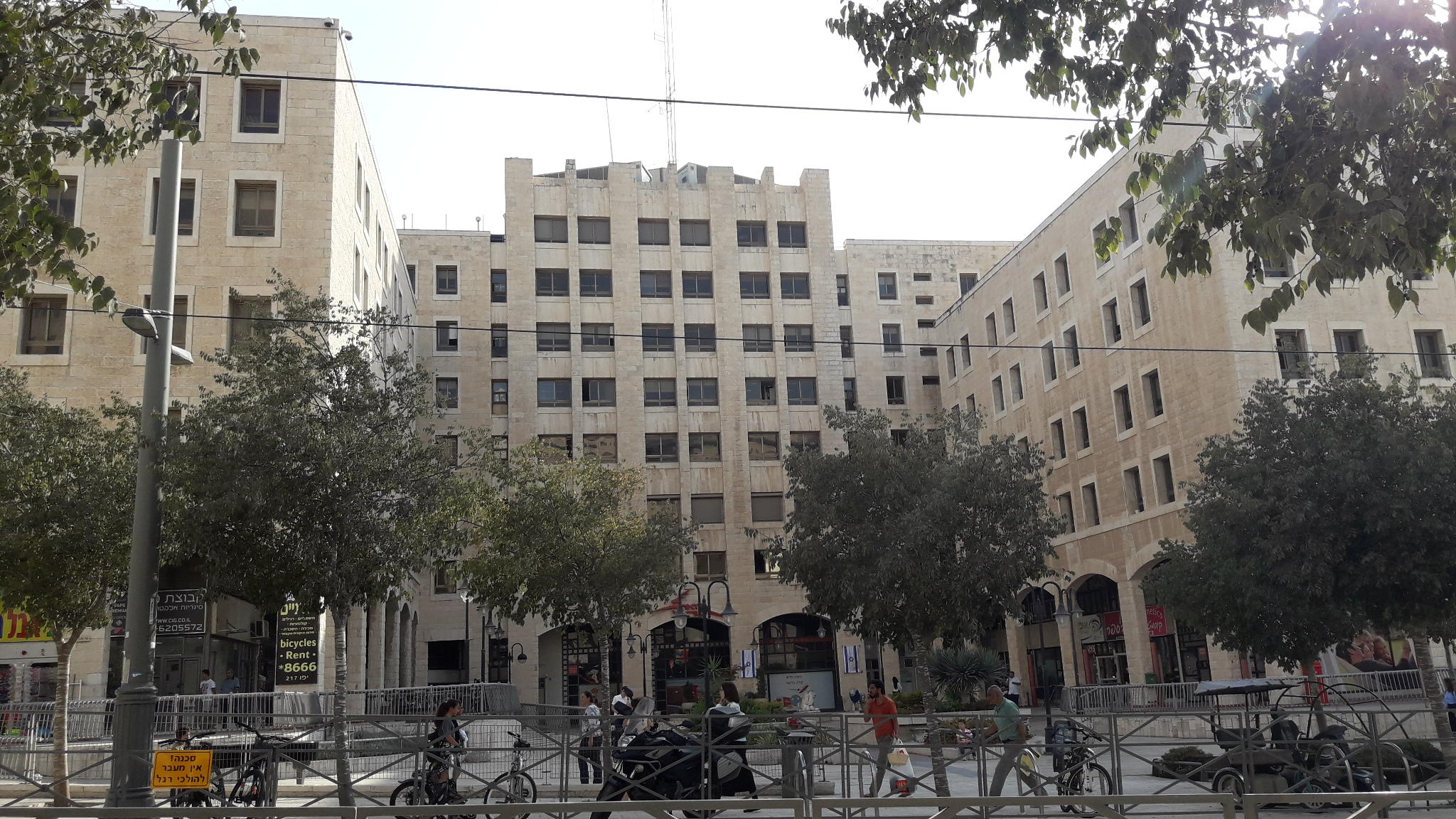
- Former company headquarters in Jerusalem used until 2021
- Trade name: Israel Post
- Native name: דואר ישראל
- Type: Public
- Industry: Postal Services, courier, banking
- Founded: Ministry of Transport, Postal, Telegraph and Radio (1948–1987); Israel Postal Authority (1987–2006); Israel Postal Company (2006–present)
- Headquarters: 21 Hareches Boulevard, Modi'in-Maccabim-Re'ut, Israel
- Area served: Israel
- Products: Letter post, parcel service, EMS, delivery, freight forwarding, third-party logistics, deposit accounts
- Revenue: ₪1,750,000,000
- Owner: Milgam
- Number of employees: ≈5,000
- Subsidiaries: Bank Hado'ar (Post Bank)
- Website: www.israelpost.co.il

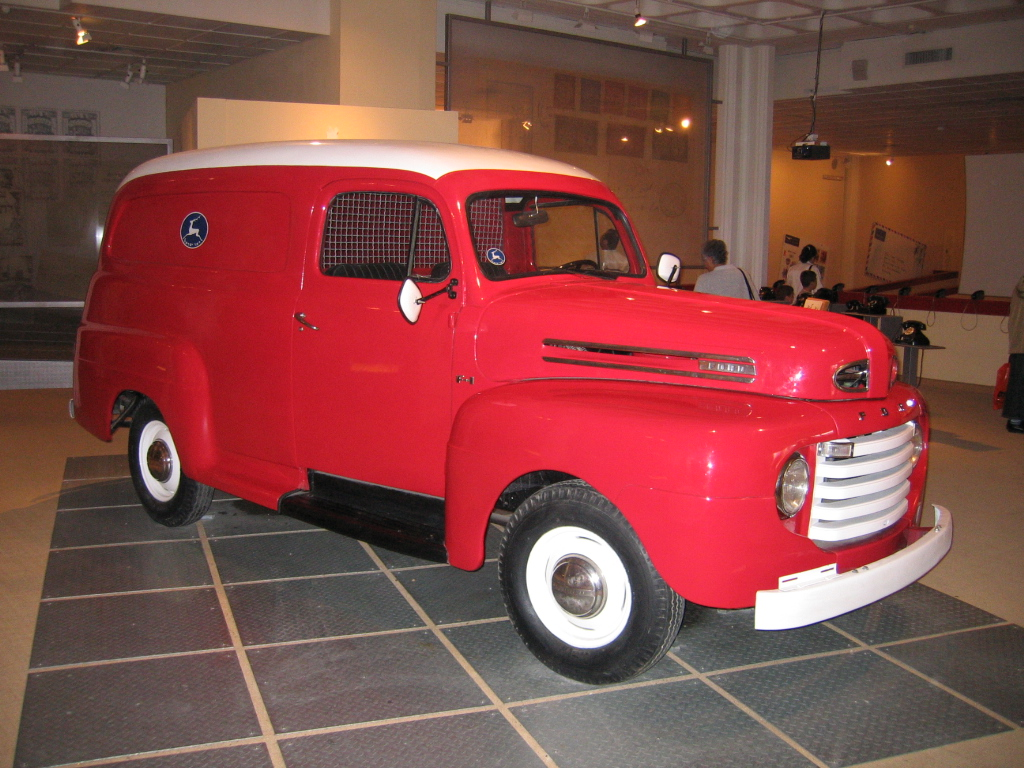
Ford F-1 truck used by Israel Postal Company in 1948-1949, now at Eretz Israel Museum, Philatelic Building.

The Israel Postal Company (Hebrew: דואר ישראל, romanized: Do'ar Yisra'el), from 1987 to 2006 operated as the Israel Postal Authority and currently doing business as Israel Post, is a postal company that provides postal services in Israel. Formerly a government-owned corporation, it was privatised in 2024.

Israel Post has 5,000 employees, including 1,650 mail delivery staff and 2,000 postal clerks manning 700 post office branches around the country. It has a network of 4,262 mail boxes and 1,000 mail trucks. Some 2.5 million postal items are sorted every day.

== History ==
Flag of Israel Postal Authority (not in use)

The Israel Postal Company has its roots in the postal system from the British Mandate period (1920-1948). In 1948, after the establishment of the State of Israel, the Ministry of Transportation was given responsibility for the provision of postal services in the country. In 1951, the Ministry of Postal Services was established, which later became the Ministry of Communications. Close to the British model, the services included delivery of letters, parcels, and telegrams, as well as telephone services. The Israeli Postal Bank opened in 1951. The Israel Postal Authority was created in 1986.

Postal services in Israel have historically operated at a loss. In 2002, the loss was NIS 150 million, and in 2003 it was NIS 200 million. In 2002, in the wake of these losses, political scandals and technological developments in communications, major reforms were implemented. A new government company, the Israel Postal Company Ltd., was founded and went into operation in March 2006. Since 2007, the financial situation has improved, and Israel Post is now making a small profit.

In June 2013, Israel Post signed an agreement to deploy the latest version of Escher's Group Riposte retail software, a peer-to-peer network technology.

In October 2014, Israel Post announced that it would be laying off 1,200 employees and dropping mail delivery to twice a week. Additionally, several branches were closed, while hours of those branches that remained were extended, to reduce waiting times. In March 2015, Israel Post added the ability to make appointments online or via an app, in another effort to reduce waiting times.

In February 2023, the general license under which Israel Post operates was updated. In the first half of 2023, the company's revenues, led by Chairman Mishael Vaknin and CEO David Laron, grew to NIS 849 million, an increase of 12% compared to the first half of 2022. At the same time, the cost of sales decreased by approximately 12% to NIS 725 million – partly as a result of branch closures and the reduction of approximately 1,000 employees from the company (out of approximately 5,000) as part of a recovery plan. As a result, the company reported a profit of NIS 29 million, compared to a loss of NIS 176 million in the corresponding period the previous year.

In May 2024, the tender for the privatisation of the company ended and it was acquired for NIS 468 million by a group that included the companies Milgam (51.7%), Phoenix Insurance Company (21.1%), Phoenix Pension and Provident (13.2%), and Layman Schlissel (15%). The Competition Authority approved the acquisition on the condition that Milgam would not use information about Rav Kav held by Israel Post, and would not open a printing press without the authority's approval. The deal was completed on 14 November 2024. After the privatisation was completed, Mishael Vaknin announced his resignation from the position of Chairman of the Board of Directors of Israel Post.

== Political appointments ==
Being a government authority, the Israeli Postal Authority was a fertile bed for political appointments - quoting judge Revivi's take: "From the unraveling of testimonies, a grim picture rises, of an authority, in which the phenomena of political appointments has spread under every minister's shift".

== Improper function complaints ==
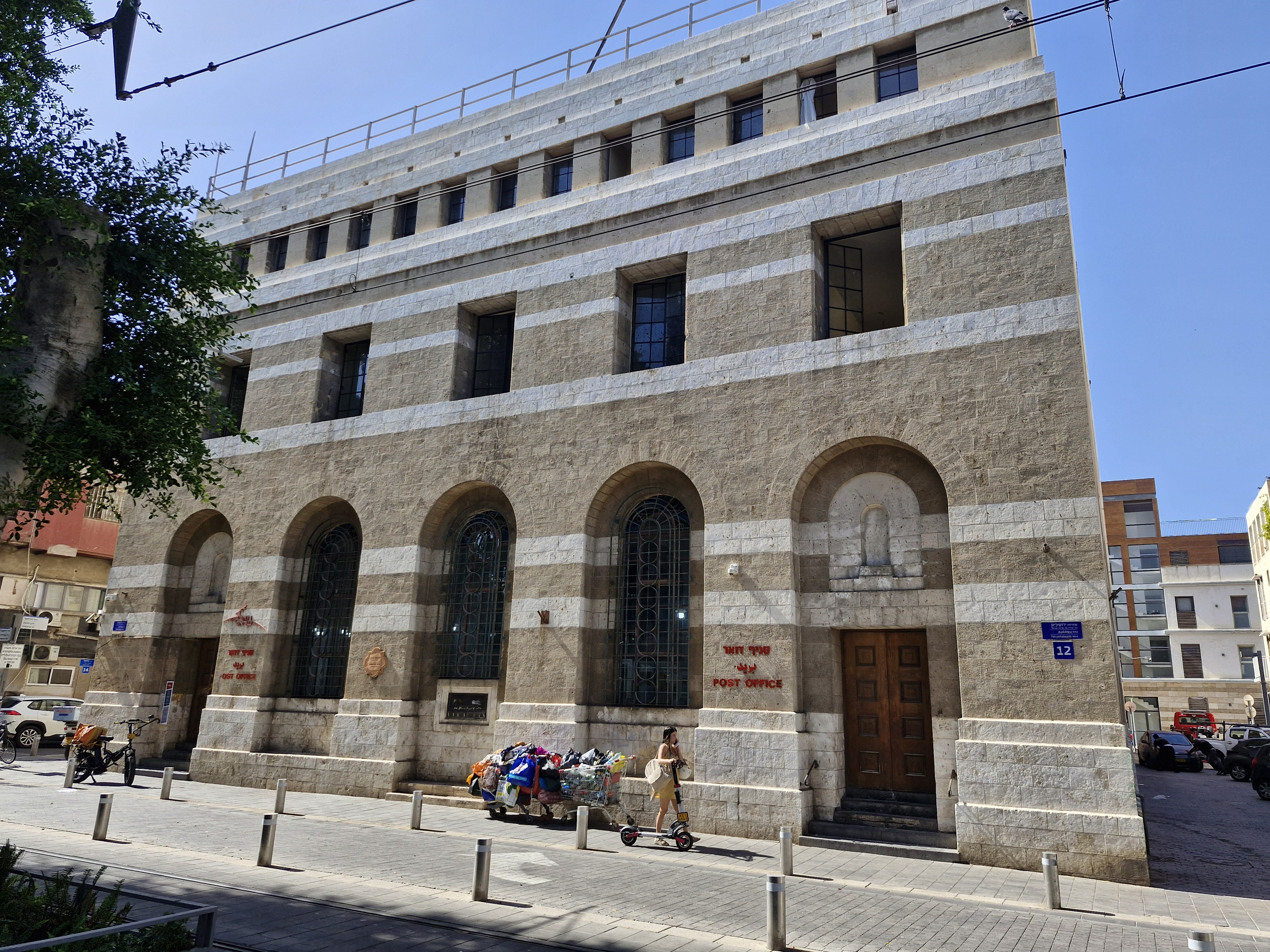
A post office on Jerusalem Boulevard, Tel Aviv Yaffo

Public complaints over the improper functioning of the Israel Postal Company have accumulated over the years. Such complaints were still on the rise during the last decade - in July 2015 the State Comptroller of Israel issued a report, stating that the highest rate of rightful complaints he received were issue against the Postal Company. 70% of complaints were found justified. As of 2019, the dissatisfaction of the public from the company's function seems to only be increasing - with State Comptroller of Israel issuing another harsh report - mentioning: "In recent years, the number of complaints filed with the Office has increased. The Israel Postal Company is the audited body against which the highest percentage of justified complaints were filed: 74.2% in 2017, whereas the overall percentage of justified complaints for that year stood at 32.2%. It appears that this trend continued into 2018."

== Israeli philately ==
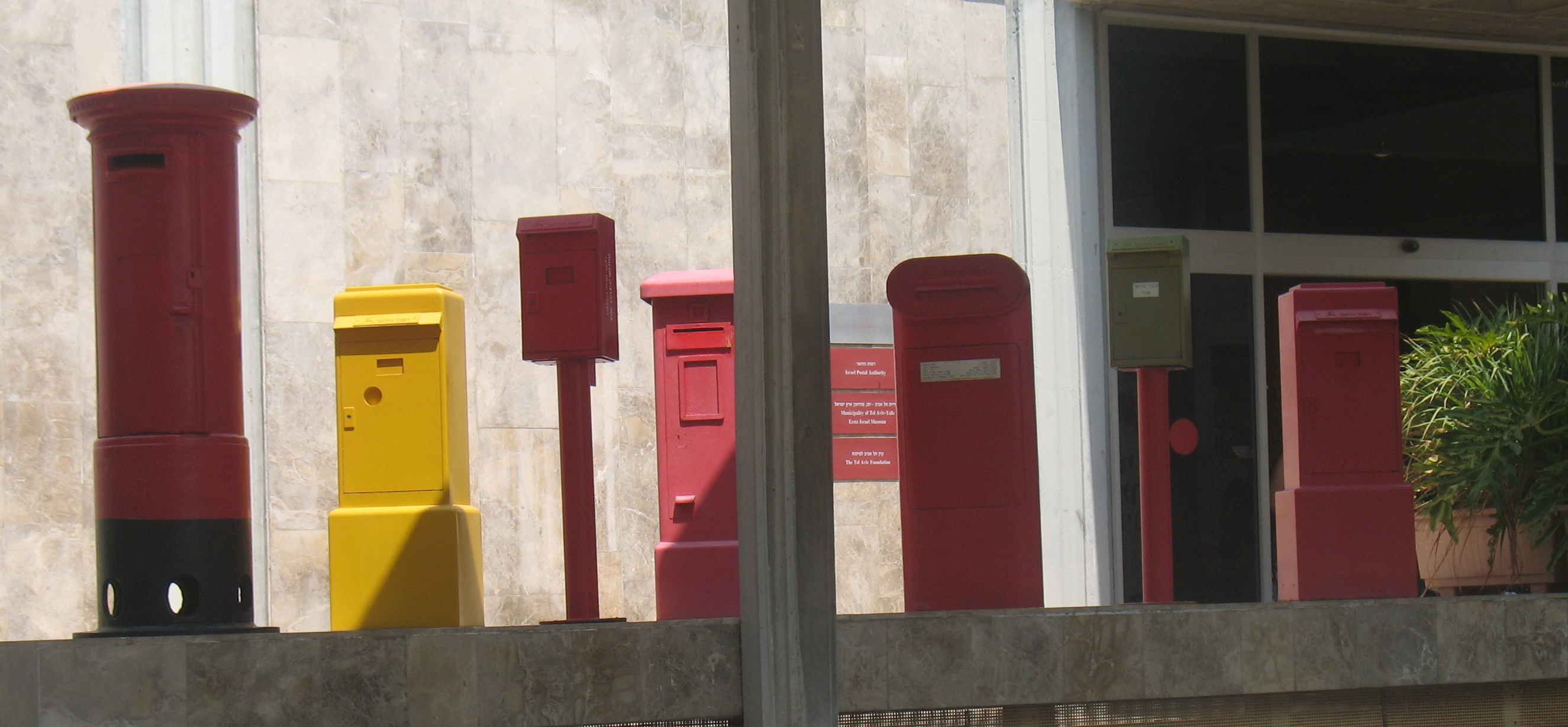
Mailboxes used by the Israel Postal Service, Eretz Israel Museum, Philatelic Pavilion.

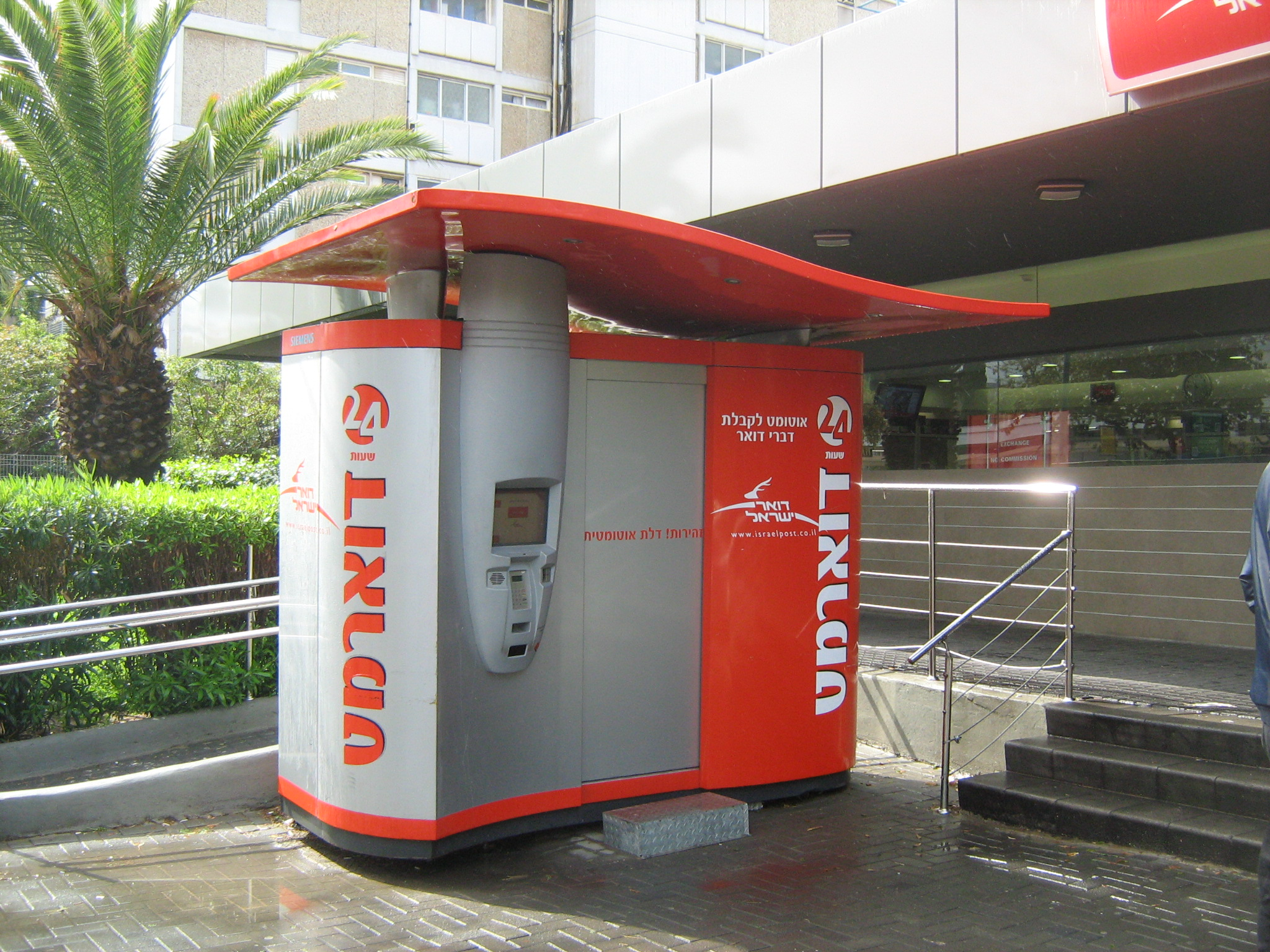
Automated package pick-up in Tel Aviv

In April 1948, the British discontinued all postal services. On Friday, 14 May 1948, Israel declared independence. On Sunday morning, the new state issued its first stamps. There was virtually no paper for printing stamps and no appropriate printing presses or perforating machines. Even the name of the country had not yet been finalized. Nevertheless, Doar Ivri ("Hebrew Post") stamps appeared immediately after the declaration of independence, and went on sale at postal branches throughout the country.

The Israel Philatelic Service was previously located on 137 Haganah Street in Tel-Aviv, but moved to 2 Pinsker Street in late 2019.

== Letters to God ==
Every year, the Israel Postal Company receives thousands of letters from all over the world addressed to God. Rather than consider them dead letters, the letters are collected at the Givat Shaul central mail facility. Once a year, they are taken to the Old City and placed between the stones of the Western Wall in a festive ceremony. The post office also receives letters addressed to Jesus Christ, the Virgin Mary and King David, but only those addressed to God are sent to the Western Wall.

== Postal Bank ==
Postal bank is a part of Israel Postal Company and supervised by the Ministry of Communications according to the postal service laws, like other postal services. It cannot provide credit activities in any way, but maintains regular checking accounts for the customers, including check books which are regular payment instruments in Israel, debit cards, money transfers and account standing orders.

== See also ==
- Postage stamps and postal history of Israel
- Postal codes in Israel
