= Jerusalem Street =

Jerusalem Street can refer to one of the following streets:

- Aleje Jerozolimskie in Warsaw, Poland
- Sderot Yerushalayim in Jaffa, Israel
