= Austen Harrison =

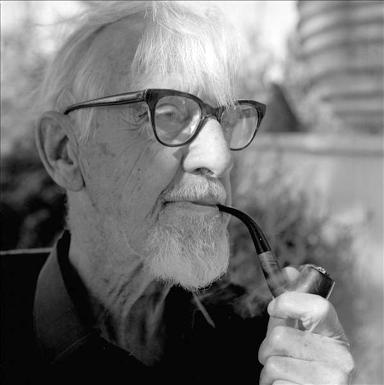
- Austen Harrison (1970s), photo by Dimitri Papadimos
- Born: 1891; Kent, UK
- Died: 1976 (aged 84–85)
- Education: McGill University, Montreal
- Occupation: Architect
- Buildings: Rockefeller Museum
- Projects: Buildings of Nuffield College, Oxford

Austen St. Barbe Harrison (1891–1976) was a British-born architect. While British, Harrison spent most of his career overseas, and mainly in the Middle East. His works include the British Representative's Residence, Amman, the High Commissioner's Residence, Jerusalem, the Rockefeller Museum, Jerusalem, 1935, and Nuffield College, Oxford.

== Biography ==
=== Early life and WWI ===
Harrison was born in Kent in 1891. One of his ancestors was the renowned novelist Jane Austen after whom he was named.

His upper-middle-class family pushed him to pursue a career in the military. After attending Sandhurst, he was commissioned as a Lieutenant in the British Army and found himself in the trenches at the 1917 Battle of Passchendaele, near Ypres in Flanders, Belgium, during the Great War. The horror of what he saw convinced him that he wanted no part of either the military nor the war. When he informed his commanding officer that he intended to resign from the service and return to England, the officer told him that he could be court-martialled for refusing orders and desertion. Undeterred, Harrison replied, "So be it." Harrison's decision created a problem for the officer who apparently knew the young lieutenant's family and did not wish to suffer the indignity of having one of his junior officers court-martialled. Harrison, for his part, had no desire to create a scandal or crusade as a pacifist. He merely wanted no part of killing other human beings. The officer and Harrison eventually reached a compromise: Harrison could resign his commission and serve as stretcher bearer for the remainder of the campaign. Later in life, in recounting his experiences in that ghastly battle, he described how the greatest danger that the stretcher-bearers and medics faced was the ubiquitous mud. The battle was fought largely in swamp land during periods of unusually heavy rainfall. To step off the board walks—which were necessitated by the conditions—while carrying the dead and wounded from the front was to risk literally drowning in mud. At the end of his life, as time past and present merged in his mind, he relived the terror of that experience, confusing those around him with his stretcher-bearing comrades and warning them of the treacherous mud.

=== Studies ===
After the war, he travelled to Canada where he studied architecture at McGill University, Montreal in Canada. He also pursued his favourite hobby: hiking. Later in life, while living in Jerusalem, he once walked from Amman, Jordan, to Cairo. Harrison completed his architectural studies at the School of Architecture at University College, London.

=== Greece ===
Harrison joined the Department of Reconstruction for Eastern Macedonia after the First World War, where he was appointed Assistant Architect and Town Planner; his tasks included planning Nigrita and other settlements in Greece.

=== Palestine (1923-37) ===
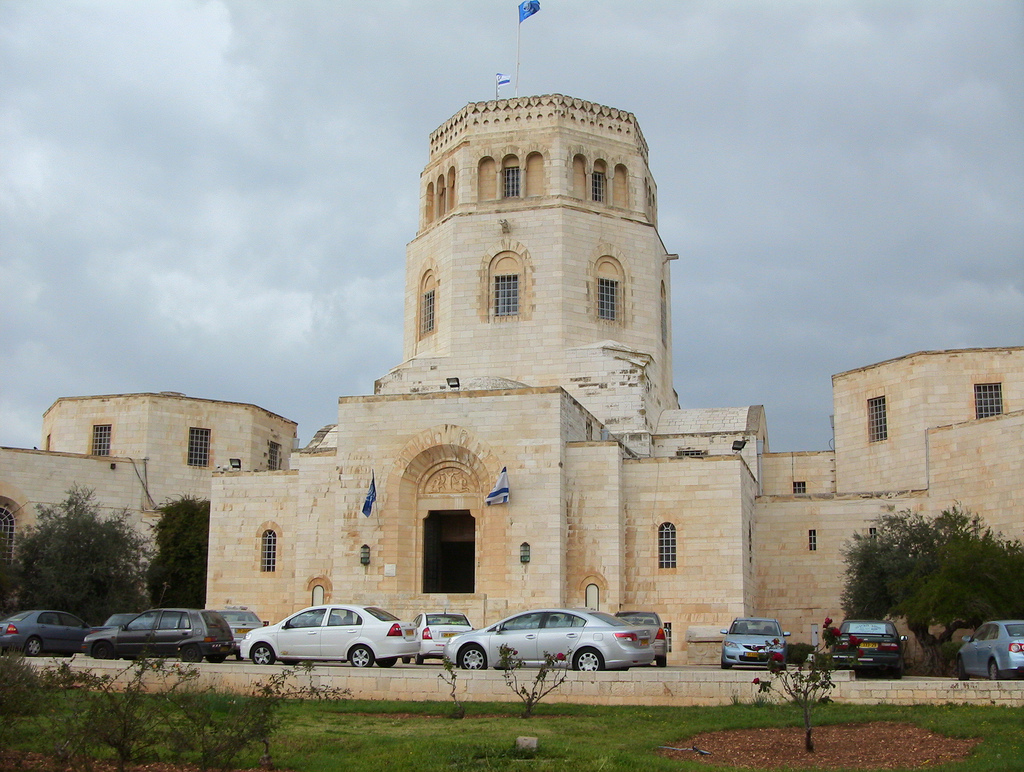
Rockefeller Museum, Jerusalem

His next position (from 1923 onwards) was as Chief Architect to the Department of Public Works in the civil administration of British Palestine, which led to him designing various edifices in places such as Jerusalem and Amman. As the Chief Architect in Palestine from 1923 to 1937, Harrison was responsible for a number of buildings, none more impressive than the Rockefeller Museum. The museum, which was recently renovated, is an excellent example of Harrison's art. While the exterior is a wonderful amalgam of modern trends from the 1930s and traditional Middle Eastern themes, the interior is no less inspiring. Harrison once said that architecture is the "sculpting of space" and the museum is a testament to that sentiment. In designing the museum, he collaborated closely with Eric Gill, a widely renowned designer of the time. Much of the detailed work both inside and outside the museum are Gill's designs. Harrison also befriended George Horsfield, the Chief Inspector of Antiquities in Transjordan, and John Crowfoot, the second Director of the British School of Archaeology in Jerusalem.

During his nearly 15 years in Jerusalem, he came to know many of the most famous residents and visitors to Palestine, including Albert Einstein. When Einstein visited Jerusalem in 1923, Harrison invited him to his home, presumably to discuss Einstein's plans for what would eventually become Hebrew University. Einstein repaid Harrison's hospitality by playing his violin for the architect. Harrison was also a great admirer of Arab culture—particularly, traditional Arabic architecture and design. He counted many Arabs among his friends and was outraged by the terms on which the British ended their mandate in Palestine.

=== England, Egypt, etc. ===
After a donation to the University of Oxford from Lord Nuffield, Harrison next was appointed as architect for the newly established Nuffield College, Oxford, but the donor rejected his first plans for the college (which were heavily influenced by medieval Mediterranean buildings and traditional Arab design) and refused to allow his name to be associated with them, saying that they were "un-English". Harrison modified the design so that the college looked like "something on the lines of Cotswold domestic architecture", as Nuffield wanted. Harrison's rejected design has been described as Oxford's "most notable architectural casualty of the 1930s". Nuffield College seems to have been the only building in Britain that he designed; his other work included the University College of the Gold Coast (today's University of Ghana), and a report (in 1945) on the planning of Valletta, Malta.

=== Cyprus ===
While living in Cyprus in the 1950s, Harrison befriended the writer Lawrence Durrell and helped Durrell who was struggling to support his family as a teacher. Durrell's wife was suffering a mental illness and it fell to Durrell to care for his children and his wife. One of the fruits of Durrell's writing is his book about Cyprus, Bitter Lemons, that is dedicated to Harrison.

=== Athens. Death. ===
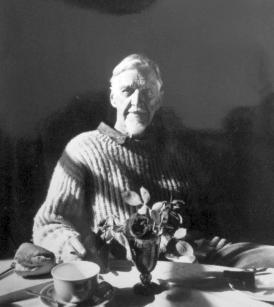
Harrison in Katounia, 1960s photo by Dimitri Papadimos

Harrison subsequently moved to Athens. There he lived with his adopted family of Dimitri Papadimos, photographer, whom he had met in Cairo in the 1930s and who was "war photographer" for the Greek Forces that fought by the side of the Allies during the Second World War. Dimitri's wife Liana (or Eleni Frangia,, as she was known in the all-female resistance organisation SPITHA, active during the occupation of Greece by Nazi Germany), and their son Ioannis (Yani). He died at the Papadimos family home in 1976.

== Archive ==
Ioannis (Yani) Papadimos, the son of Dimitri Papadimos, one of the main contributors to this article, has written here in July 2010 that "The Papadimos family donated the Austen St. Barbe Harrison archive to the Rockefeller Museum." In a book by Adina Hoffman the author is mentioning the Austen St. Barbe Harrison archive at the Israel Antiquities Authority (IAA), whose seat is at the Rockefeller Museum. Ron Fuchs, a History of Architecture lecturer who wrote his PhD dissertation and further articles on Harrison, writes that Harrison's personal archive was, at least in parts, transferred from Dimitri Papadimos' estate to the IAA, but that the largest part of his personal material from the Palestine period had already been destroyed in Cairo in 1942, all papers of his Oxford-based firm finding the same fate when it closed down in 1968, and Harrison himself burned a great many of his personal papers before his death.

== Works ==
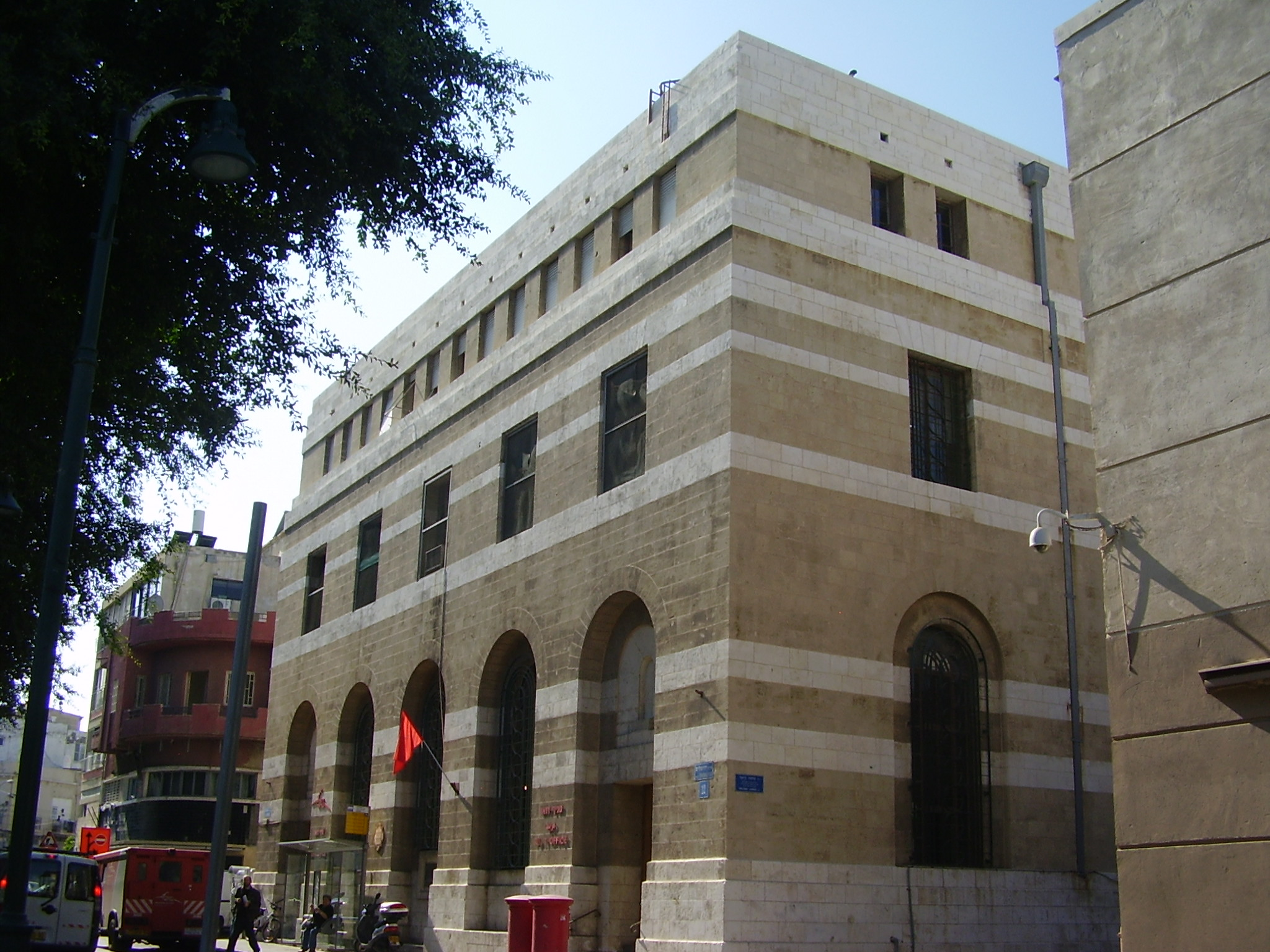
The Central Post House of Jaffa on the Sderot Yerushalayim, designed by Austen Harrison in 1931

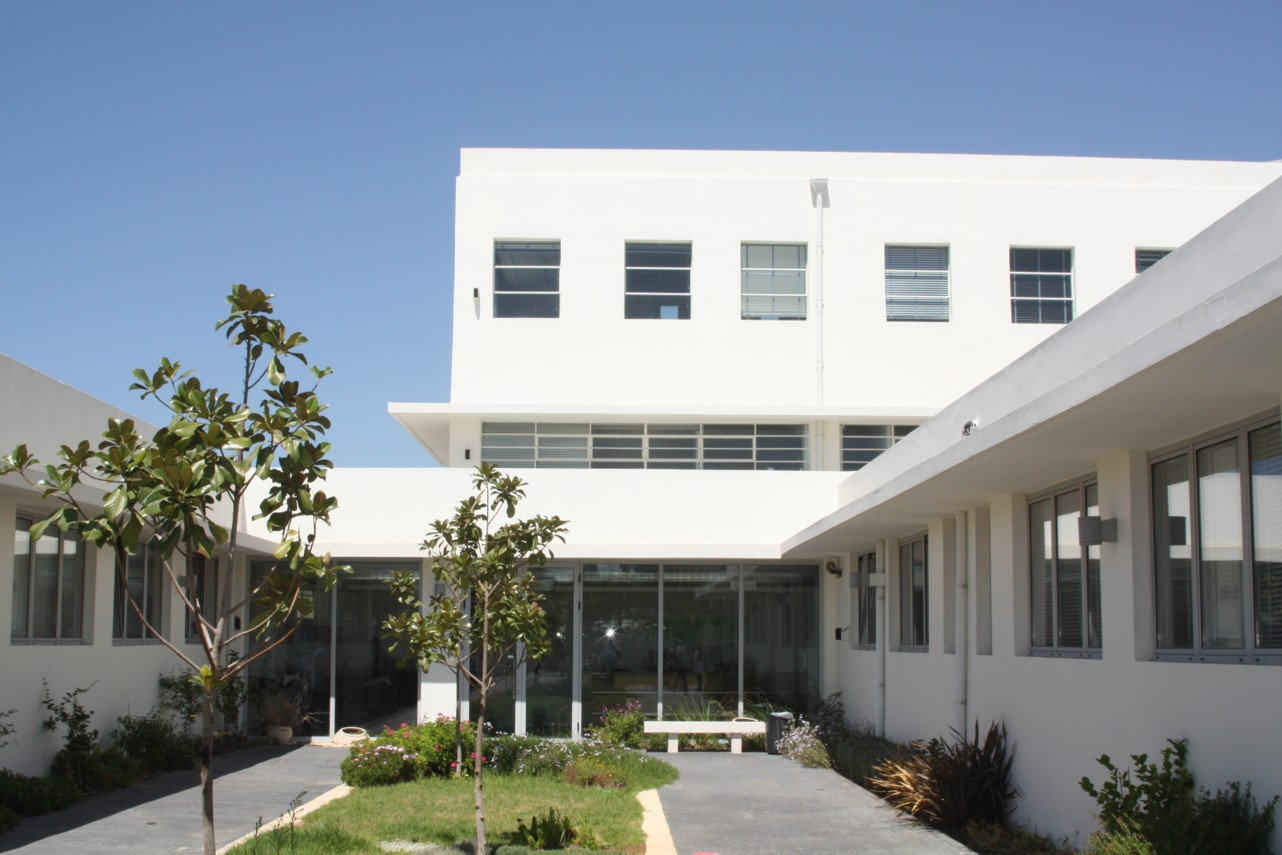
Government Mint building, Jerusalem

- British Representative's Residence, Amman, Jordan, 1926
- Rockefeller Museum (Palestine Archaeological Museum), East Jerusalem, 1930-1938
- Government House (High Commissioner's Residence & Headquarters, present United Nations Headquarters), Jerusalem, 1931
- Government Mint building, Jerusalem, 1935. Established in 1937. (For current owner see here)
- Central Post House, Jerusalem, 1938
- Central Post House, Jaffa
- Nuffield College, Oxford 1938-1960
- Reconstruction plan for Valletta, Malta, 1943
- University College of the Gold Coast, now University of Ghana, Legon, Accra, Ghana, 1958

== See also ==
- Charles Robert Ashbee, first British-appointed town planner of Jerusalem (1919-1922)
- Patrick Geddes, designed the master plan for Tel Aviv in 1927
- Clifford Holliday, town planner and architect active in Mandatory Palestine between 1922-1935
- Richard Kauffmann, Jewish-German town planner and architect active in Mandatory Palestine
