= Postal codes in Israel =

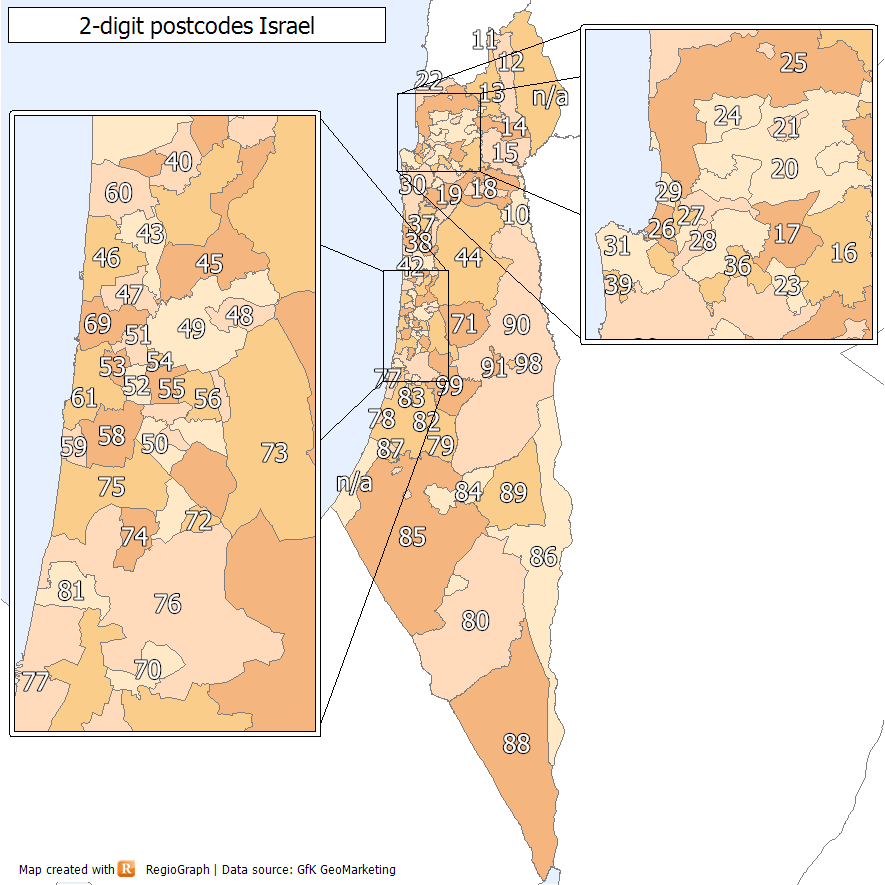
2-digit postcode areas Israel (defined through the first two postal code digits)

Postal codes in Israel (Hebrew: מיקוד, Mikud) are seven digit numeric postal codes in use in Israel. Each postal code corresponds to a mail carrier route or RR, thus, when the letters are sorted by the postal code, they are assigned to a specific carrier.

Postal codes are assigned by Israel Post generally from north to south, with the first two postal code digits being the postcode areas — thus, Metula in the north has 1029200 as its postal code, and Eilat in the south was assigned 88xxxxx. Jerusalem postal codes start with the digit 9, although this does not correspond with its geographical location.

Army unit postal codes start with a 0 and are not changed even if a unit is roaming.

== History ==
In March 2012, Israel Post announced a change to 7-digit postal codes, with an implementation date of 5 December 2012, but which was postponed to 1 February 2013. Officially the 5-digit codes remained valid until 31 January 2013, though they continue to be widely used.
