= Dimitri Papadimos =

Greek photographer (1918–1994)

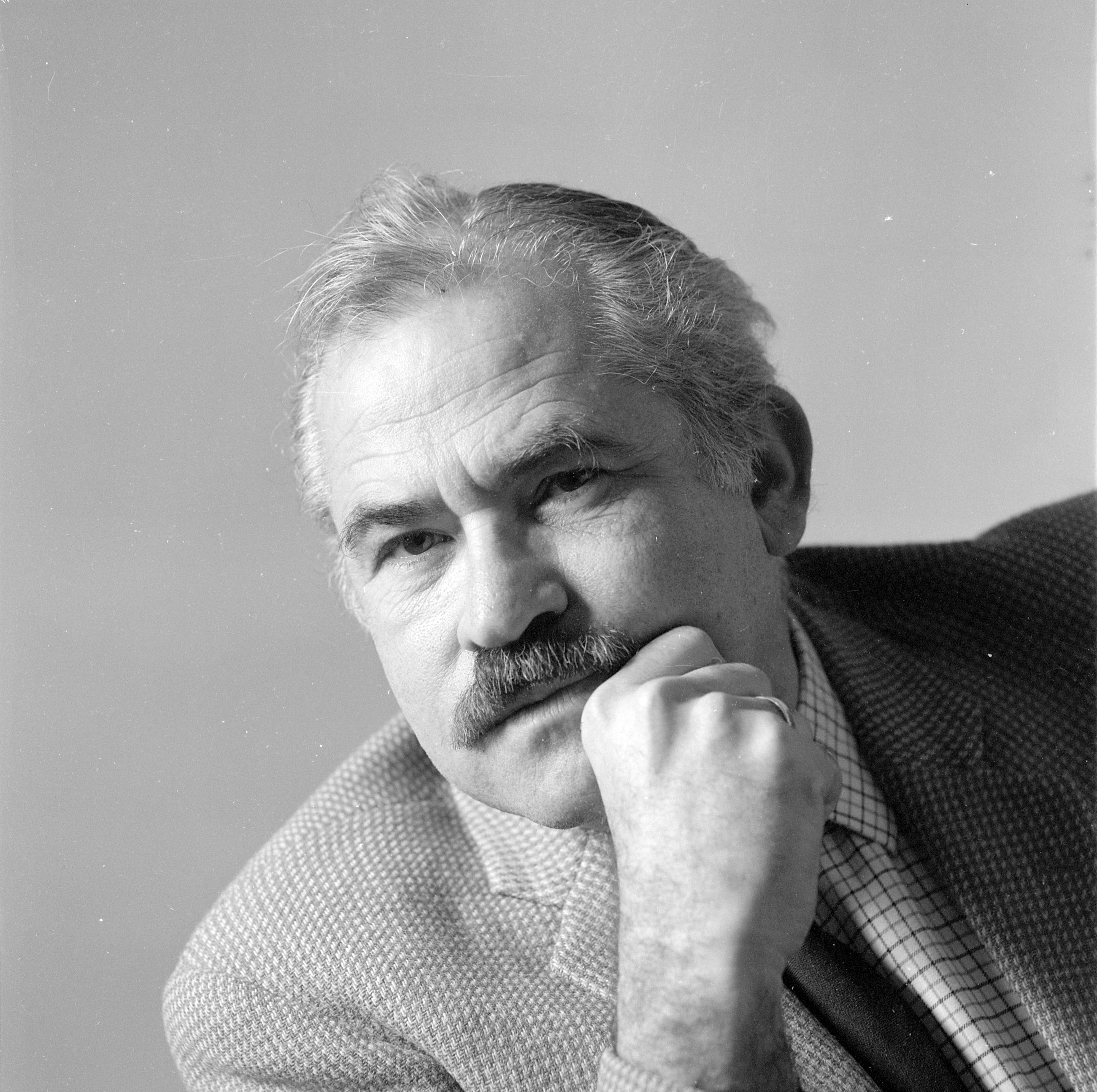
Dimitri Papadimos 1918-1994

Dimitri Papadimos (Greek: Δημήτρης Παπαδήμος; 1 May 1918 - 3 May 1994) was a Greek photographer.

== Early life ==
Papadimos was born in Cairo, Egypt of Greek parents in 1918. His father was from mainland Greece neae Pelion, and his mother was from the Greek island of Imbros. At a young age, Papadimos lost both his parents.

== Career ==
Dimitri Papadimos met the British architect Austen St. Barbe Harrison, in Cairo in the late 1930s . In 1939, Austen Harrison sent Papadimos to study cinematography in Paris but the outbreak of World War II put an early end to his studies. During WWII, Papadimos served as "War Photographer" for the Greek Forces that fought by the side of the Allies. Throughout his professional career he met many European writers, including Robin Maugham, Patrick Balfour, 3rd Baron Kinross, A. W. Lawrence, Philip Sherrard, Francis Noel-Baker and Arab intellectuals such as Hassan Fathy; and was the contributing photographer to many of their works (see Books with photographs by Dimitri Papadimos).

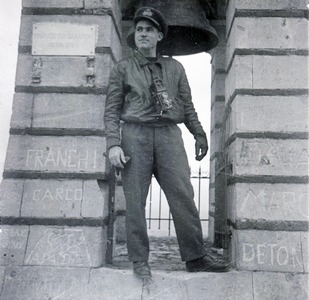
Dimitri Papadimos as a War Photographer, Athens 1944

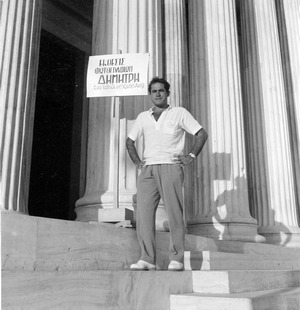
Dimitri Papadimos photo exhibition in Athens 1949

Papadimos' photographs illustrated many magazines and books of travel literature, including Business & Finance, Tourism in Greece, Harper's Bazaar, La Famme Nouvelle, Loisirs, News of the World and Parade. At the same time, he presented his work in exhibitions, 1949-"Life and Landscape in the Middle East" British Institute, Cairo, 1950-"XIIeme Salon National de Photographie", Palais Khedive Ismail, Societe des Amis de l'Art, 1952-"Exposition Mondiale de la Photographie" Luzern Suisse mainly in Cairo and Athens. He moved to Athens in 1956. He traveled throughout Greece, from Thrace to Crete, photographing the land extensively. In 1974, the publishing house "Olkos" published his album Greece: A vanishing culture. In 1981 the second edition of his album appeared, published by the publishing house "Nea Synora". He collaborated with the Museum of Greek Folk Art and the Hellenic Tourism Organization (EOT). He became connected with many artists, including Lawrence Durrell, Jean Cocteau, Austen St. Barbe Harrison, Patrick Leigh Fermor, Melina Mercouri, Robin Maugham, and Philip Sherrard photographing them and their work. He worked in the production of motion pictures, both Greek and foreign such as Jules Dassin, a 1957 French film, He Who Must Die, Phaedra, Carl Forman's The Guns of Navarone and Lawrence Durrell's film The Spirit of Place, a BBC documentary about Egypt. He lived the last years of his life, from 1986 to his death, on the island of Spetses. Papadimos died in Athens in 1994, aged 76.

== Dimitri Papadimos Archive ==
The "Dimitri Papadimos archive" was donated to European League of Institutes of the Arts (ELIA)- The Hellenic Literary and Historical Archive, part of the National Bank of Greece Cultural Foundation (MIET) during the autumn of 1994, a few months after his death. The donation was made by his widow, Liana Papadimou and his son Ioannis D.Papadimos (Yani), according to his wishes.

== Works ==
=== Portraits by Papadimos ===
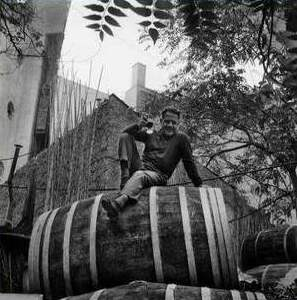
Lawrence Durrell

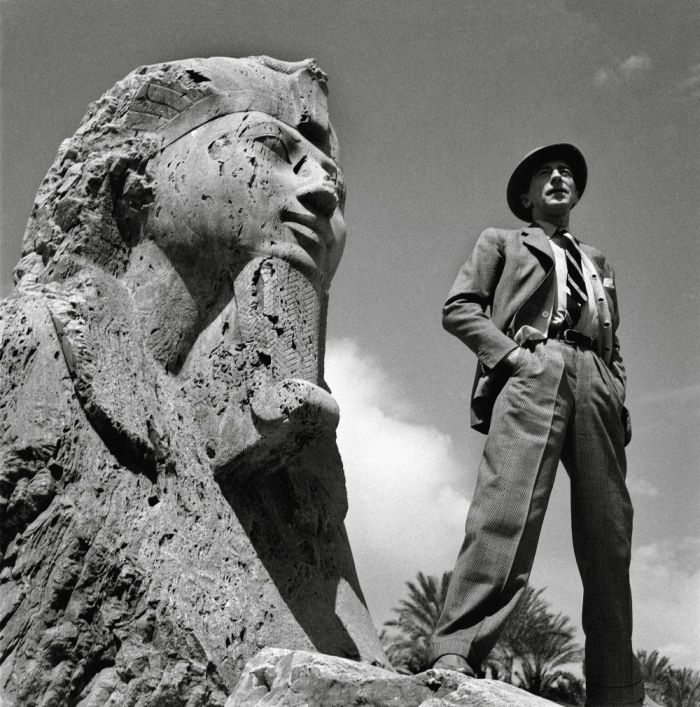
Jean Cocteau

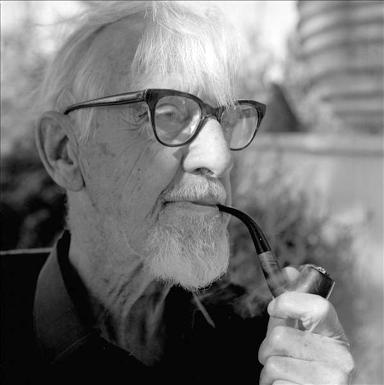
Austen Harrison

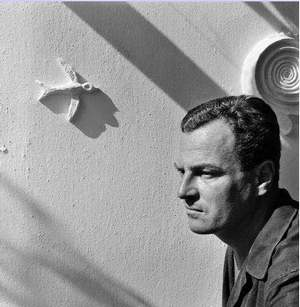
Patrick Leigh Fermor

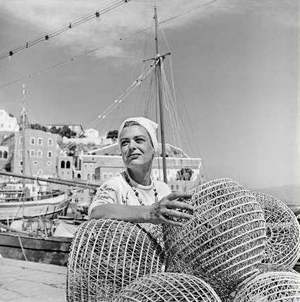
Melina Mercouri

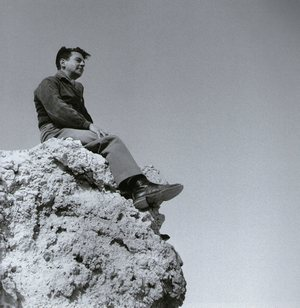
Robin Maugham

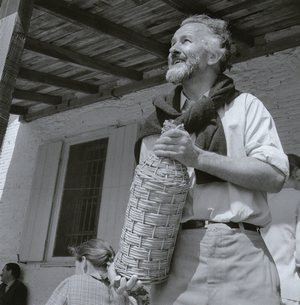
Philip Sherrard

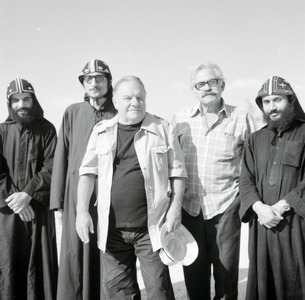
Durrell and Papadimos in Egypt for the BBC "Spirit of Place"

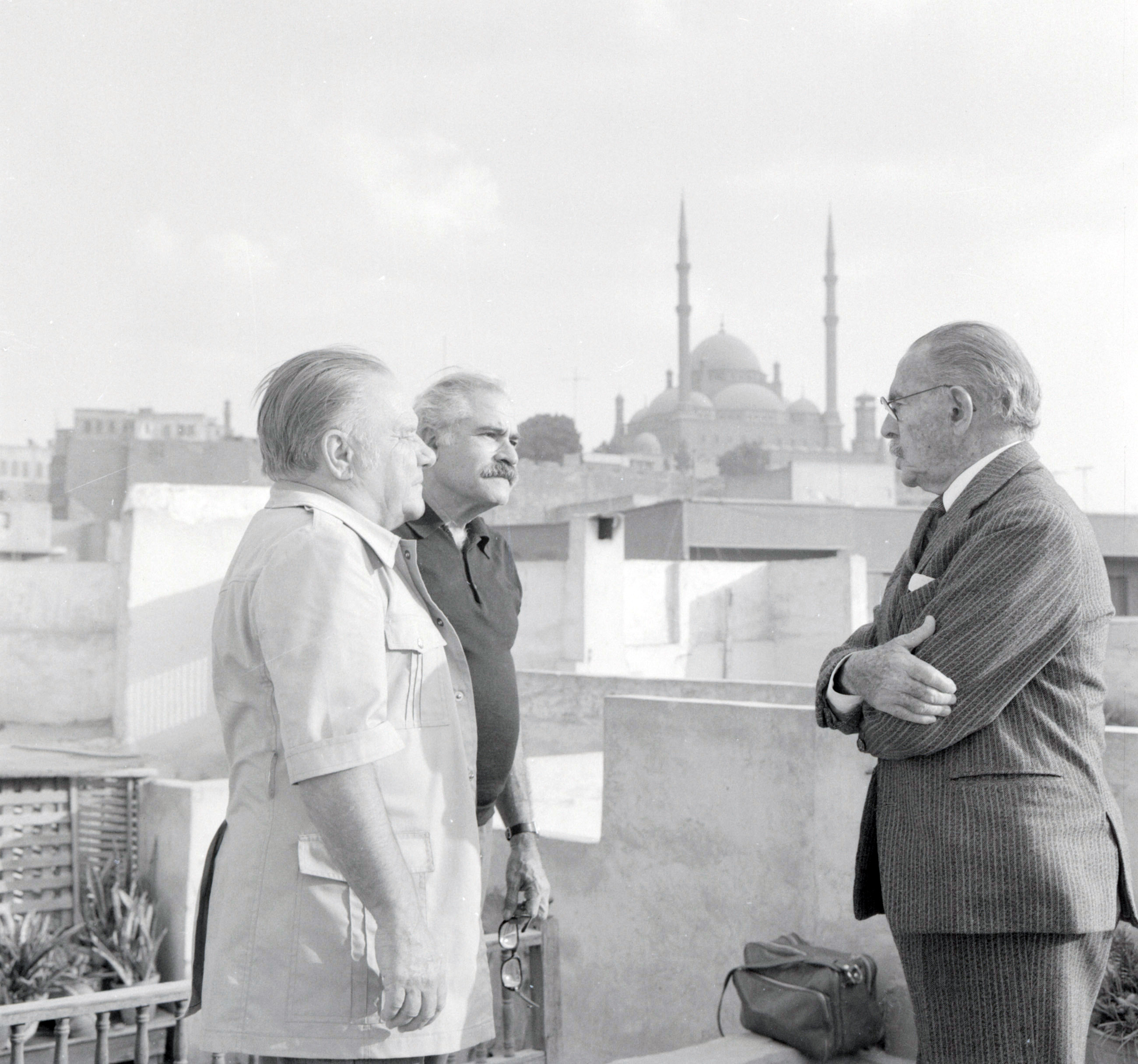
Durrell, Papadimos and Hassan Fathy, Cairo

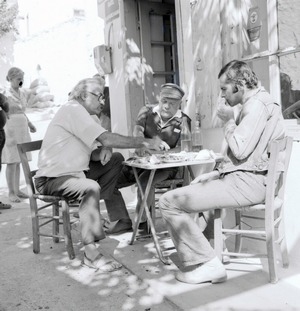
Papadimos with Durrell and BBC producer Peter Adams

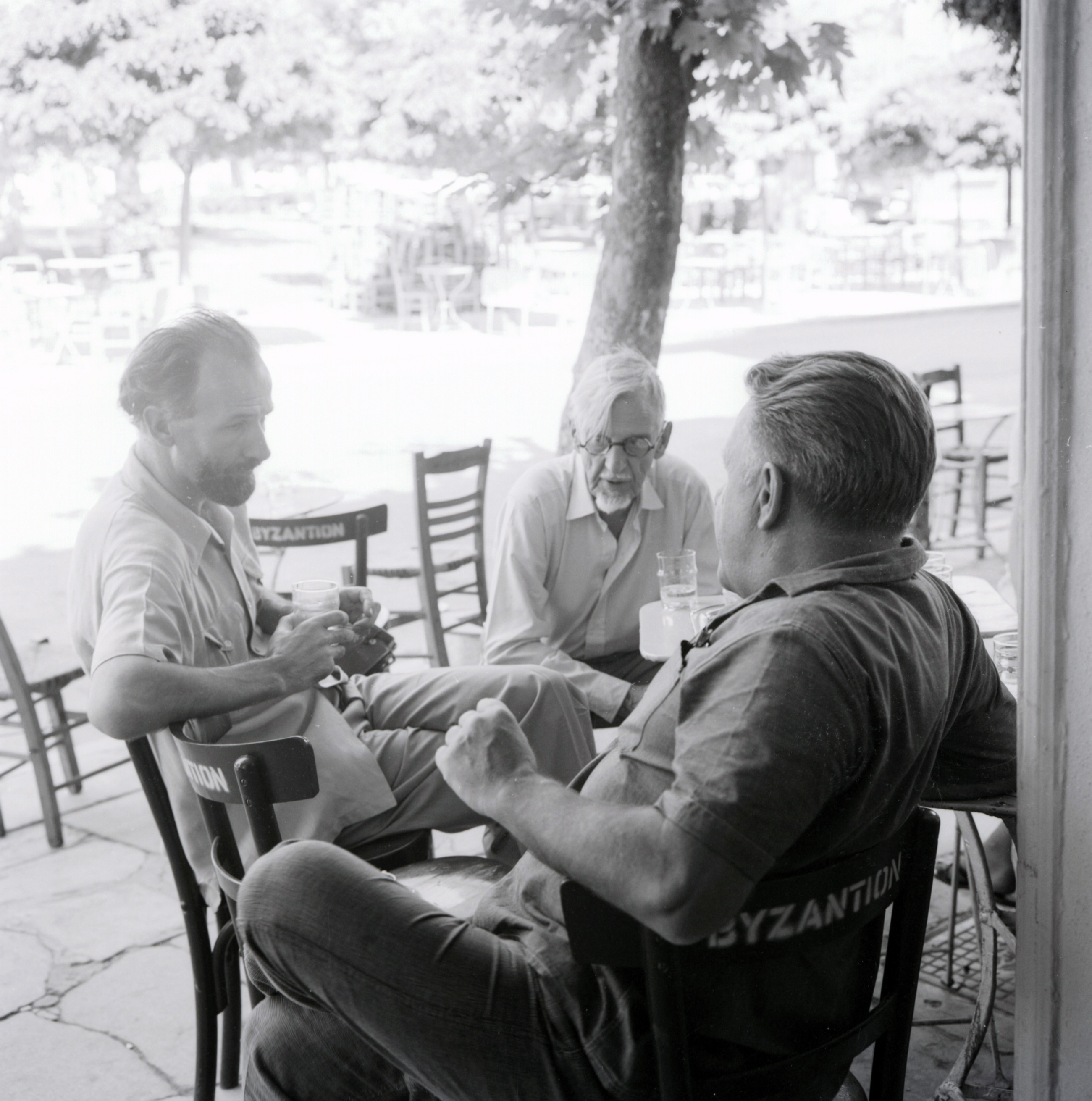
Durrell with Philip Sherard and Austen Harrison, Athens

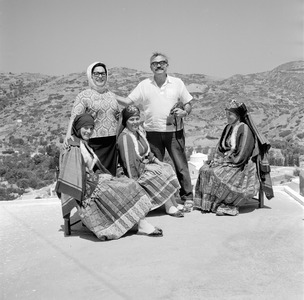
Dimitri Papadimos and wife Liana on assignment (Astipalea Island) for Folk Art Museum, Athens

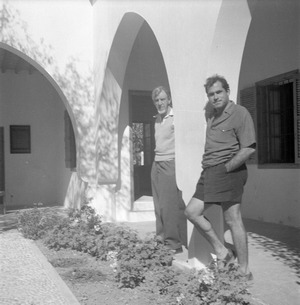
Papadimos and Austen Harrison, Cyprus

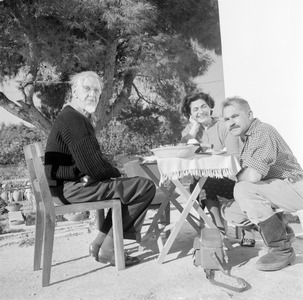
Austen Harrison with his "adopted family" in Athens. Papadimos and his wife Liana

=== Books with photographs by Papadimos ===
- Robin Maugham. "Journey to Siwa", London, Chapman and Hall, 1950.
- Patrick Balfour, "The Orphaned Realm. Journeys in Cyprus", London, Percival Marshall, 1951.
- Lord Kinross (Patrick Balfour)/Dimitri, "Portrait of Greece", London, Max Parrish, 1956.
- Lawrence, A.W./Dimitri Papadimos (Contributing Photographer), "Greek Architecture", Middlesex, Penguin Books, 1957.
- Philip Sherrard/Dimitri (photographs), "The Pursuit of Greece", London, John Murray, 1964.
- Philip sherrard/Dimitri (photographs), "The Pursuit of Greece", Athens, Denise Harvey & Company, 1987.ISBN 9780907978244
- "Marathon", photos by Dimitri, Athens, Bible Travel Service, 1963.
- John Campbell, K., "Honour, Family and Patronage: A Study of Institutions and Moral Values in Greek Mountain Community", Oxford, Clarendon Press, 1964.
- Ντίνος Κονόμος, "Στο Μουσείο Λαϊκής Τέχνης, Ναοί και μονές στην Ζάκυνθο", Αθήνα, εκδόσεις Ιονικής και Λαίκής Τραπέζης Ελλάδος, 1964.
- Lord Kinross (Patrick Balfour)/Dimitri (Contributing photographer), "Portrait of Egypt", London, Andre Deutsch Ltd, 1966.
- Kevin Andrews/Dimitri(Contributing photographer), "Cities of the World", Athens, London, Phoenix House, 1967.
- Ιωάννης Τραυλός, "Νεοκλασσική Αρχιτεκτονική στην Ελλάδα", Αθήνα, Εμπορική Τράπεζα της Ελλάδος, 1967.
- Edward Noel-Baker|"Looking at Greece", Philadelphia/New York, J.B.Lippincott Company.
- John Campbell K. / Philip Sherrard / Dimitri(Photography by), "Modern Greece", London/New York, Praeger, 1968. Ernest Benn Ltd, 1968.Clarendon Press/Oxford University Press, 1974 ISBN 9780195197563
- Σπύρος Βασιλείου, "Φώτα και σκιές", Αθήνα, S.Bontas, 1969.
- Hassan Fathy / Dimitri Papadimos (Photographs), "Gourna: A Tale of Two Villages", Cairo, Ministry of Culture, 1969.1989
- Hassan Fathy, "Construire avec le peuple", Paris, Jerome Martineau, 1970.Original from the University of Michigan Digitized 8 May 2007
- Hassan Fathy, "Architecture for the Poor", Chicago, London, The University of Chicago Press, 1973.
- Δημήτρης Παπαδήμος, "Η Ελλάδα που φεύγει", Αθήνα, Ολκός, 1974.
- Δημήτρης Παπαδήμος, "Η Ελλάδα που φεύγει", Αθήνα, Νέα Σύνορα/Λιβάνης, 1981.
- Δημήτρης Παπαδήμος, "Σπέτσες", έκδοση Τουριστικού Ομίλου Σπετσών, 1980.
- Εμμανουήλ Κάσδαγλης / Δημήτρης (φωτογραφίες), "Το αγλαότεχνο τυπογραφείο των αδελφών Ταρουσόπουλου", Αθήνα, ΄Αγρα, 1980.
- James Steel, "The Hassan Fathy Collection, a Catalogue of Visual Documents at the Aga Khan Award for Architecture", Bern, Aga Khan Trust of Culture, 1989.
- Ian MacNiven, "Lawrence Durrell, A Biography", London, Faber and Faber Ltd, 1998. ISBN 9780571172481
- Μαρία Στασινοπούλου, "Χρονολόγιο Εργογραφίας Γεώργου Σεφέρη (1900-1971)", Αθήνα, Μεταίχμιο, 2000.
- Ahmed Youssef, "Cocteau l'Egyptien", editions du Rocher/Jean Paul Bertrand, 2001.
- Κωστής Λιόντης (επιμ.), "Ο Φωτογράφος Δημήτρης Παπαδήμος", Επτά Ημέρες-Η Καθημερινή, 14.10.2001.
- "Η Ελλάδα στήν Ευρωπαϊκή Ένωση, 20 χρόνια συμμετοχής", Ευρωπαϊκή επιτροπή στήν Ελλάδα, Αθήνα, ΕΛΙΑ, 2001.
- Richard Clogg (επιμ.), "Bearing Gifts, Humanitarian Aide to Greece in 1940s", St.Anthony's College Oxford, Palgrave Macmillan, 2008.ISBN 9780230500358
- "Ethnographes et voyageurs, les defies de l'ecriture", Paris, Editions du comite des travaux historiques et scientifiques, 2008.
- Δημήτρης Παπαδήμος, "Αγιος Νικόλαος, τοποι και άνθρωποι στη δεκαετία του '60", Δήμος Αγίου Νικολάου Κρήτης, Ίδρυμα Γ&Α Μαμιδάκη, 2008.
- "Ιστορία του Ελληνικού Έθνους", 4π Ειδικές Εκδόσεις National Geographic, 2010.
- "Λαϊκό τραγούδι:η αυθεντική ιστορία", 4π Ειδικές Εκδόσεις National Geographic, 2010.
