= Buildings of Nuffield College, Oxford =

Coordinates: 51°45′10.2″N 1°15′46.5″W

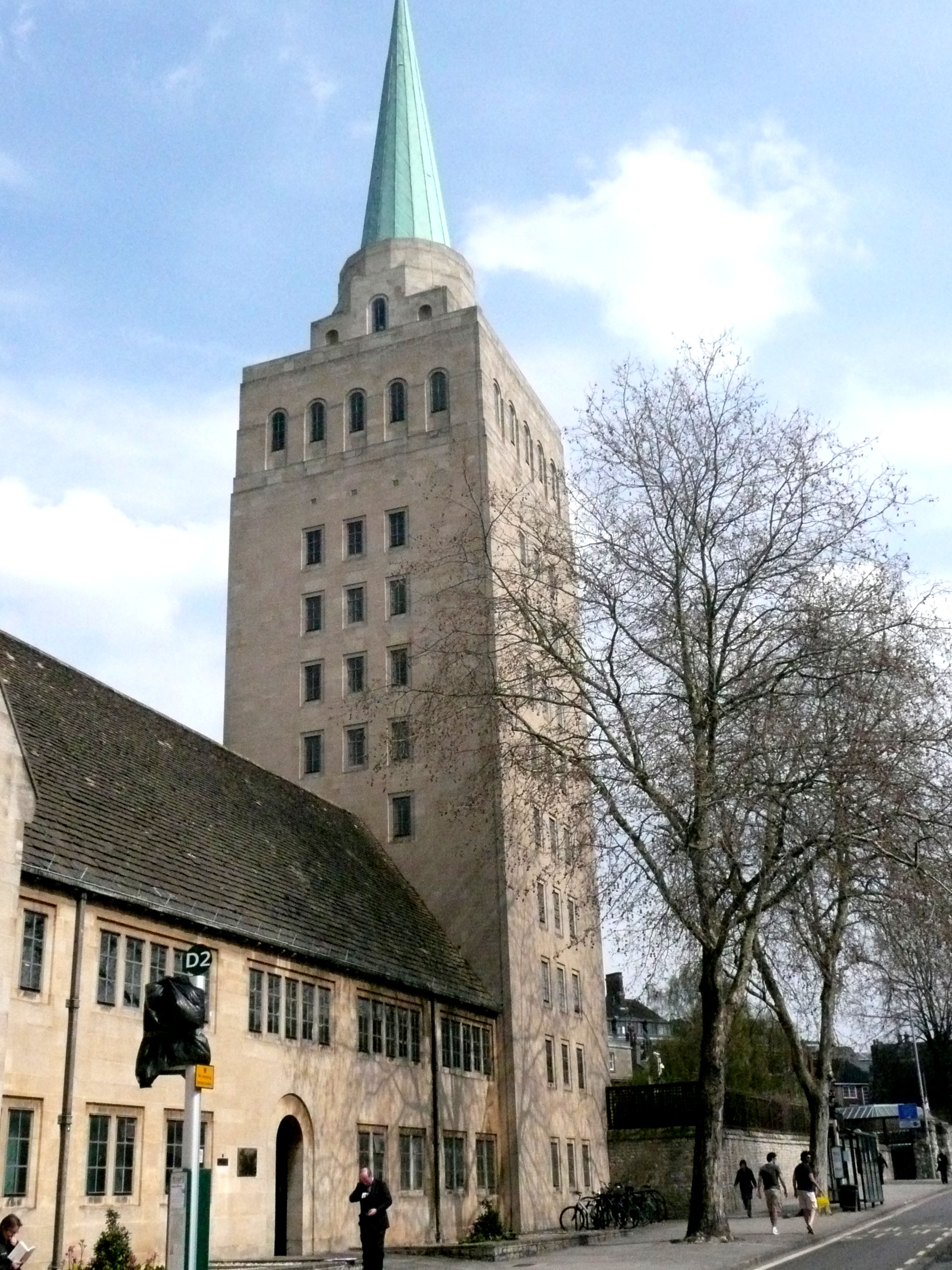
Nuffield College, facing New Road, with the library tower topped by a flèche. The main entrance to the college is in the middle of the building to the left of the tower.

The buildings of Nuffield College, one of the colleges of the University of Oxford, are to the west of the city centre of Oxford, England, and stand on the site of the basin of the Oxford Canal. Nuffield College was founded in 1937 after a donation to the University by the car manufacturer Lord Nuffield; he gave land for the college, as well as £900,000 (approximately £246 million in present-day terms) to build and endow it. The architect Austen Harrison, who had worked in Greece and Palestine, was appointed by the University to design the buildings. His initial design, heavily influenced by Mediterranean architecture, was rejected by Nuffield, who called it "un-English" and refused to allow his name to be associated with it. Harrison reworked the plans, aiming for "something on the lines of Cotswold domestic architecture", as Nuffield wanted.

Construction of the second design began in 1949 and was finished in 1960. Progress was hampered by post-war building restrictions, and the effects of inflation on Nuffield's donation led to various cost-saving changes to the plans. In one change, the tower, which had been planned to be ornamental, was redesigned to hold the college's library. It was the first tower built in Oxford for 200 years and is about 150 feet (46 m) tall, including the flèche on top. The buildings are arranged around two quadrangles, with residential accommodation for students and fellows in one, and the hall, library and administrative offices in the other. The chapel has stained glass windows designed by John Piper.

The architectural historian Sir Howard Colvin said that Harrison's first design was Oxford's "most notable architectural casualty of the 1930s"; it has also been described as a "missed opportunity" to show that Oxford did not live "only in the past". Reaction to the architecture of the college has been largely unfavourable. In the 1960s, it was described as "Oxford's biggest monument to barren reaction". The tower has been described as "ungainly", and marred by repetitive windows. The travel writer Jan Morris wrote that the college was "a hodge-podge from the start". However, the architectural historian Sir Nikolaus Pevsner, although unimpressed with most of the college, thought that the tower helped the Oxford skyline and predicted it would "one day be loved". The writer Simon Jenkins doubted Pevsner's prediction, and claimed that "vegetation" was the "best hope" for the tower – as well as the rest of the college.

== Lord Nuffield's donation ==
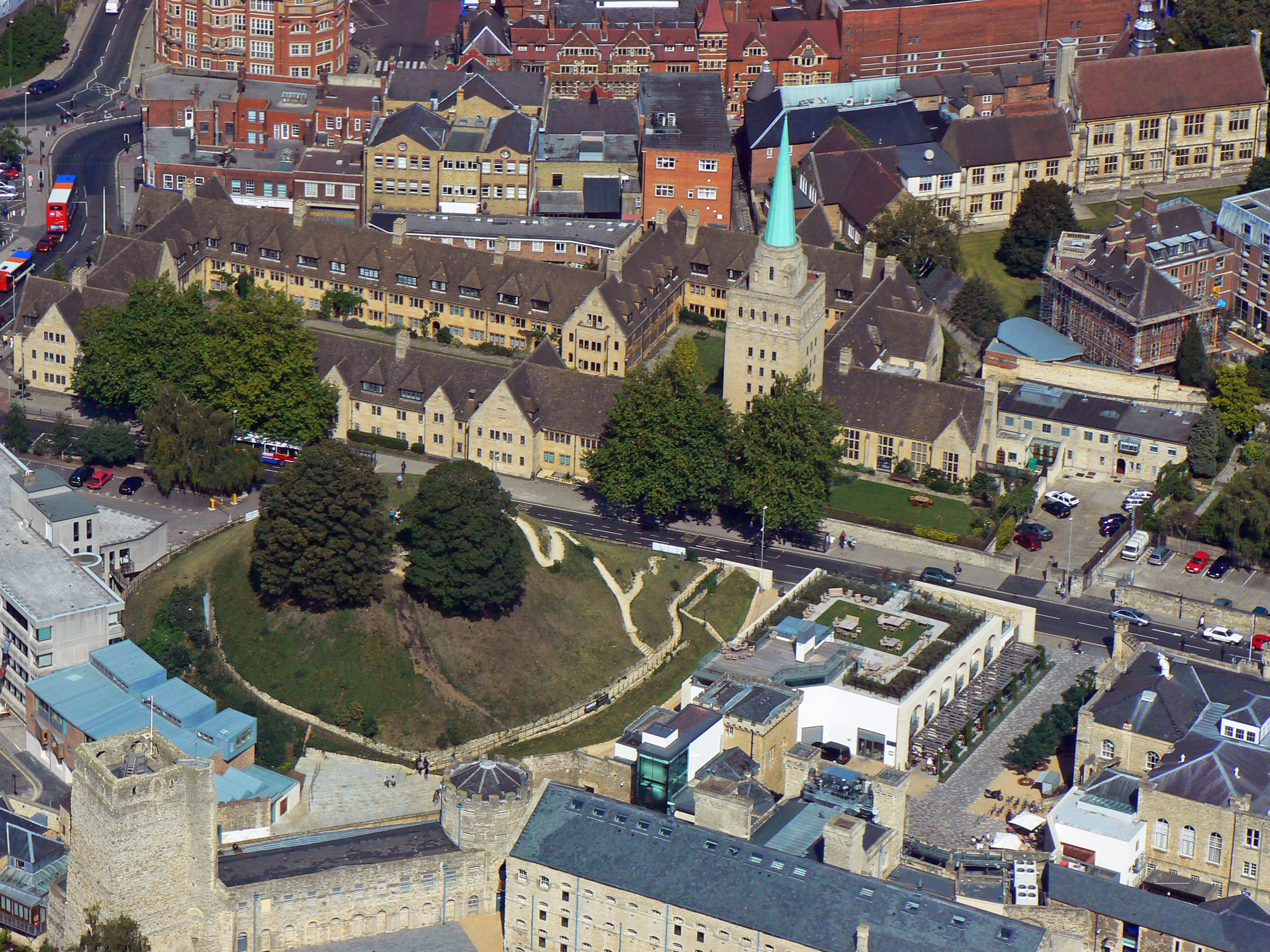
Nuffield College from the air, facing Oxford Castle

The history of Nuffield College dates from 16 November 1937, when the university entered a Deed of Covenant and Trust with Lord Nuffield. Nuffield, known as William Morris before he was raised to the peerage, was an industrialist and the founder of Morris Motors, which was based in Cowley, east Oxford. For the creation of Nuffield College and for his other donations (which included funding a chair of Spanish studies and donating £2 million in 1936 (Note: £2M in 1936 would be worth approximately £774M in today's terms, adjusting for changes in GDP.) for a school of medical research), he was described in 1949 by an editorial in The Times as "the greatest benefactor of the University since the Middle Ages". He donated land on New Road, to the west of the city centre near the mound of Oxford Castle, on the site of the largely disused basin of the Oxford Canal. In 1937, The Times described the half-mile between the railway station and the city (an area including the site of the proposed college) as "something between a refuse heap and a slum"; Nuffield had originally bought the canal basin to beautify that part of the city before he had the idea of building a college to accomplish this. As well as the land, Nuffield gave £900,000 (Note: £900,000 in 1937 would be worth approximately £325M in today's terms, adjusting for changes in GDP.) to build the college and to provide it with an endowment fund.

His plan was to create a college that specialised in engineering and business methods to provide a link between academia and industry, for which he initially offered the University £1 million; (Note: £1M in 1937 would be worth approximately £362M in today's terms, adjusting for changes in GDP.) £100,000 (Note: £100,000 in 1937 would be worth approximately £36.2M in today's terms, adjusting for changes in GDP.) was used for a physical chemistry laboratory (completed in 1941), of which he approved. However, although he was persuaded to put the remainder towards a college for social science studies instead, he still felt "cheated". He later described the college as "that bloody Kremlin", "where left-wingers study at my expense". He was sufficiently pleased with the work of the college to leave it most of his remaining fortune (which was more than £3 million) when he died in 1963, although most of the bequest did not reach the college as it was needed to pay inheritance tax on Nuffield's estate.

== First design ==
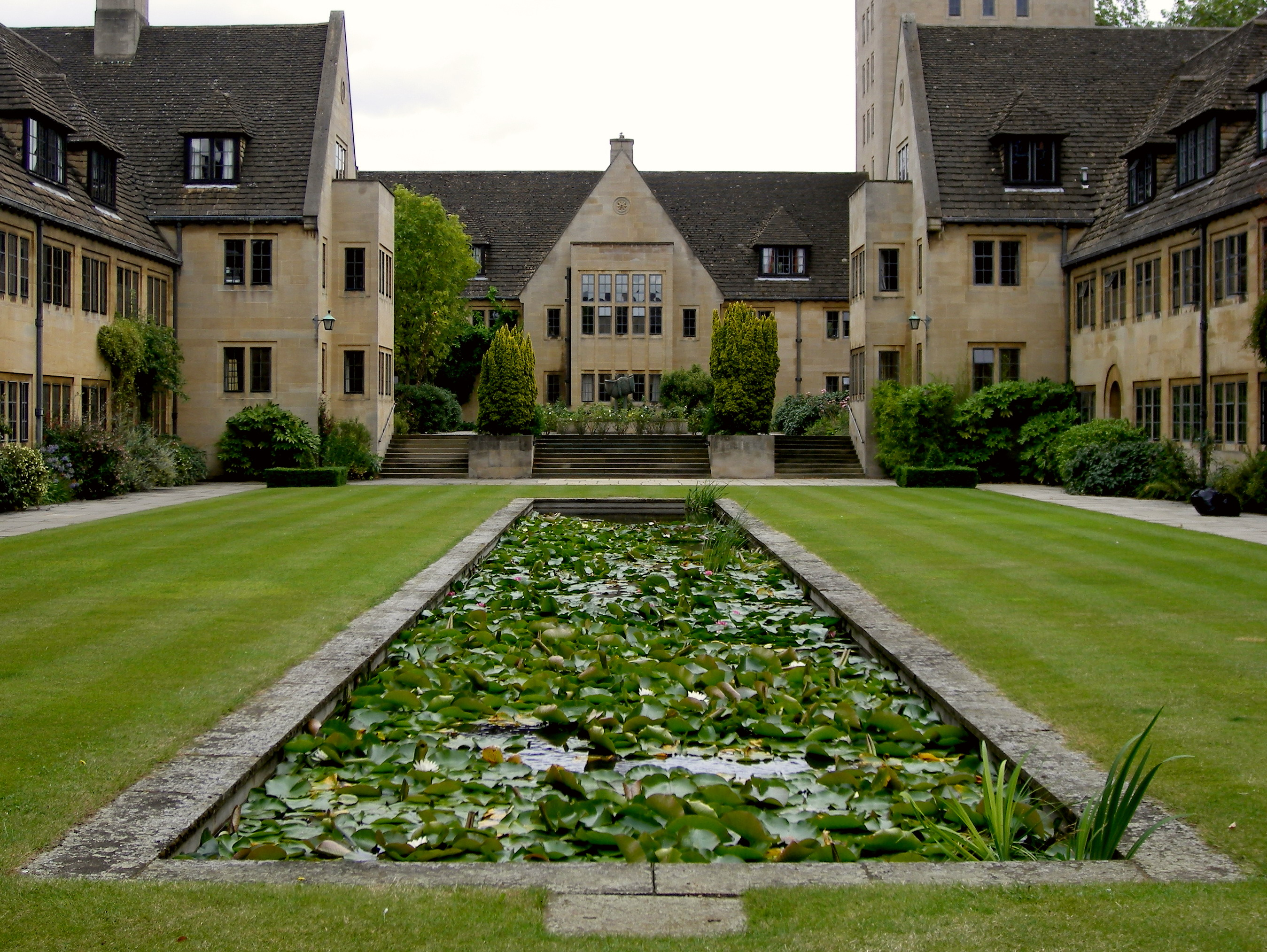
The pool in the lower quadrangle, looking east towards the upper quadrangle and the hall

Administration of Nuffield's donation was the responsibility of the University, as the college did not become an independent body until after the Second World War. A sub-committee, consisting of three heads of Oxford colleges (Sir William Beveridge from University College; Alfred Emden from St Edmund Hall; and Linda Grier from Lady Margaret Hall), was appointed to choose the architect; Emden appears to have played the major part in the group's work. Eight architects were initially asked to compete, including Louis de Soissons, Vincent Harris, Austen Harrison, Charles Holden, Edward Maufe, and Hubert Worthington. All but Holden and Maufe submitted photographs of their work, and the sub-committee then recommended Harrison, a decision confirmed after he was interviewed on 17 June 1938. At that time, Harrison had never worked in Britain: although he had qualified there, he had practised in Greece and Palestine. Indeed, the college seems to have been his only project in the country, and remains his best known work, along with his later University of Ghana. Harrison was not given any restrictions or limitations on style; Nuffield agreed to Harrison's appointment, but was not consulted on the architectural style of the college before Harrison started work. When Nuffield's donation was announced, it was reported that the "general idea" was that the college buildings should be sited behind gardens, similar to the memorial gardens at Christ Church, Oxford, so that those entering Oxford from the west would be faced with a "beautiful vista of well-planned gardens seen through railings"; this idea did not form part of Harrison's designs.

After Harrison's preliminary studies, it became clear that the proposed site could not contain a college and an institute for social science research as planned; Nuffield agreed to provide an additional plot of land on the opposite side of Worcester Street. Harrison proposed to build the college on the main site, with the institute on the second site. The hall was to be at the east end of the main site, aligned east to west, with a tower at the west end; the upper quadrangle, to the immediate west of the hall and aligned north to south, would have the Warden's Lodging at the north end and the chapel at the south end; steps would lead down from the upper quadrangle into the lower quadrangle, again aligned east to west, with the main entrance at the far east end of the lower quadrangle. The proposed institute would face the main college entrance across Worcester Street. The sub-committee recommended that Harrison's plans be adopted in January 1939, and a model of the design was shown to Nuffield in June 1939 – he had been abroad for much of the intervening period.

Part of Harrison's first design of 1939; the view from the west end of the lower quadrangle, looking towards the upper quadrangle with the tower over the entrance to the hall

Harrison's design had "little that was English, still less that was recognisably Oxonian", said the architectural historian Sir Howard Colvin. There were no pitched roofs, battlements, or pinnacles. Instead, the proposed building had "a strongly Mediterranean character", inspired by medieval buildings in that region. White Portland stone was the chosen building material; there were to be "stark" external walls and flat roofs, and a large semi-circular doorway at the main entrance, with facetted voussoirs demonstrating the influence of the Muslim architecture of Norman Sicily. The tower, which was to have an internal dome and an external polygonal design, showed (in Colvin's view) influences of Byzantium and parts of southern France. In the hall, there were to be aisles on the north and south sides of the main body of the hall, as in a basilica, with the arches and columns of the aisles designed in a Greek Doric style. The hall and its grand staircase, said Colvin, would have rivalled those of Christ Church. Although Harrison had not finished plans for the common rooms, the initial sketches had oriental touches, including fireplaces reminiscent of the Topkapı Palace in Istanbul. The Warden's Lodging would have been "one of the most handsome and commodious of its kind". However, Colvin thought that the chapel design was better suited to Mediterranean sunlight than Oxford gloom.

Colvin said that the "relationship between the principal buildings" was "elegantly worked out" and, "in a university of self-contained spaces", a design using two intersecting axes – one from the entrance to the hall and tower, the other from the chapel to the lodging – "represented an innovation in planning that was highly effective". Colvin's view was that the failure to construct the college according to this "impressive" design led to it being Oxford's "most notable architectural casualty of the 1930s". Had it been built, he said, it "would have taken its place among the major architectural monuments of Oxford".

== Second design ==
Harrison's second design of 1939, showing the proposed buildings for an institute of social science research on the left (which were never built). Financial constraints led to further changes being made during construction.

Nuffield was dismayed by the model of Harrison's plans, as the buildings were not in the general Oxford collegiate style that he was known to favour. After a meeting with the University's Vice-Chancellor, A. D. Lindsay, Nuffield wrote to him on 15 August 1939 to say that he felt "obliged to adhere to my adverse judgement of the plans". The design was "un-English and out of keeping with the best tradition of Oxford architecture", said Nuffield, adding that "if a building of this type were to be erected, I would not allow my name to be associated therewith".

Harrison protested that the so-called Oxford architectural tradition was a vague concept and also an accident of history: there was no uniform style uniting the buildings of the university and colleges, but instead different designs had been used, with varying modifications, over many centuries. Only a compromise would suit "a 20th century donor with an industrial background who sighs for romance, a committee of economists who are after results [and] the governing committee of a University steeped in its tradition". Nevertheless, Harrison agreed to attempt to satisfy Nuffield's desire for "something on the lines of Cotswold domestic architecture", and produced a second design. The amount of accommodation provided was reduced. The main entrance was moved from the west to the south of the college, under the chapel; it was to have an arcaded vestibule, allowing the quadrangle to be seen from the street, as Nuffield wanted. The flat roofs were replaced with pitched roofs with gable ends and dormer windows. The staircase leading to the hall was removed, and the hall repositioned on ground level, without aisles but with a hammerbeam roof of oak trusses. The tower, which would now contain the common room, was moved from the area of the former hall staircase to the east end of the chapel. When the plans were shown to Nuffield in early 1940, the only change that he requested before giving his approval was for a "more conventional" tower to replace the spire on Harrison's design.

== Construction and completion ==
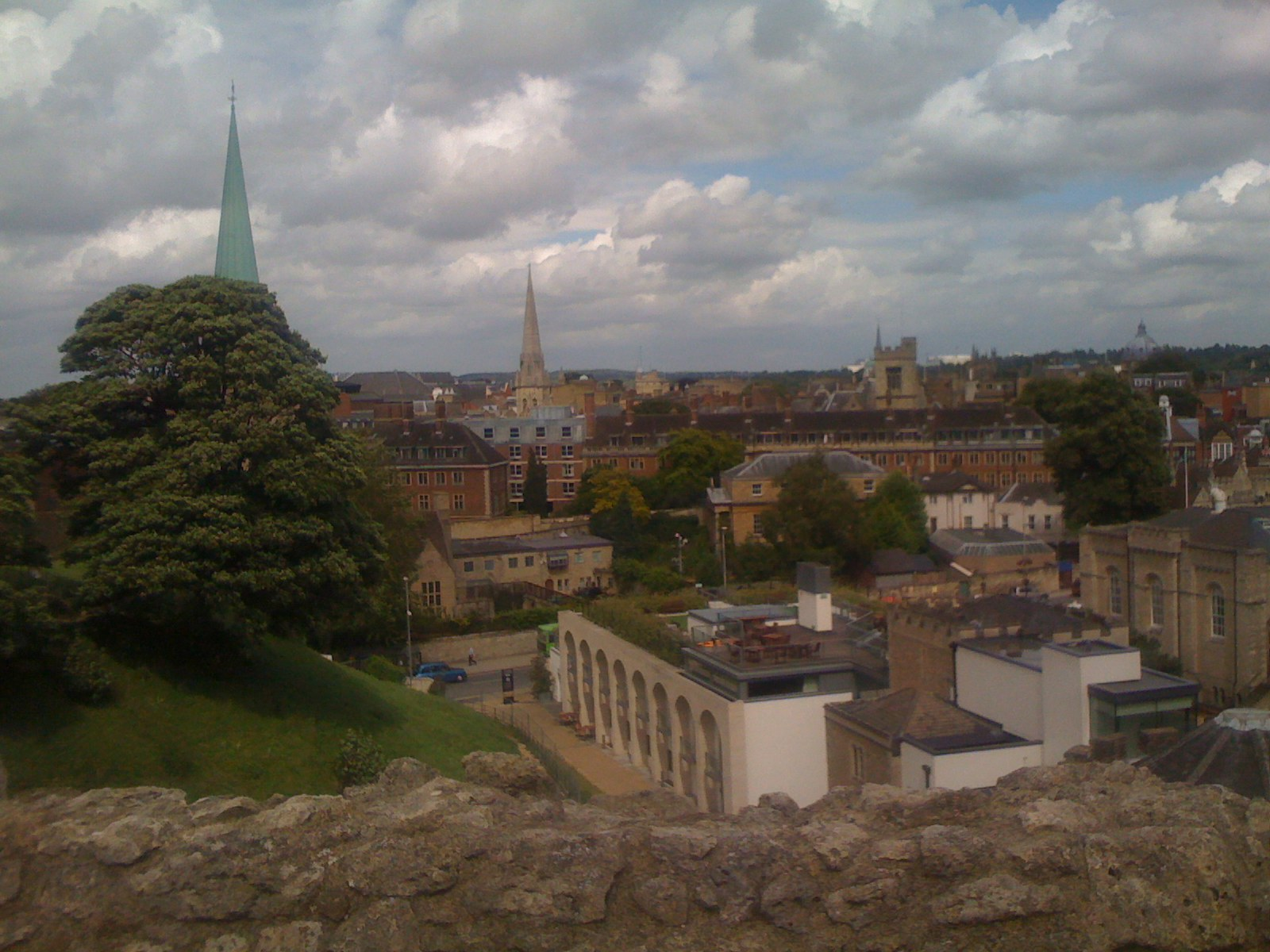
View from the tower of Oxford Castle, with the Nuffield flèche rising above the tree at left

The Second World War meant that construction work on the main college buildings could not begin until 21 April 1949, when the foundation stone was laid; work on the warden's residence had begun in October 1948. Before the buildings were erected, the college operated from rented houses elsewhere in Oxford, on Banbury Road and Woodstock Road. There were further changes to Harrison's second design, as not only had inflation between 1937 and 1949 reduced the value of Nuffield's original donation, but additional savings had to be made in the difficult post-war economic situation. A scale model, created in 1949 as work started, showed the alterations: a shortened tower, a plainer main entrance, and no arcades within the quadrangles. Further changes were made once work was under way, including the indefinite postponement of construction of the institute opposite the college. The plans of the tower were altered so that it would hold a library, instead of being purely ornamental, windows were added at regular intervals, and it was topped by a copper flèche, or small spire.

A further delay in construction was announced in 1951, when labour and materials were restricted because of a government rearmament drive. Work to complete the quadrangle, including a hall, kitchen and the library tower, began in 1955 at a cost of £200,000. (Note: £200,000 in 1955 would be worth approximately £19M in today's terms, adjusting for changes in GDP.) This money was donated to the college by the Nuffield Foundation upon Lord Nuffield's recommendation. Until it was required for books, the fellows of the college used the upper floor as a Senior Common Room. The tower was completed in 1956, and the college as a whole (without the institute on the site opposite, which is now used as a car park) was finished in 1960. Work was still under way when the college was incorporated by royal charter in 1958, thereby becoming a self-governing entity. The charter was presented to the college by the Duke of Edinburgh on 6 June 1958, at the first lunch to be served in the hall.

Colvin commented that, apart from the flèche which was similar to the initial plan, the college as finally built contained none of the elements that had given Harrison's first design "interest and distinction". The remaining "vestiges" of the first plan, he said, were the two main axes within the college, although "no longer focussed on major architectural incidents", and the masonry around the main doors, cut to resemble the buildings of medieval Italy rather than those of Tudor England.

== Buildings ==
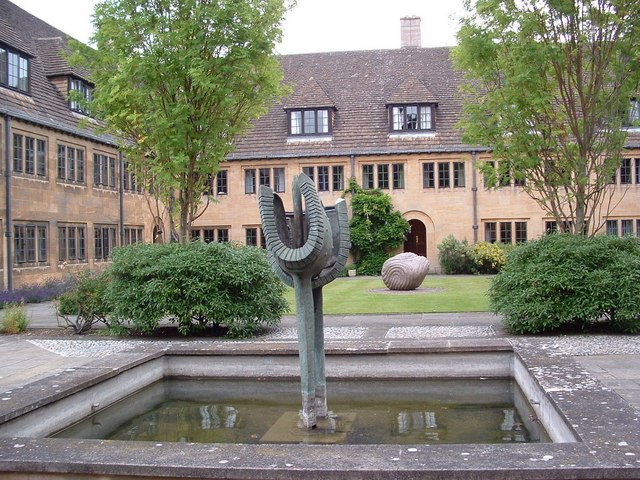
The pool in the upper quadrangle

The college presents a symmetrical front to New Road and the castle mound, with four small gables between a larger gable at either end. There are two quadrangles, with steps leading down from the upper quadrangle (to the east) to the lower quadrangle (to the west). Residential accommodation for students and fellows is located in the lower quadrangle, whilst the hall, library, and administrative offices are in the upper quadrangle. The buildings are two storeys high, with dormers above. There are pools in the centre of the quadrangles (the one in the lower quadrangle is the longer of the two); the writer Simon Jenkins said that these are "almost puddles", and saw them as relics of Harrison's Mediterranean plan. The writer Peter Sager, however, thought that the pond represents the canal basin that previously occupied the site. The main entrance leads into the upper quadrangle, which has the hall on its east side. The square-mullioned windows facing the quadrangles are arranged in close-set groups of three; at the east end of the upper quadrangle, the common room has a larger bay window. An abstract sculpture by Hubert Dalwood, from 1962, has been positioned on the lawn inside the college. Dalwood also designed the fountain in the pool in the upper quadrangle, although his plan for a spray of water was not implemented, "leaving the sculpture with no obvious purpose".

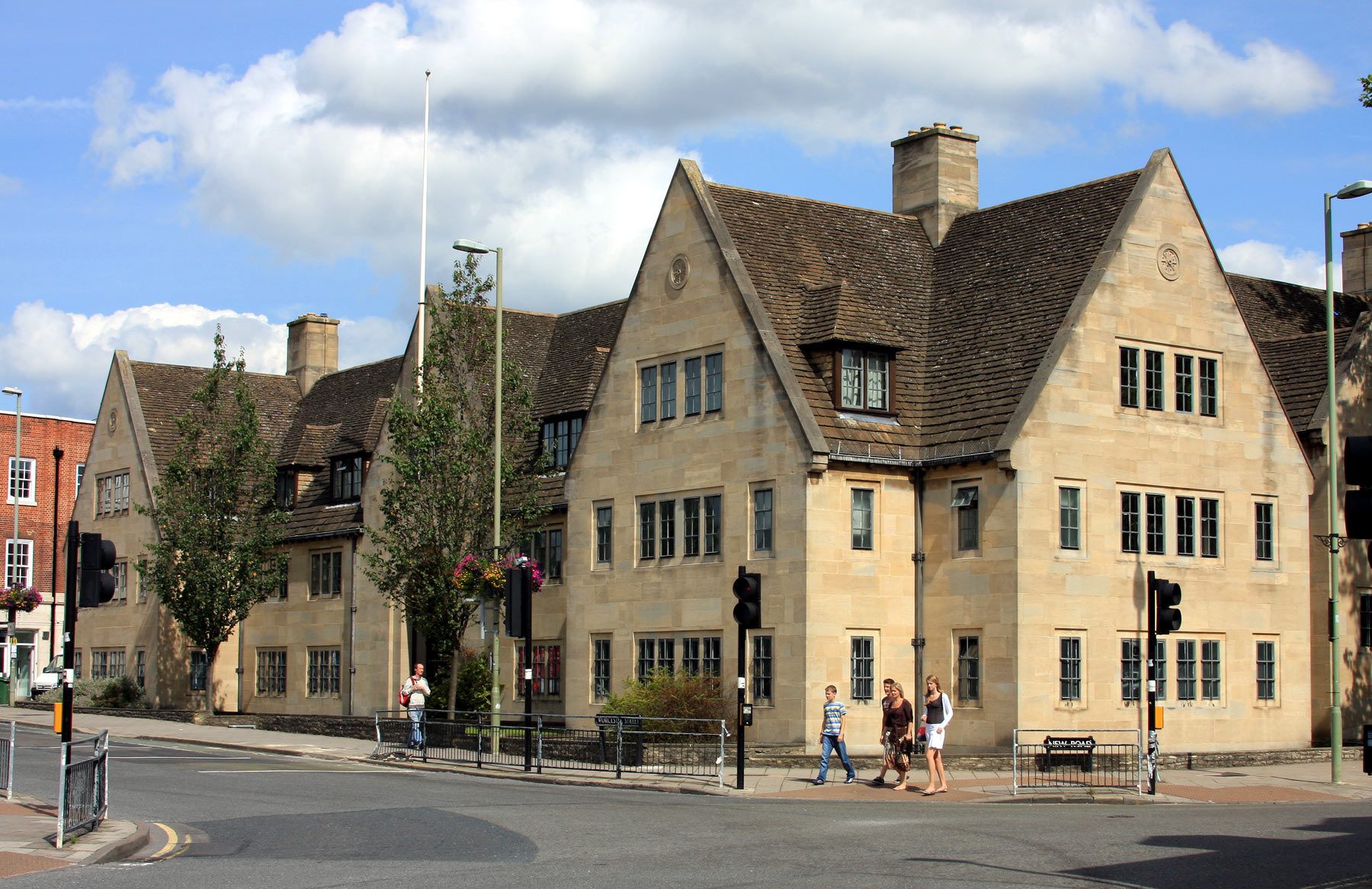
The corner of New Road (right) and Worcester Street (left)

The hall has a floor of black and white marble and arches made of concrete supporting an oak roof with red panels. The furniture in the hall was designed by, and the chairs were built by, Edward Barnsley. Lord Nuffield's coat of arms are displayed over the fireplace, carved from a single piece of stone, and his portrait, painted by Sir Arthur Cope, hangs in the hall. The roofs are finished with Collyweston stone slates from Northamptonshire. Many other Oxford colleges are roofed with Stonesfield stone slate from a quarry 10 miles (16 km) northwest of Oxford, but these were no longer available when Nuffield was built. The main building stone used is Clipsham stone. The tower, which has nine floors, is about 90 feet (27 m) tall, with the flèche taking the total height to about 150 feet (46 m). It was the first tower built in Oxford for 200 years. Work was carried out in the library in 1999 to extend the total shelf-length to just under 6 kilometres (3.7 mi). The library contains paintings of "Spring" and "Winter" by Derrick Greaves and "Summer" and "Autumn" by Edward Middleditch.

The Chapel, located in an attic space on the south side of the College, can seat forty people. It was decorated and fitted out under the direction of the artist John Piper prior to dedication on 13 December 1961 by the then Bishop of Oxford, Dr Harry Carpenter. The stained glass windows were designed by Piper and made by his regular collaborator, the glassmaker Patrick Reyntiens. The largest of these is a three-light window in the north wall, which faces the altar orientated to the south. The window depicts the Five Wounds of Christ, with the feet, hands and heart isolated and drawn in outline with the only colour being gashes of red blood. At either end of the Chapel are opposing recesses in the east and west walls, each with a two-light window with an abstract design. Those towards the north wall are vividly coloured in reds, blues and golds. Those towards the south are in paler hues. Piper was also responsible for the design of the altar table, pews and candlesticks. The sculptor John Hoskin made the bronze reredos and cross, and the golden curtain behind the altar was woven by students at the Royal College of Art.

== Assessment ==
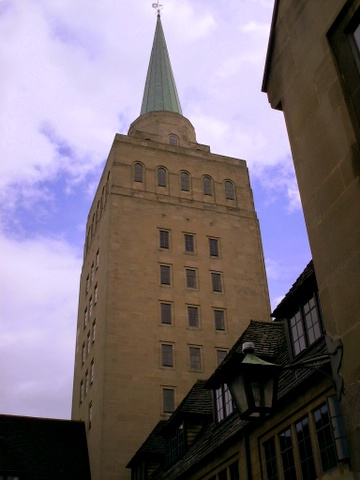
The tower, variously described as "exciting", "mighty", "ungainly", "clumsy" and "grotesque"

The architectural writer Geoffrey Tyack has written that Nuffield College was Oxford's "most important architectural project of the immediate post-war years". Opinions about the architecture merits of the college have varied, although most have been unfavourable. The authors of a 1961 booklet on the architecture of modern Oxford said that it was "Oxford's biggest monument to barren reaction". The Cotswold style was "taken absurdly out of context and mercilessly stretched", and did not "harmonise with the clumsy tower", whilst the spire "[perched] uneasily ... despite its elaborate base". An unnamed journalist wrote in The Times in 1959 that the main buildings of the quadrangles were "somewhat oddly wedded to small basins which irresistibly suggest a Lilliputian Versailles". The same writer said that the tower rose "Manhattan-wise for 10 storeys through the twentieth century, only to have a diminutive spire, escaped from the fifteenth, push through its top to steal the last laugh". Peter Sager, too, thought that the "high-rise library" could "easily stand on the Hudson". Sir Howard Colvin said that the "utilitarian function" of the tower "accorded ill with its original ornamental purpose", and that the architects had "failed to find a satisfactory solution" to the "repetitive uniformity of fenestration". Of the flèche, Colvin said that it "makes its contribution to the Oxford skyline without any overt reference to historical precedent". Geoffrey Tyack also disliked the tower, describing it as "an ungainly structure" that was "lit by a monotonous array of windows punched out of the wall surface"; however, he thought the hall was "an effective reinterpretation of the traditional collegiate pattern".

The architectural historian Sir Nikolaus Pevsner compared the college unfavourably to the designs of the Danish architect Arne Jacobsen for St Catherine's College, Oxford, construction of which began in 1960 (the year that Nuffield College was completed): St Catherine's, in his view, was "the most perfect piece of architecture of 20th-century Oxford" and made Nuffield "look even more absurd". Nevertheless, he "proposed forgiveness" for the "mighty tower", which "positively helps the famous skyline of Oxford", adding that it has "enough identity to be sure that one day it will find affection". He said that the tower had something of the architect Edwin Lutyens' "felicitous manipulation of period details into a non-period whole and will, I prophesy, one day be loved", although he was less sure that this fate awaited the rest of the buildings. Simon Jenkins said of Pevsner's prophecy about the tower, "I doubt it"; he described it as "at best ungainly", with a "weak spire", and said that "vegetation was its best hope, as for the rest of Nuffield". The college, in his view "required a sense of humour".

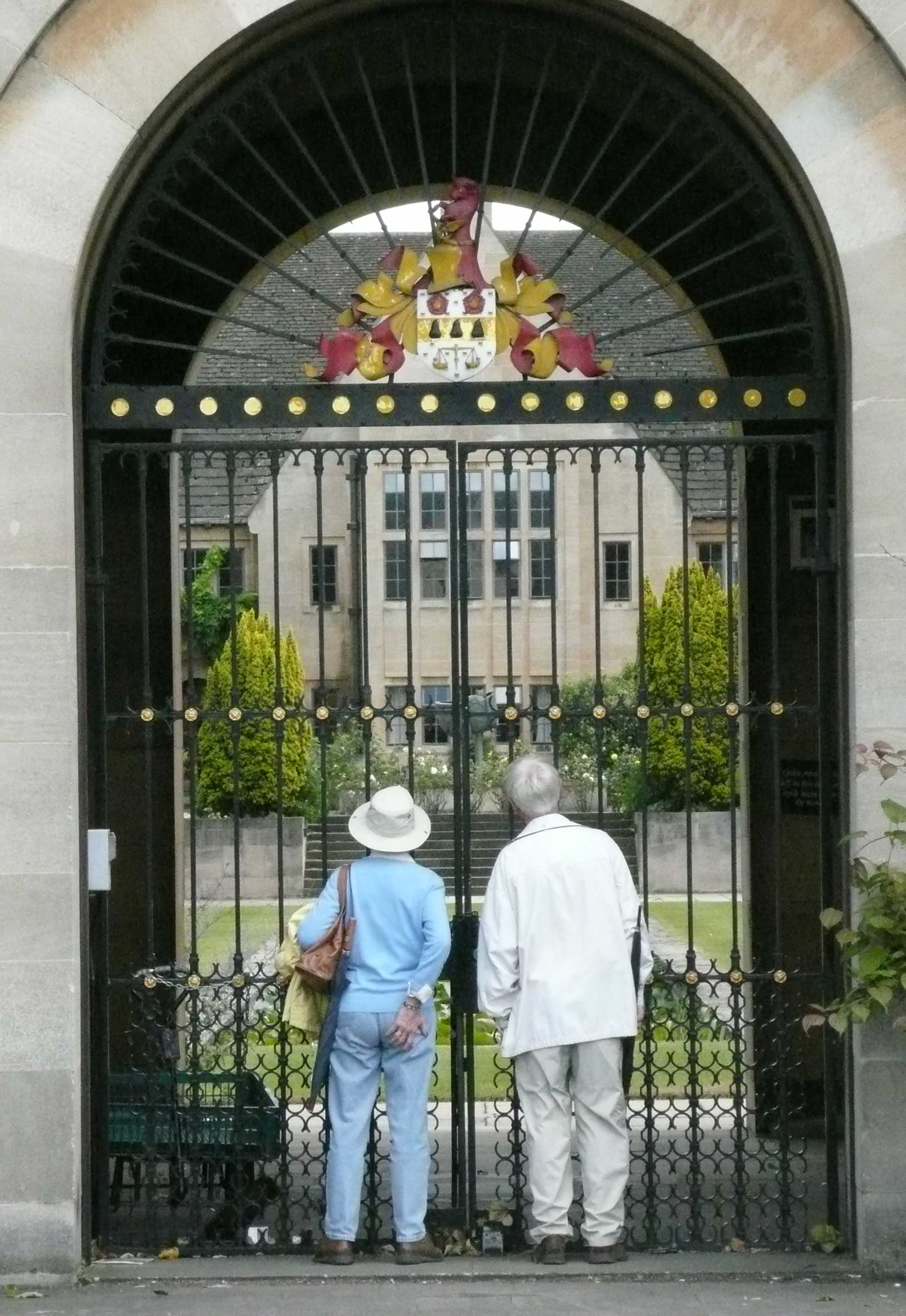
Looking through the west gate into the lower quadrangle

Writing in 1952, after the first section of the buildings was complete, J. M. Richards, the editor of the Architectural Review, said that Nuffield was "a large-scale example of period-style architecture which has no justification whatever on grounds of consideration for the neighbours and represents missed opportunity of a really tragic kind". As the site was away from the "ancient colleges" of the city centre and in an area of "undistinguished nineteenth century commercial building", there had been a "rare opportunity" of building something "belonging ... to the twentieth century, and of showing that Oxford does not live only in the past". He said that the "compromise between contemporary needs and what is imagined to be the English collegiate tradition is quite unworthy of the educational enterprise the new foundation represents". He was, however, "thankful" that the building used smooth-faced stone "in the proper Oxford style" rather than rubble facing, which he said had been used elsewhere in Oxford "with extraordinarily unpleasing results".

The architectural correspondent of The Times wrote that the architecture of the college was incongruous – it was "remarkable" that a college with connections to modern industry should be looking backwards in this way. "That a college devoted to modern scientific studies should be dressed up [in the style of an antique Cotswold manor house] has already been the subject of puzzled comment by many foreign visitors to Oxford." Writing in The Observer, Patience Gray also disliked the college's design, referring to the "Cotswold dementia" of the architecture, and the college's "pokey windows and grotesque sugarloaf tower." The chapel was described by the travel writer Jan Morris as "one of the sweetest little sanctuaries in Oxford"; "very simple, almost stern" with a contrast between the black and white pews and the "rich colour" of the stained glass. However, she said that whilst Oxford colleges change in style over time as buildings are added or altered, "Nuffield was a hodge-podge from the start, with a faintly Levantine tower upon a Cotswold Gothic base".

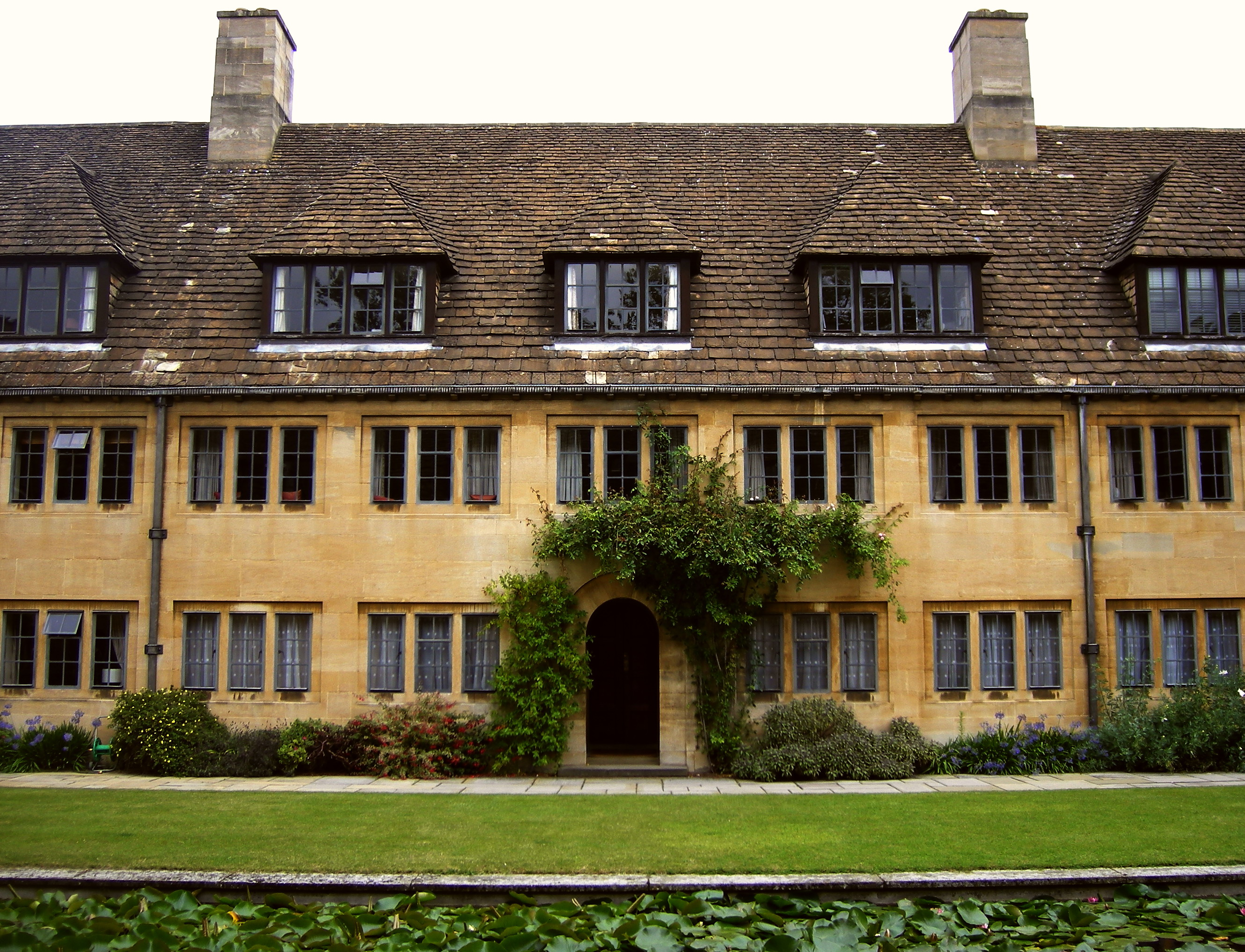
Rooms in the lower quadrangle

The writer Miles Jebb considered the contrast between the hall's black and white floor and red-panelled roof to be "most effective". He thought that the enclosed layout of the college was "a principal attraction", but wrote that the tower's "palpably utilitarian function detracts from its aesthetic attraction", even though it made the "emphatic addition" to the skyline of Oxford that Nuffield wanted. A. R. Woolley, author of an Oxford University Press guide to the city and university, was more positive. He described the tower as "an exciting breakaway from the conventional", with its spire as a "secular contribution to the sky-line". He said that the buildings "make a picturesque group of gabled Cotswold roofs", adding that "[t]heir design is simple and depends for its effects upon its just proportions. It is at once traditional and original."

In 1993, the college became a Grade II listed building, a designation given to buildings of national importance and special interest. The kerbstones around the pool in the west quadrangle have been given separate Grade II listing, as an "integral part of the Nuffield College scheme".

== See also ==
- Buildings of Jesus College, Oxford

== Notes and references ==
=== Notes ===
Monetary values are inflated to contemporary values using changes in the British Gross Domestic Product (GDP). This measures the social cost of construction or investment as a proportion of the economy's total output of goods and services, showing the equivalent social impact in current terms: how much contemporary Britons would need to forgo in order to invest a similar amount of the current British economy. As of January 2017, the latest year for which contemporary figures are available is 2015.

=== Bibliography ===
- Colvin, Sir Howard (1983). Unbuilt Oxford. Yale University Press. ISBN 0-300-03126-2.
- Harrison, Brian, ed. (1994). The History of the University of Oxford Volume 8: The Twentieth Century. Oxford University Press. ISBN 978-0-19-822974-2.
- Hibbert, Christopher, ed. (1992). "Nuffield College". The Encyclopaedia of Oxford. Pan Macmillan. ISBN 0-333-48614-5.
- Jebb, Miles (1996). The Colleges of Oxford. Constable. ISBN 0-09-476160-4.
- Jenkins, Simon (2009). England's Thousand Best Houses. Penguin Books. p. 686. ISBN 978-0-14-103929-9.
- Loveday, Alexander (1954). "Nuffield College". In Salter, H. E.; Lobel, Mary D. (eds.). A History of the County of Oxford Volume III – The University of Oxford. Victoria County History. Institute of Historical Research, University of London. p. 354. ISBN 978-0-7129-1064-4.
- Morris, Jan (2001). Oxford. Oxford University Press. ISBN 978-0-19-280136-4. "jan morris oxford."
- Pevsner, Nikolaus; Sherwood, Jennifer (1974). "Nuffield College". Oxfordshire. The Buildings of England. Yale University Press. ISBN 0-300-09639-9.
- Sager, Peter (2005). Oxford & Cambridge: An Uncommon History. Thames & Hudson. ISBN 978-0-500-51249-4.
- Smith, David L., ed. (1961). New Oxford: A guide to the modern city. Oxford University Design Society. OCLC 255123538.
- Tyack, Geoffrey (1998). Oxford: an architectural guide. Oxford University Press. ISBN 978-0-19-817423-3.
- Woolley, A. R. (1983). "Nuffield College". The Clarendon Guide to Oxford (5th ed.). Oxford University Press. ISBN 0-19-285129-2.
