= Ministry for Reconstruction (Greece) =

The Ministry for Reconstruction (or Ministry of Housing and Reconstruction) (Greek: Υπουργείο Ανοικοδόμησης) was a government department of Greece founded after World War II.

The ministry is now defunct.

== List of ministers ==
Name	Took office	Left office	Party
Konstantinos Apostolos Doxiadis	1945	1948	

There was also a Ministry of Reconstruction for Eastern Macedonia during World War I preceding the above Greek ministry.

== See also ==
- Cabinet of Greece
