= Jerusalem Boulevard, Jaffa =

Coordinates: 32°3′0.22″N 34°45′31.93″E

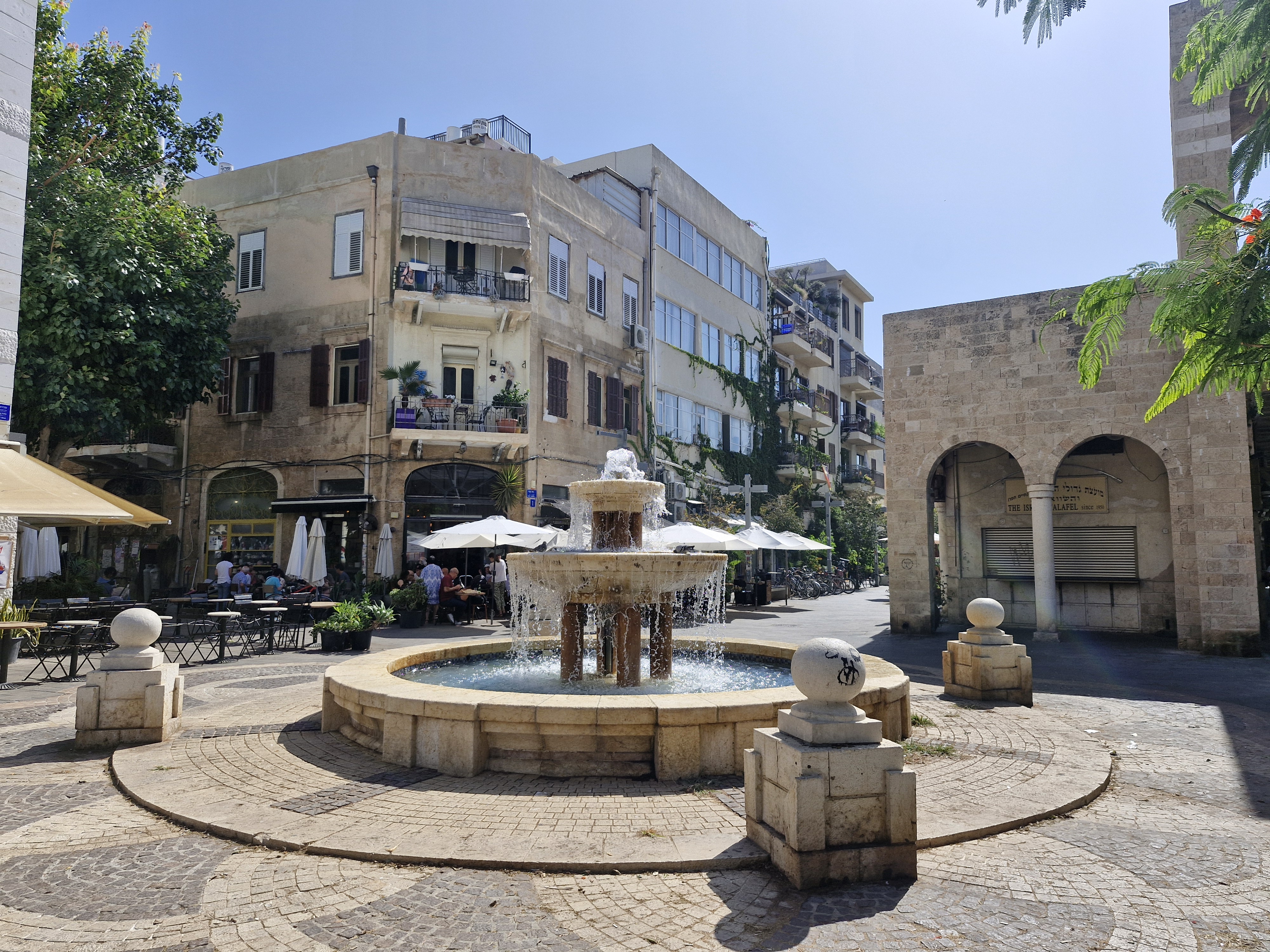
Fountain across from building that served as Jaffa city hall

Jerusalem Boulevard (Hebrew: Sderot Yerushalayim) (Hebrew: שדרות ירושלים), is a long historical avenue that crosses the city of Jaffa parallel to the shoreline a few hundred meters to the west, from the border of Tel Aviv to Bat Yam in the south (Sderot HaAtsma'ut) to the Yehezkel Kaufmann Street in the north, where it continues as a boulevard to the beach.

== History ==
=== British Mandate ===
Soon after being appointed governor in 1914, Hassan Bey, also known as Hassan Bek, adopted a development programme for Jaffa that included the construction of an avenue connecting the seaside city with the orange groves at its outskirts. In 1915, during World War I, Hassan Bey paved the street using forced Jewish and Arab labor and named it Jamal Pasha Boulevard after his superior, the Ottoman governor of Greater Syria.

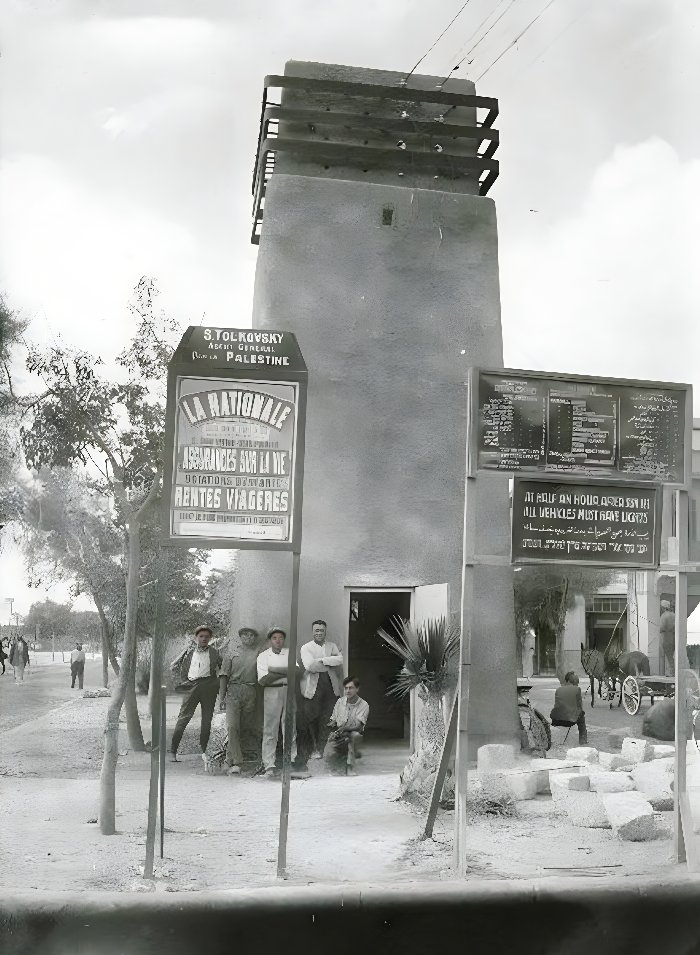
A transformer station designed by architect Richard Kauffmann in 1924

In 1915, Jewish engineer Gedalyahu Wilbushewitz, the brother of Manya Shochat, was appointed Jaffa's director of public works by Sultan Mehmed V. Under Wilbushewitz' supervision the new thoroughfare was built and lined with Washingtonia palm trees, ficus trees (sycomore and Chinese banyan), delivered by the Mikveh Yisrael agricultural school and planted by its students. In late 1917, British imperial troops occupied Jaffa and the avenue was renamed King George V Boulevard after the British monarch.

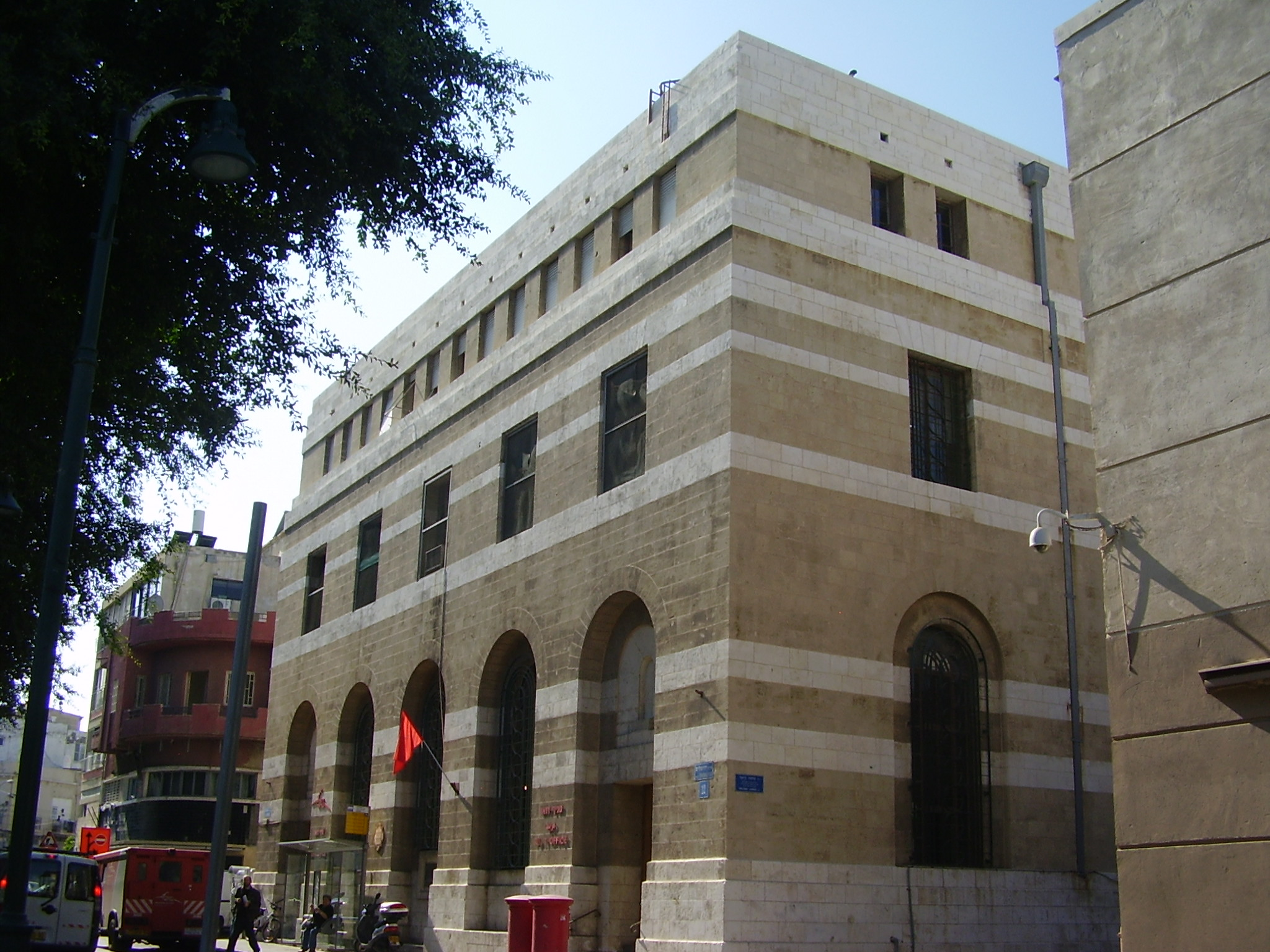
The central Post House of Jaffa designed by architect Austen Harrison in 1931

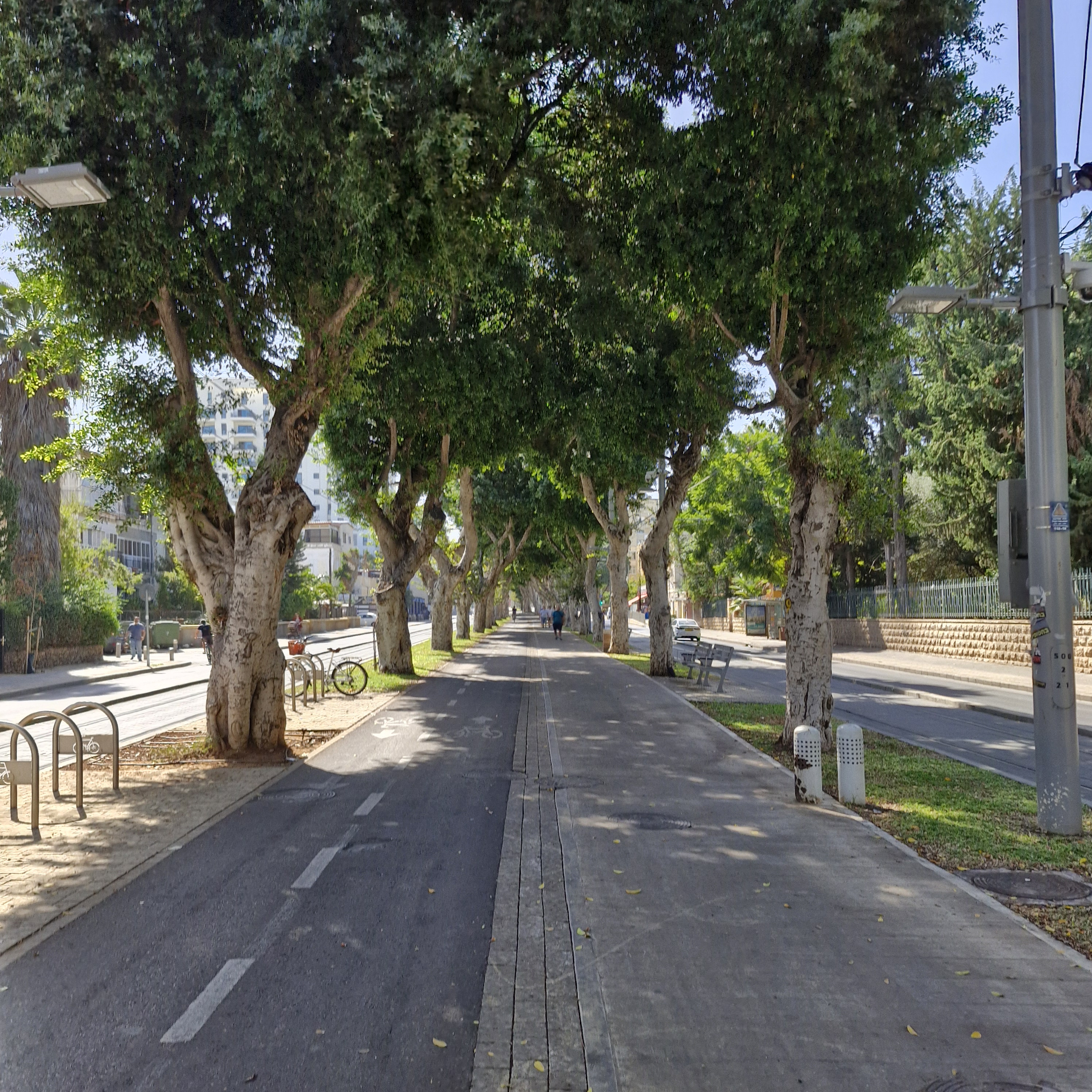
Ficus trees along the boulevard

=== State of Israel ===
In 2016, there were 860 ficus trees along the length of Sderot Yerushalayim. DUring the construction of the Tel Aviv Light Rail, some were removed or relocated.
