= Isis Lock =

Canal lock in Oxfordshire, England, UK

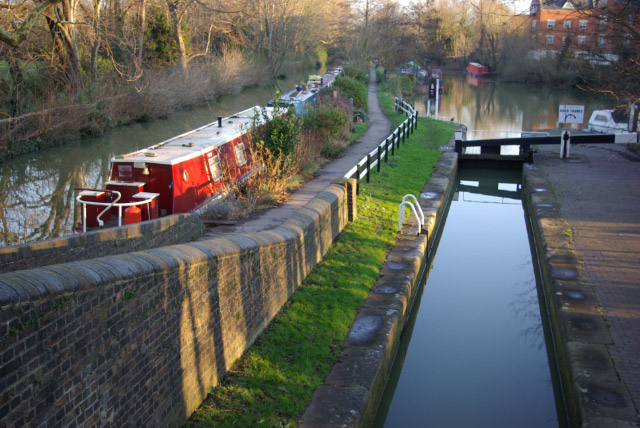
- Isis Lock with the Oxford Canal on the left and the Castle Mill Stream on the right.
- Interactive map of Isis Lock
- 51.75598°N 1.26924°W
- Waterway: Oxford Canal/Castle Mill Stream
- County: Oxfordshire
- First built: 1795–97
- Latest built: 1844
- Length: 77'

Isis Lock (known to boatmen as "Louse Lock") is a lock connecting the Oxford Canal and the Castle Mill Stream, a backwater of the River Thames in Oxford, England.

== Location ==
The Isis Lock is close to Sheepwash Channel, just to the south and linking with the River Thames to the west. To the west of the lock are Rewley Road, the Cherwell Valley Line, and the Cotswold Line, just north of Oxford railway station. To the east over the Oxford Canal are the grounds of Worcester College, one of the colleges of Oxford University.

There is a winding hole for boats to turn on the Oxford Canal just to the north of the lock.

== History ==
In central Oxford, the Oxford Canal and the River Thames were originally linked by a flash lock at Hythe Bridge. In 1795–97, David Harris replaced it with Isis Lock, a broad lock to allow Thames barges in and out of the Oxford Canal Company's Worcester Street wharves. Isis Lock was rebuilt as a narrow lock in 1844.

== Gallery ==
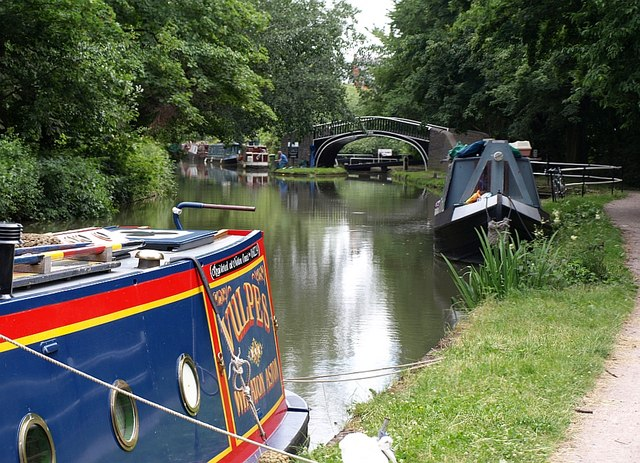
The Oxford Canal, approaching Isis Lock with narrowboats moored by the canal.

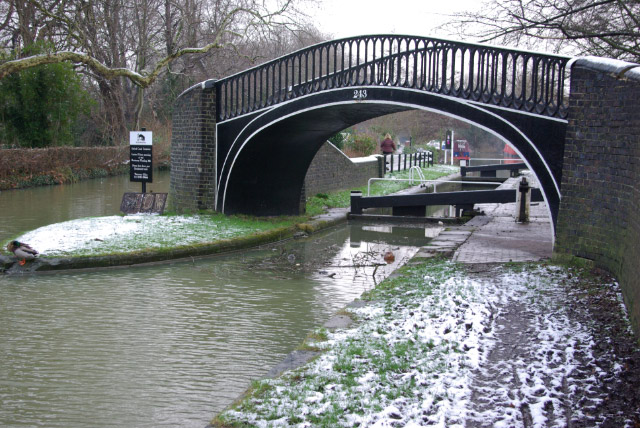
View of Isis Lock and the footbridge.

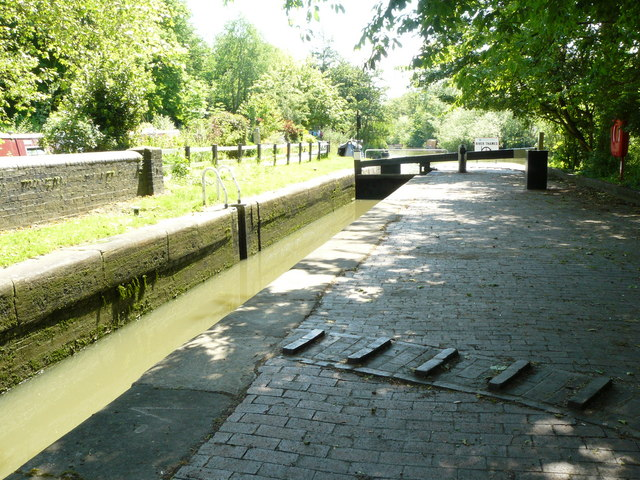
Isis Lock, looking towards the river. The raised bricks facilitate the opening of the lock gate in wet weather.

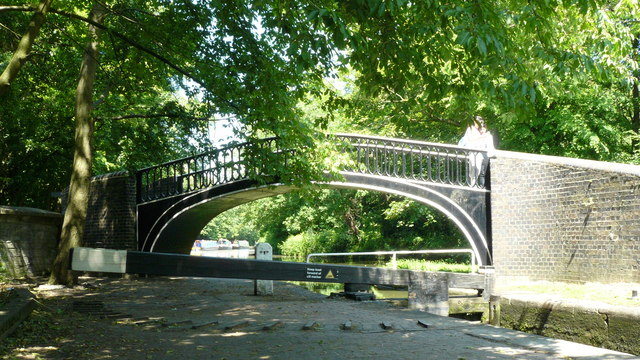
Isis Lock Looking over the lock gate and under the bridge, towards the southern part of the Oxford Canal.

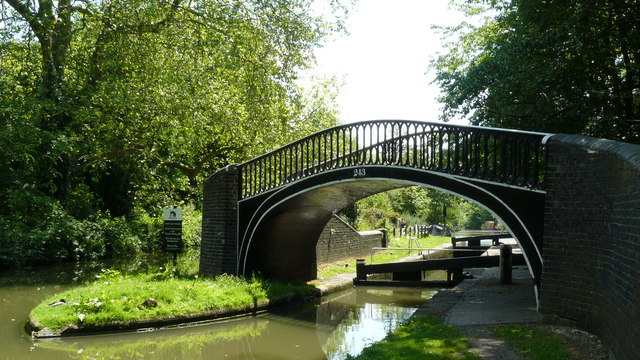
Isis Lock and the footbridge.

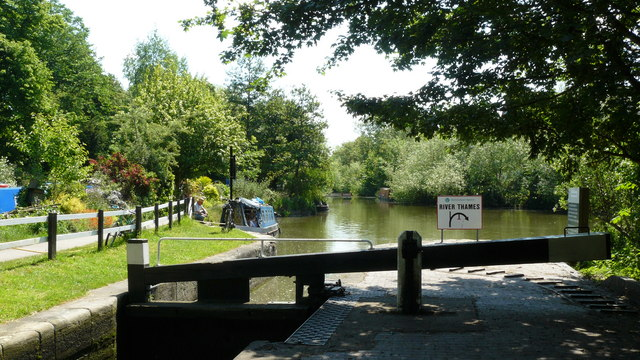
Looking over the lock gate.

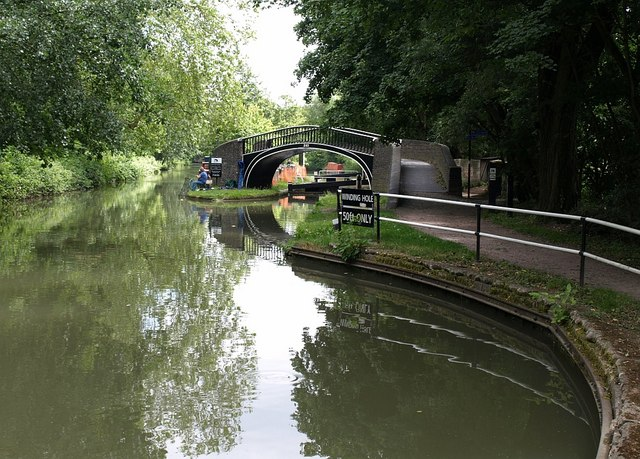
Winding hole at Isis Lock.

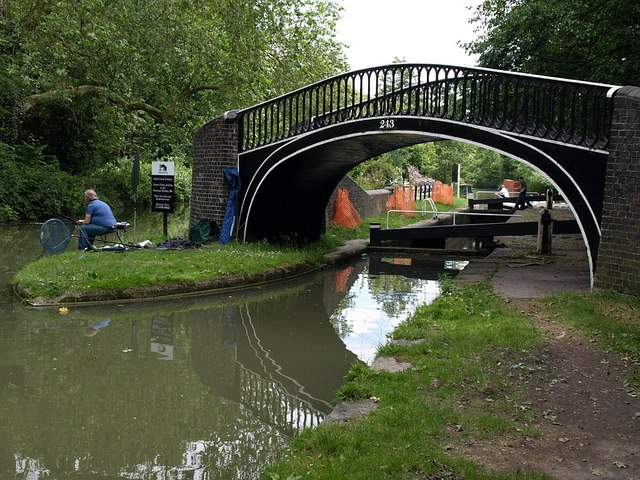
Footbridge by Isis Lock.

== Sources ==
- Davies, Mark; Robinson, Catherine (2003) [2001]. A Towpath Walk in Oxford. Oxford: Oxford Towpath Press. ISBN 0-9535593-1-9.
