= Edward Davenport =

Edward Davenport may refer to:

- Edward Davenport (fraudster) (born 1966), British convicted advance fee fraudster
- Edward Loomis Davenport (1816–1877), American actor
- Ed J. Davenport (1899–1953), Los Angeles City Council member
- Edward Davenport (Conservative politician) (1838–1874), British member of the UK Parliament for St Ives
- Edward Davies Davenport (1778–1847), British landowner and member of parliament for Shaftesbury
- Edward Davenport (MP for Coventry), member of parliament for Coventry
- Edward Davenport (cricketer), English cricketer, clergyman and educator
