= Morrell's Brewing Company =

Brewery in Oxford, England

Coordinates: 51.7515°N 1.2650°W

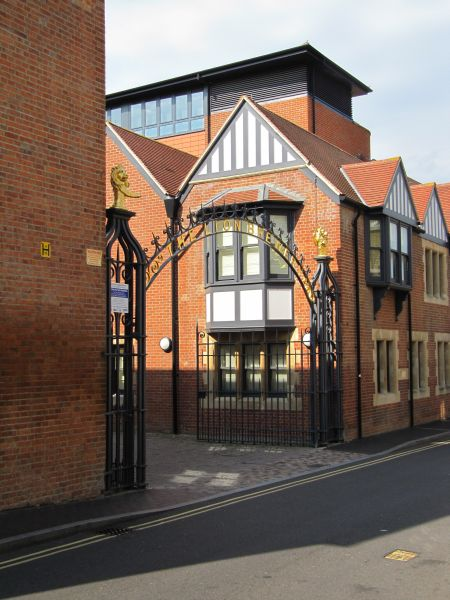
- Gates of what was the Lion Brewery
- Formerly: The Lion Brewery
- Founded: 1743
- Defunct: 1998
- Headquarters: St Thomas's Street; Oxford; England
- Owner: Morrell family

Morrell's Brewing Company, also known as the Lion Brewery after their principal brewery, was the only major brewery in Oxford, England. It operated between 1782 and 1998.

== History ==
=== Establishment ===
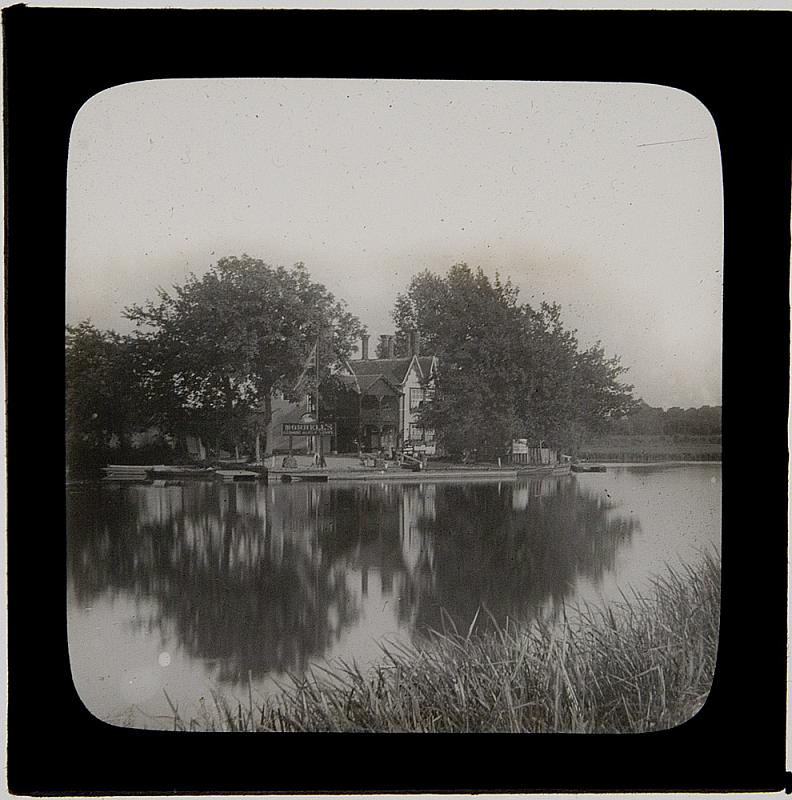
The Swan Inn, Rose Island, River Thames; the sign to the left advertises Morrell's Genuine Ales & Stout

The Lion Brewery was founded in 1743 by Richard Tawney (1684–1756), a former boat master of Upper Fisher Row, just off St Thomas' Street in Oxford. It passed to his elder son, also Richard Tawney (1721–1791), and as he left no male heir, it then passed to his younger brother Edward Tawney (1735–1800).

In 1797, Edward Tawney formed a partnership with Mark and James Morrell, whose uncle was a prominent Oxford solicitor, with a view to them buying out his interest. James Morrell (1773–1855) eventually became the sole owner of the brewery, and he was succeeded by his son, also James Morrell (1810–1863). 1863 and 1864 saw the deaths of James Morrell and his wife Alicia leaving the brewery to their ten year old daughter Emily Morrell. Her inheritance was put under the control of three trustees who tried to deal with Emily's crush on a distant cousin by sending her away to an aunt and forbidding any communication between the pair.

=== Going concern ===
Morrell's brewed its beers at the Lion Brewery in St Thomas Street. In the 19th century Morrell's redeveloped and extended the Lion Brewery a number of times. A large brewing shed was added in 1879, a blacksmith's shop and engine house in 1880, a further shed and new yard in 1882, stables in 1889, new offices in 1892, a tun room in 1895, further offices in 1897 and a tall octagonal chimney in 1901. All these developments were designed by the local architect Harry Drinkwater, who also designed a number of the company's pubs.

The Lion Brewery was powered by a waterwheel on Castle Mill Stream, a branch of the River Thames. This was supplemented by steam engines for which the engine house was built. One rotative beam engine that was built for the Lion Brewery in about 1826 remained in service until 1964 and is now preserved at the Abbey Pumping Station, Leicester.

The Morrell family lived at Headington Hill Hall and their estate included South Park. The family included Philip Morrell (1870–1943), who was a Liberal MP 1906–18 and was married to Lady Ottoline Morrell. In 1929–31 Morrell Avenue was built along the south side of South Park. The family also owned the village of Streatley and one side of the family lived there, until Emily Morrell died in 1938, when the estate was sold.

=== Closure ===
After an acrimonious family dispute the brewery was closed in 1998.

Refresh UK bought the beer brands and for a time Thomas Hardy Burtonwood was contracted to brew them. Marston's acquired Refresh UK in 2008 and now brews Morrells beers.

Michael Cannon, owner of the US hamburger chain Fuddruckers, bought Morrell's estate of 132 tied pubs for £48 million through a new company, Morrells of Oxford. In 2002 Cannon sold 107 of the pubs to Greene King for £67 million.

The Lion Brewery site was redeveloped for luxury apartments in 2002. The waterwheel and yellow brick chimney were retained but only the façades were retained of the other buildings.

== Sources and further reading ==
- Allen, Brigid (1994). Morrells of Oxford: The Family and Their Brewery 1743–1993. Stroud: Alan Sutton Publishing. ISBN 978-0-7509-0634-0.
- Hibbert, Christopher, ed. (1988). "Morrell Avenue / Morrell's Brewery". The Encyclopaedia of Oxford. Macmillan. p. 261. ISBN 0-333-39917-X.
- Tyack, Geoffrey (1998). Oxford An Architectural Guide. Oxford & New York: Oxford University Press. p. 269. ISBN 0-19-817423-3.
- Woolley, Liz (2010). "Industrial Architecture in Oxford, 1870 to 1914". Oxoniensia. LXXV. Oxfordshire Architectural and Historical Society: 79. ISSN 0308-5562.
