= St Thomas the Martyr's Church, Oxford =

Coordinates: 51.751662°N 1.268504°W

St Thomas the Martyr Church, Oxford
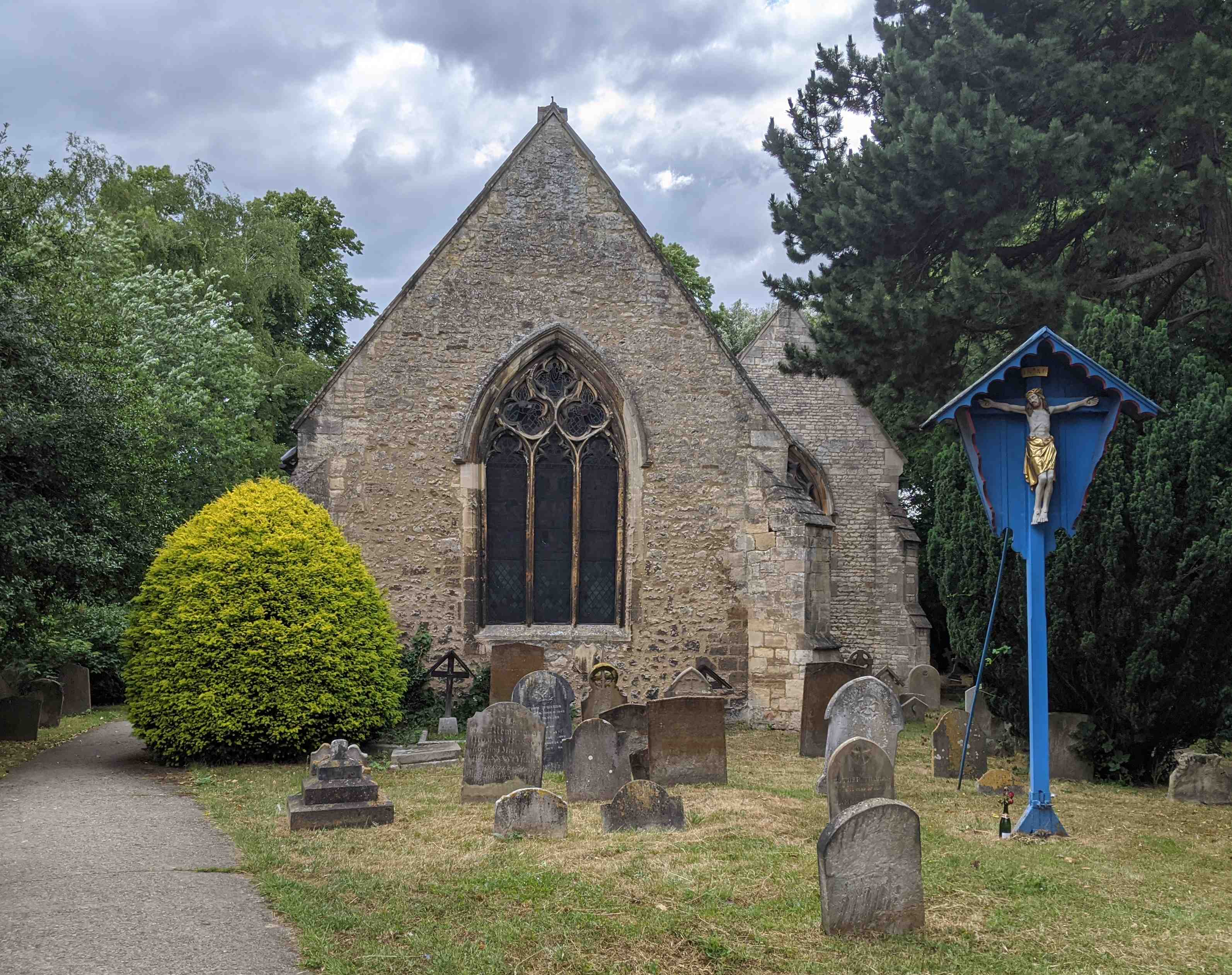
- The east end of the church
- St Thomas the Martyr Church, Oxford
- OS grid reference: SP 50599 06155
- Country: England
- Denomination: Church of England
- Churchmanship: Anglo-Catholic

History
- Founded: 12th century
- Dedication: Thomas Becket

Administration
- Province: Canterbury
- Diocese: Oxford

St Thomas the Martyr Church is a Church of England parish church of the Anglo-Catholic tradition, in Oxford, England, near Oxford railway station in Osney. It is located between Becket Street to the west and Hollybush Row to the east, with St Thomas' Street opposite.

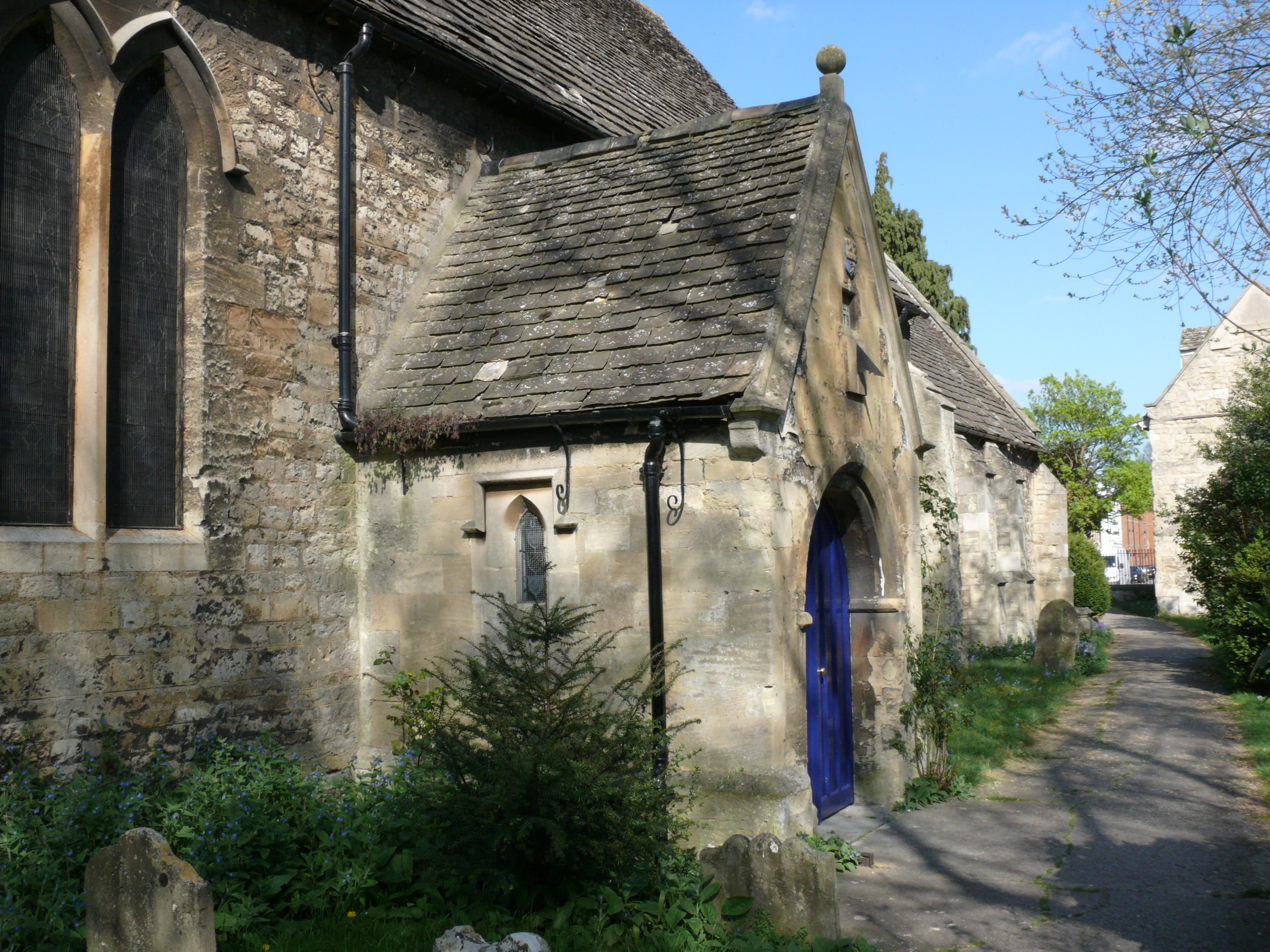
The south wall of the church

The church was founded in the 12th century, dedicated to St Thomas Becket. The building still retains some of its original architecture, although substantial expansions and repairs have been made, particularly in the 17th century (under the curacy of Robert Burton) and in the 19th century.

The church played a significant role in the early stages of the Oxford Movement, being the site of daily services as well as such ritualist practices as altar candles and the wearing of Eucharistic vestments. The leaders of the Movement preached at the church, and the early Tractarians were closely associated with St Thomas's.

== History ==
=== To the Restoration ===
It has traditionally been held in Osney that the church was founded in the reign of Stephen, but this is unlikely to be true, as Thomas Becket was not martyred until some fifteen years after Stephen's death. It is known that in the 1180s, the site was granted to the canons of the nearby Osney Abbey, and a chapel was erected on the site around 1190. From the mid-13th century the Osney area was referred to as the parish of St Thomas', but it remained nominally a chapel of the abbey until the dissolution of the Monasteries under Henry VIII, when it was placed under Christ Church, Oxford. Christ Church treated it as a conventional parish church with a curate, and from the mid-19th century the incumbent was styled a vicar.

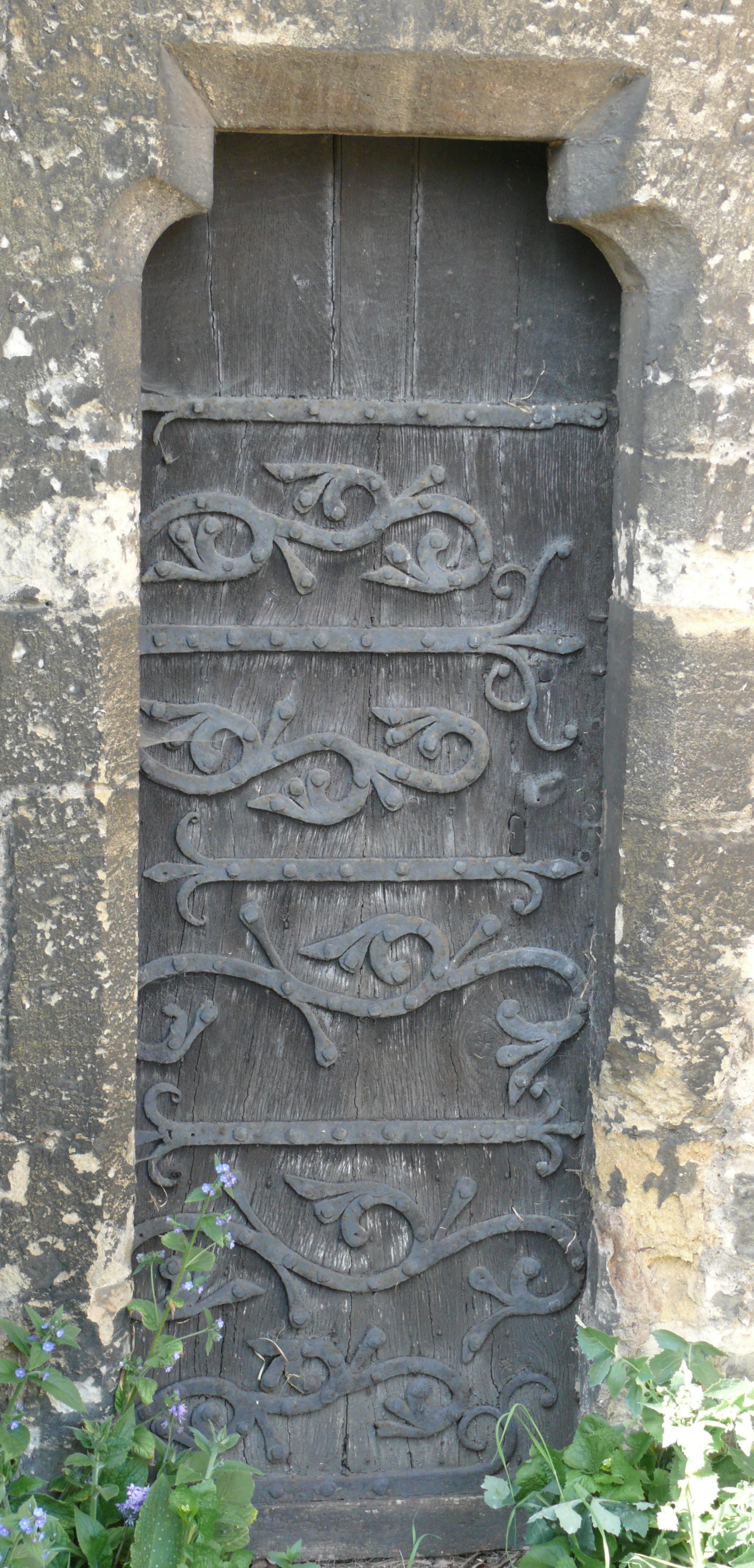
The 13th-century priest's door in the south wall.

After the curacy was placed under the patronage of Christ Church, the incumbents were mostly scholars or members of the college; from 1616 to 1640 the curacy was held by Robert Burton, author of The Anatomy of Melancholy, who enlarged the church. In the English Civil War the medieval stained glass in the church was destroyed, partly due to the vandalism of Parliamentarian troops captured at Cirencester in 1642 and imprisoned in the church. Following the Restoration the holders of the curacy changed rapidly, often remaining in the position for only a few years at a time. From at least 1713 Christ Church leased a house in High Street to parish trustees and the profits were used for repairing the church. This continued until 1923, when the house was sold.

=== 19th and 20th centuries ===
By the early 19th century, the church and its parish were showing signs of neglect. In 1802 only ten communicants are recorded, and in 1814 some 90% of the parish was thought to be non-churchgoing. The parish was further reduced by the creation of the parishes of St Paul's in 1837, St Barnabas' in 1869, and St Frideswide's in 1873.

The curate from 1823 to 1842, one John Jones, brought a significant turnaround in attendance; perhaps the most unusual innovation was a houseboat – the "Boatmans' Floating Chapel" – acquired in 1839, for use as a chapel serving the families working on the river and the Oxford Canal. This boat was St Thomas' first chapel of ease; it was donated by H. Ward, a local coal merchant, and used until it sank in 1868. It was replaced by a chapel dedicated to St Nicholas that remained in use until 1892. A second chapel was built in 1860, dedicated to St Frideswide, later replaced by the new parish church of St Frideswide's, which took on the parish of New Osney in 1873.

Major repairs were carried out beginning in 1825. The floor-level was raised above flood-level, a full three feet. The roof was rebuilt, the south wall was rebuilt using the original materials, and the main features of the 12th-century chancel arch were discarded.

The vicar from 1842 to 1892 was Thomas Chamberlain (later founder of St Edward's School), a firm believer in the Tractarian movement, who introduced daily services as well as such ritualist practices as altar candles and the wearing of Eucharistic vestments – the latter causing him to be rebuked by Bishop Wilberforce in 1855. Many of the leaders of the Oxford Movement, including Edward Bouverie Pusey, Henry Parry Liddon, John Mason Neale, Charles Fuge Lowder and Edward King preached at the church. In the early days of the movement, Anglo-Catholicism was closely associated with St Thomas'. In 1847 Chamberlain founded the Community of St Thomas Martyr, which was devoted to the assistance of the poor of the parish, by now heavily slumland; this sisterhood remained active until 1958. The convent buildings for it were built in 1886, but have since been demolished. In 1846 the north aisle and vestry were demolished and a new aisle of five bays with a vestry at its west end was built in its place. The blocked tower arch and two blocked windows in the chancel were opened and a new chancel arch was built.

The vicar from 1896 to 1908 was T.H. Birley, later Bishop of Zanzibar. In 1897 the building was again re-roofed and a vestry built against the north wall of the tower. St Thomas' was declared an ancient parish in 1948.

=== Present day ===
The parish of St Thomas the Martyr had passed Resolutions A and B under the Priests (Ordination of Women) Measure 1993, to reject the ordination of women as priests. It also petitioned for and received alternative episcopal oversight from the Bishop of Ebbsfleet, then the provincial episcopal visitor for traditionalist Anglo-Catholics.

In September 2015 the parish was united with the neighbouring parish of St Barnabas, Oxford, to form the new parish of St Barnabas and St Paul, with St Thomas the Martyr, Oxford. St Barnabas is the parish church and St Thomas is the chapel of ease. The first vicar of the new parish was Fr Jonathan Beswick. In 2019, he was succeeded by Fr Christopher Woods.

In November 2022, the parish began a consultation as to whether or not to rescind this arrangement, and in January 2023 the PCC voted by a majority to welcome the ministry of women priests and bishops.

== Architecture ==
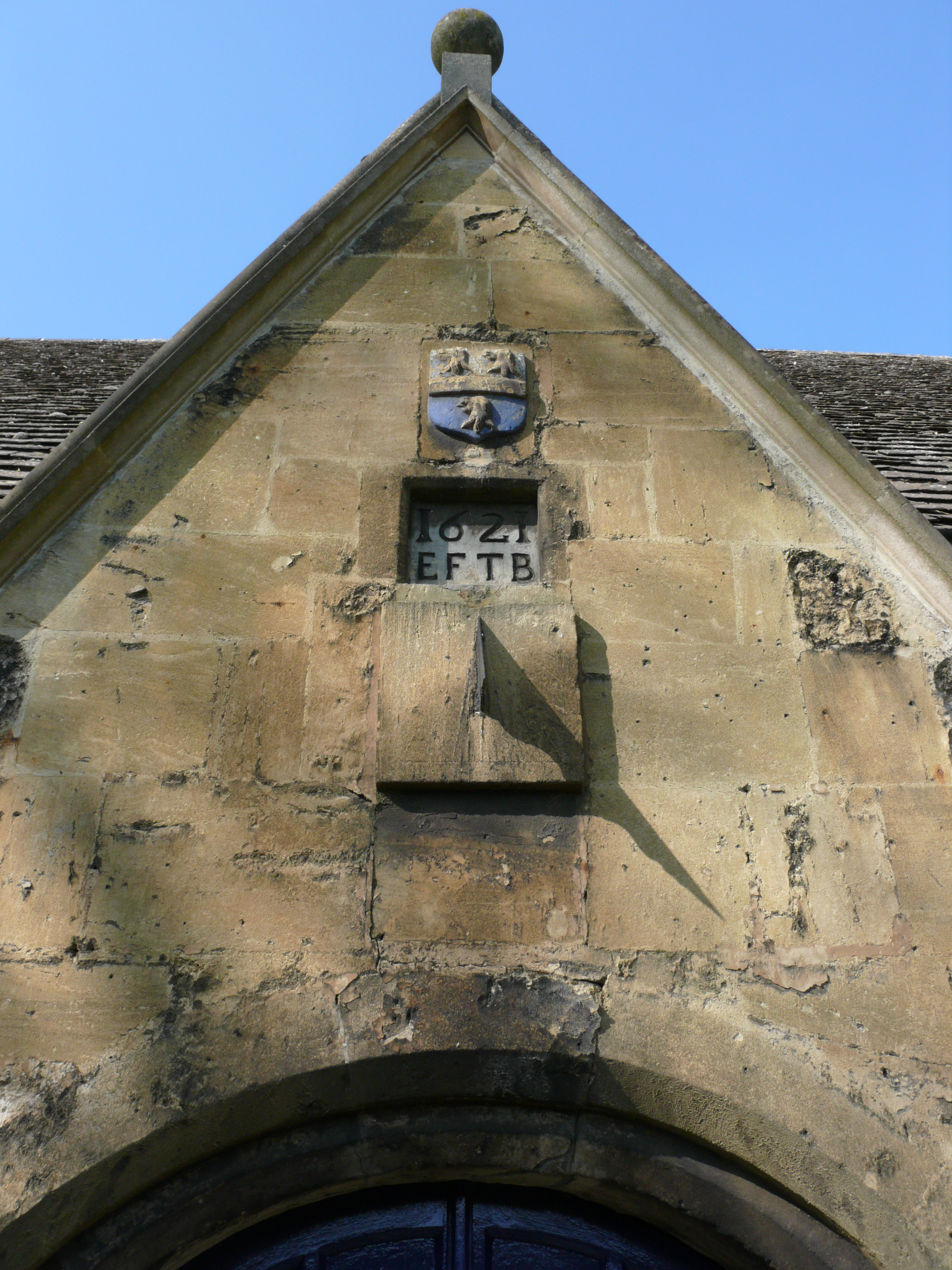
The gable of the south porch. Note date of 1621, and the arms of Dr Burton.

The church has a nave with a north aisle and vestry, a Perpendicular Gothic west tower, a chancel and a south porch. The nave was rebuilt in the late 15th or early 16th century to meet a tower of approximately the same age; it is often dated to 1521, but appears to be built on older foundations. The southern side of the nave contains what are probably thirteenth-century buttresses and a pair of Perpendicular Gothic windows. The north aisle was originally built in the 13th century, and rebuilt by H.J. Underwood in 1890; the vestry was built in the 17th century and rebuilt in 1846 to designs by Chamberlain, through the generosity of the curate, Alexander Penrose Forbes. The church has been reroofed at least twice, in 1825 and 1897.

The chancel, which has a ceiling decorated by C. E. Kempe, has three windows in the style of the late 12th century, and a priest's door built into the south side circa 1250. A south porch was built in 1621 at the behest of Dr Robert Burton, whose arms are carved in the gable above the date. A candelabrum given by Ann Kendall in 1705 hangs in the chancel. The chancel ceiling was decorated with a pattern of gold stars on a blue background in 1914. Two years later, an altar was erected at the east end of the north aisle, and an aumbry placed in the north wall of the chancel. The royal arms of William IV are displayed in the tower.

St Thomas' church has been a Grade II listed building since 1954.

The churchyard contains Combe House, a 1702 building originally built as a school, as well as a vicarage designed in 1893 by C. C. Rolfe. The remains of an earlier Rolfe building, the 1886 Sisterhood of St Thomas, are also present; in 1974, these amounted to a single cottage and a sculptured brick gateway.

The pulpit was carved by James Rogers (1849–1931) in memory of his father, Thomas Rogers (1804–55), one-time Keeper of the Oxford County Hall. James Rogers also carved many of the pew ends and, possibly, the misericords in the choir stalls.
