= Quaking Bridge =

Bridge in Oxford, England

Coordinates: 51.7518°N 1.2640°W

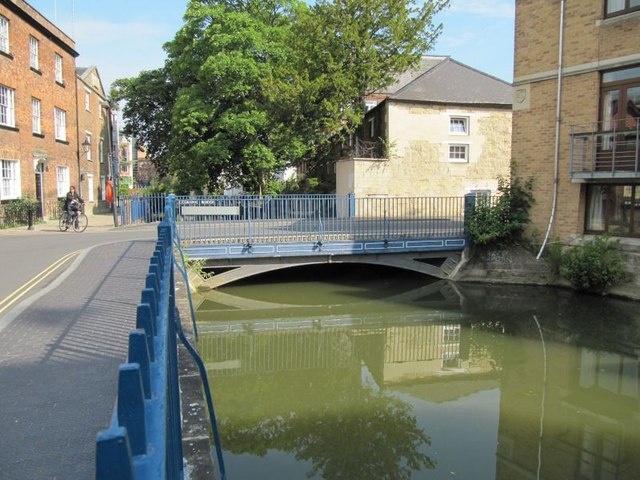
View of the Quaking Bridge and Castle Mill Stream seen from Paradise Street.

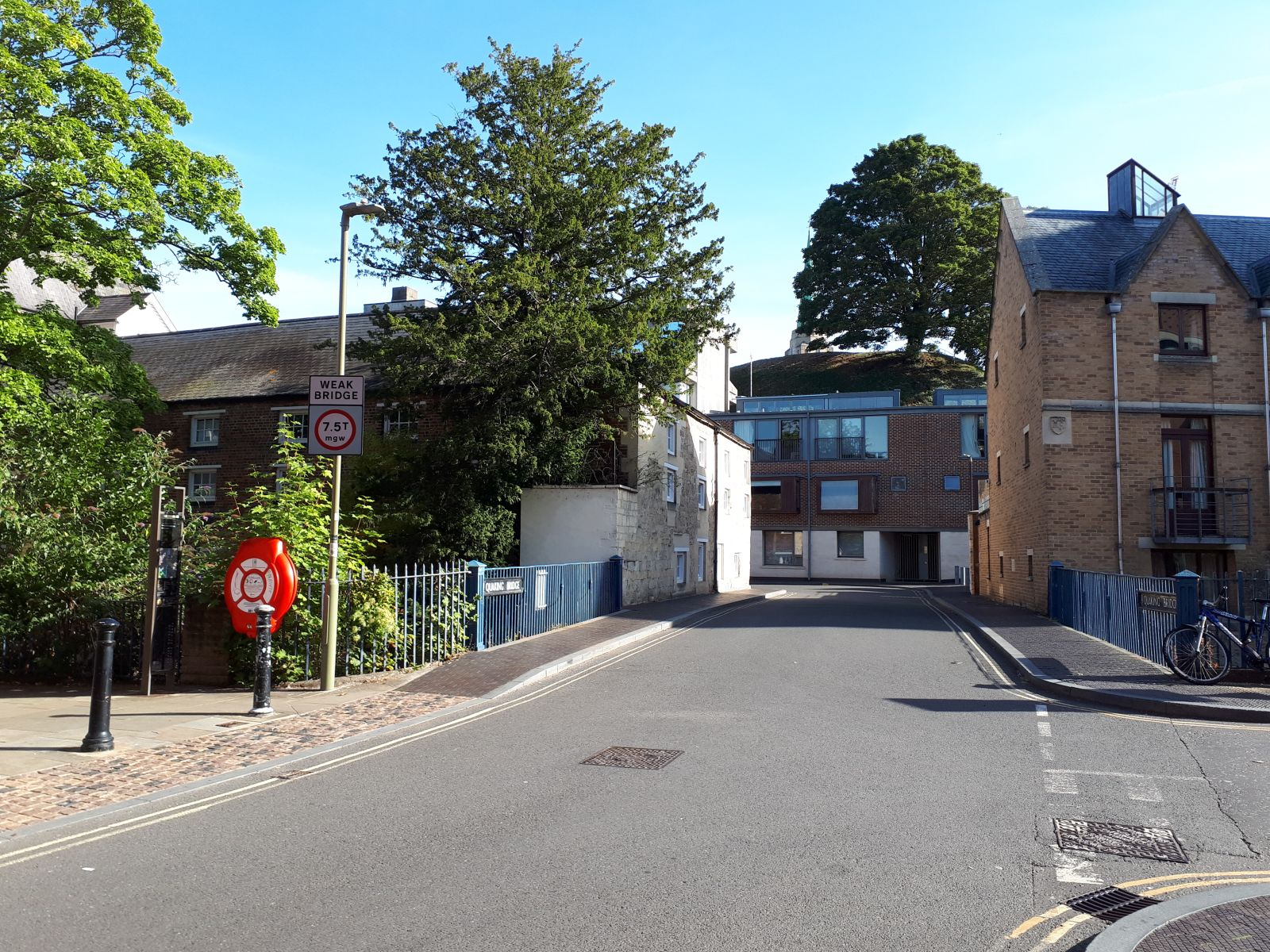
Quaking Bridge seen from St Thomas' Street looking into Tidmarsh Lane. Note the motte (mound) of Oxford Castle in the background.

Quaking Bridge is a bridge over the Castle Mill Stream in the English city of Oxford. It connects St Thomas' Street and Paradise Street, to the west of the stream, with Tidmarsh Lane, to the east. Oxford Castle lies to the east, and has a pedestrian entrance from Tidmarsh Lane adjacent to the bridge. To the north, the Castle Mill Stream is crossed by Pacey's Bridge and Hythe Bridge, whilst to the south it is crossed by Swan Bridge.

There has been a bridge at this location from at least the late 13th century. Quaking Bridge was first mentioned in 1297, but is probably much older. The origin of the bridge name is uncertain, but it may derive the unsafe condition of an early bridge. In the Close Rolls of May 1324 it is described as "a bridge anciently constructed" and it is stated that the canons of Oseney Abbey "were wont to pass" for services in St George's Chapel at the castle.

The bridge was originally wooden, and the responsibility for the bridge's upkeep was meant to be that of the King. In 1821, it had three arches and open timberwork acting as railings. The bridge was replaced with an iron one in 1835. A plaque on the bridge records that the iron work was by Cort & Co of Leicester.

Next bridge upstream	Castle Mill Stream	Next bridge downstream
Pacey's Bridge	Quaking Bridge; Grid reference SP508062	Swan Bridge
