= St Thomas' Street, Oxford =

Street in central Oxford, England

Coordinates: 51.751746°N 1.265757°W

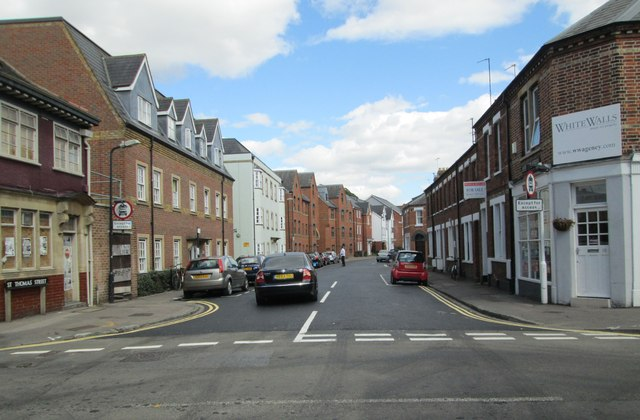
St Thomas' Street looking east from the crossing with Hollybush Row

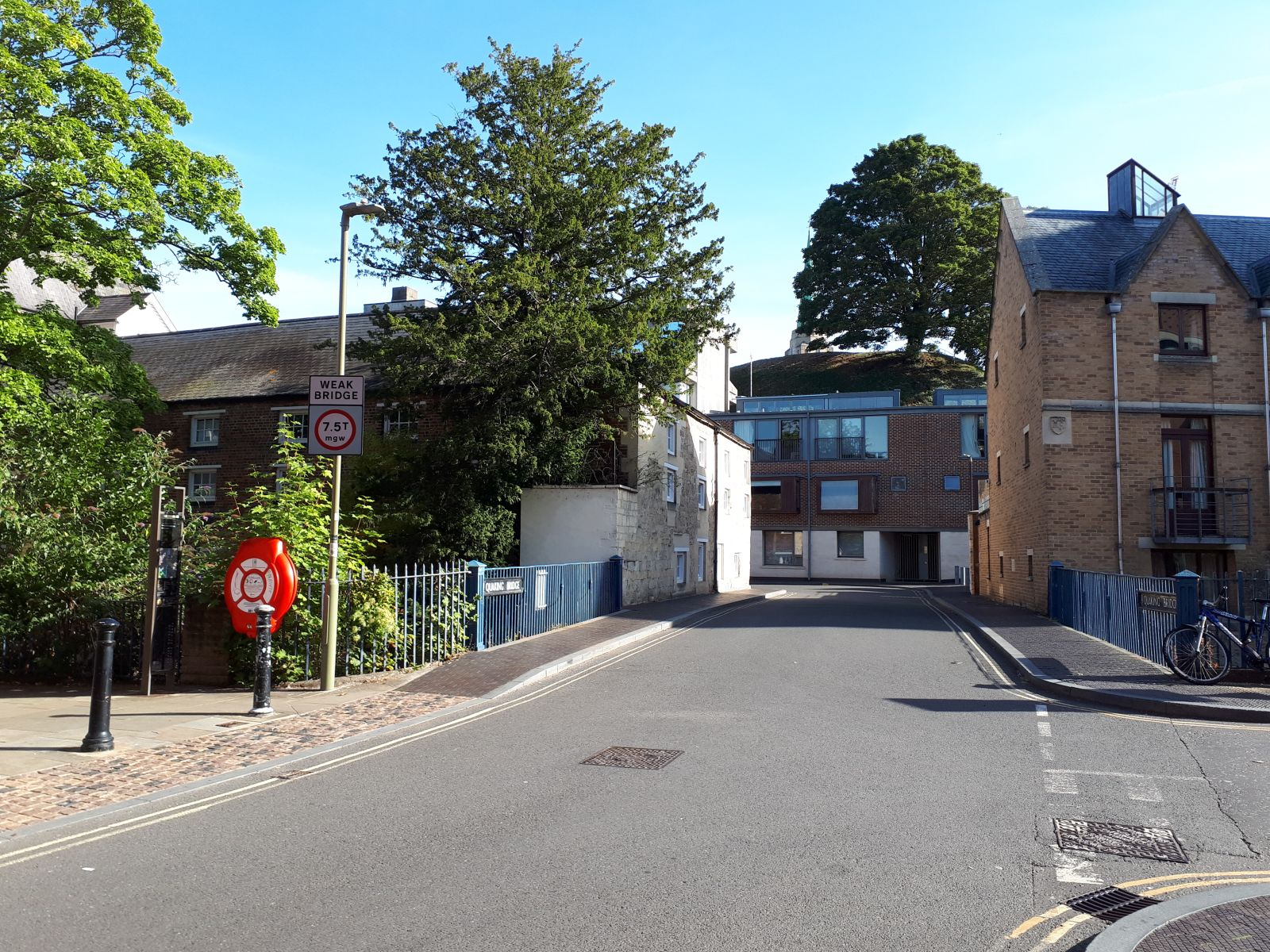
The east end of the street, with Quaking Bridge and the Castle Motte

St Thomas' Street is a historical street in central Oxford, England. It lies to the west of Oxford Castle, linking the Quaking Bridge, across Castle Mill Stream, to St Thomas' Church. The street connects to Tidmarsh Lane and Paradise Street, near the Quaking Bridge, and crosses Hollybush Row, near the St Thomas' Church.

The brewery and headquarters complex of Oxford brewers Morrells, known as the Lion Brewery, was located on St Thomas' Street from 1743 until it was closed in 1998 and the site redeveloped into an apartment complex in 2002. Although some of the buildings were demolished during this redevelopment, the entrance, offices, engine house, chimney and waterwheel have been retained.

The waterwheel at Lion Brewery was driven by the Wareham Stream, a side-stream of the Castle Mill Stream. St Thomas' Street passes over this stream on Bookbinders' Bridge.
