= Paradise Square (disambiguation) =

Paradise Square is a Georgian square in the City of Sheffield. It may also refer to:

- Firdos Square in Baghdad, Iraq
- Paradise Square in Five Points, Manhattan, United States of America
- Paradise Square adjoining Paradise Street, Oxford, United Kingdom
- Paradise Square (musical), a stage musical
