= Emily Morrell =

British land and brewery owner (1854–1938)

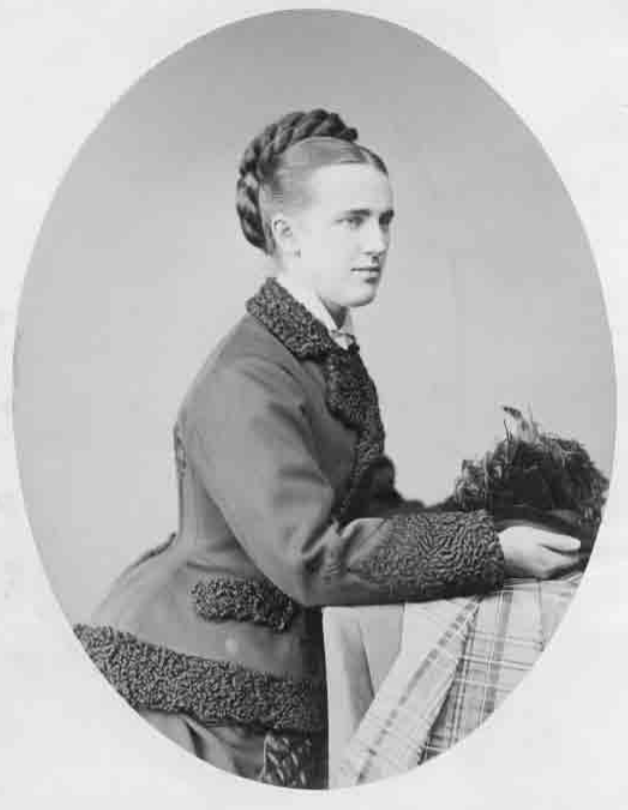
- Born: Emily Alicia Morrell; 1854
- Died: 1938 (aged 83–84)
- Known for: Morrell's Brewing Company, wealthy landowner
- Spouse: Herbert Morrell

Emily Morrell (1854 – 1938) was a British land and brewery owner of the Oxford-based Morrell family.

== Life ==
Morrell was born in 1854. Her grandfather was James Morrell, her father was James Morrell, and her mother was Alicia. Her parents owned the Morrells Brewing Company. Her father had inherited Headington Hill Hall which he significantly extended in 1856 and 1858 resulting in an Italianate mansion designed by architect John Thomas.

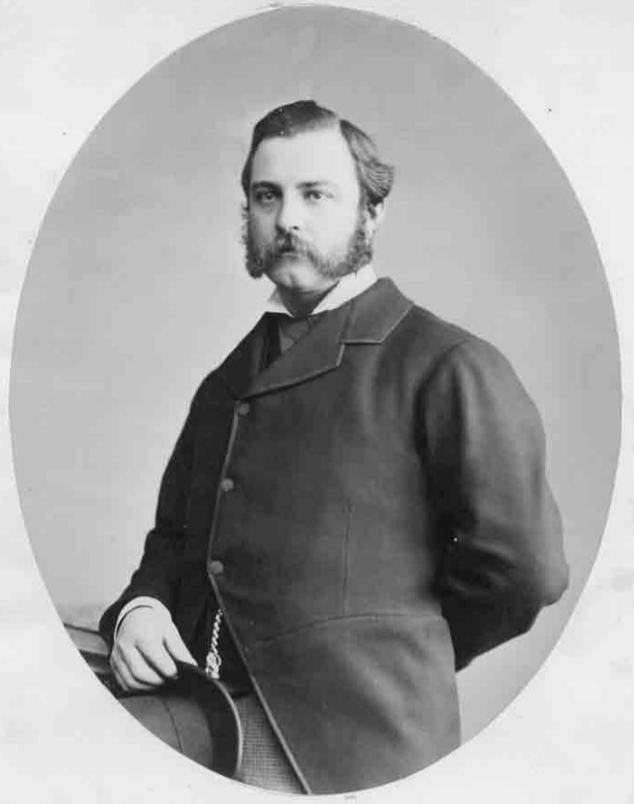
George Herbert Morrell, her husband

1863 saw the death of her father, and her mother Alicia died the following year, leaving the brewery and the family's estates, including the hall, to their then ten-year-old daughter, Emily. Her inheritance was put under the control of three trustees who managed the lands and businesses on her behalf. The trustees tried to deal with Emily's crush on a distant cousin by sending her away to an aunt and forbidding any communication between the pair.

She and her third cousin George Herbert Morrell were eventually married when she was 20. They lived at Headington Hill Hall. The pair threw lavish parties, one of which included 300 guests—Oscar Wilde among them. Wilde turned up dressed as the Prince Regent in 1878. Wilde was said to be so thrilled by the hired outfit that he bought it outright.

In 1891, the aunt who had taken her in as a child, Emily Stone, died and she added to Morrell's fortune by leaving her nearly £90,000. She also instructed that a £1000 should be invested and the interest each year was to be used to buy coal for the poor. George Herbert Morrell administered the charity until he died in 1906, at which time Emily took over. The charity would outlive her, lasting for 114 years.

She and George Herbert Morrell had two sons. James Morrell III took over the brewery in 1926 after he convinced the trustees that he would be more successful than their default decision, which was to sell.

Morrell died in 1938.
