= Castle Mill Stream =

Stream in Oxfordshire, England

Coordinates: 51.7464°N 1.2637°W

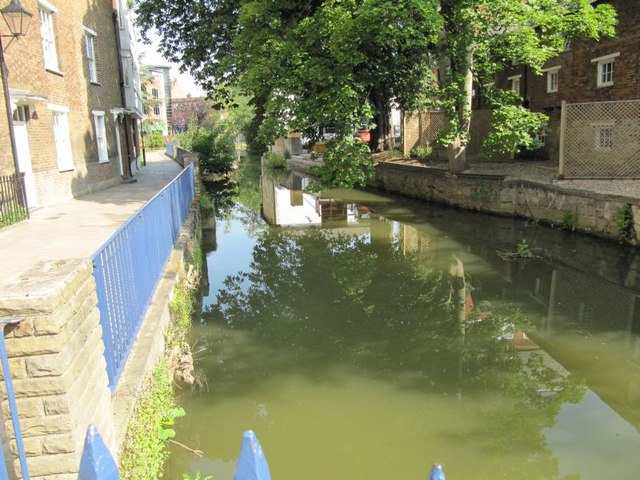
The Castle Mill Stream.

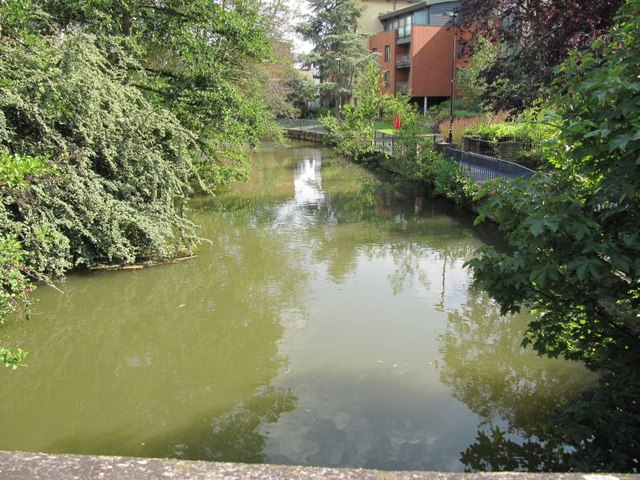
Another view of the mill stream.

Castle Mill Stream is a 5.5-kilometre (3.4 mi) long backwater of the River Thames in the west of Oxford, England. It has its own secondary backwater, known as the Wareham Stream, that is 0.5 kilometres (0.31 mi) long.

== Course ==
=== Castle Mill Stream ===
The Castle Mill Stream leaves the main course of the River Thames at the south end of Port Meadow, immediately upstream of Medley Footbridge, split by the northern part of Fiddler's Island to the west. It flows between Port Meadow to the north and Cripley Meadow (largely allotments) to the south. It then passes under the Cherwell Valley railway line and turns south, alongside the southern end of the Oxford Canal and the railway tracks, across which is the Castle Mill graduate housing development of the University of Oxford.

Further south, the Isis Lock gives access to the Oxford Canal, and the short Sheepwash Channel leads west under the railway tracks to the main stream of the Thames. The stream then flows past the vestigial remains of Rewley Abbey before reaching Upper Fisher Row, where the Wareham Stream leaves the main channel.

The stream then flows under a series of bridges: Hythe Bridge (on Hythe Bridge Street), Pacey's Bridge (on Park End Street}, Quaking Bridge (between St Thomas' Street and Tidmarsh Lane), and Swan Bridge (on Paradise Street and once known as Castle Bridge), outside the original medieval city walls of Oxford, near Oxford Castle. It is then re-joined by the Wareham Stream and continues under Oxpens Road and rejoins the Thames immediately upstream of the Gasworks Bridge.

=== Wareham Stream ===
The Wareham Stream leaves the Castle Mill Stream at the upper end of Upper Fisher Row. It then flows under Little Hythe Bridge (on Hythe Bridge Street), Pacey's Bridge (on Park End Street} and Bookbinders' Bridge (on St Thomas' Street) before re-entering the Castle Mill Stream near to the city centre campus of the City of Oxford College.

== History ==
The stream was altered greatly in Saxon and early Norman times. There was a mill here even before the castle existed. In the winter of 1142, there was a siege at the castle. Empress Matilda (aka Queen Maud, 1102–1167), the daughter and dispossessed heir of Henry I, was there during her power struggle with King Stephen (1096–1154). The queen escaped from the castle after her guards lowered her over the walls. She was clothed in a white dress that camouflaged her against the snow. Matilda crept through the enemy lines and across the Castle Mill Stream to escape to freedom.

In the Middle Ages, the stream was used for navigation, at least above Hythe Bridge. During the 16th century, hay, wood, stone, and slate were unloaded at a wharf at Hythe Bridge. When the Oxford Canal was built, it provided an easier route into the centre of Oxford, and in 1795-96 Daniel Harris built Isis Lock to allow Thames river traffic to access the canal wharves. The stream then fell out of use for navigation.

== Gallery ==
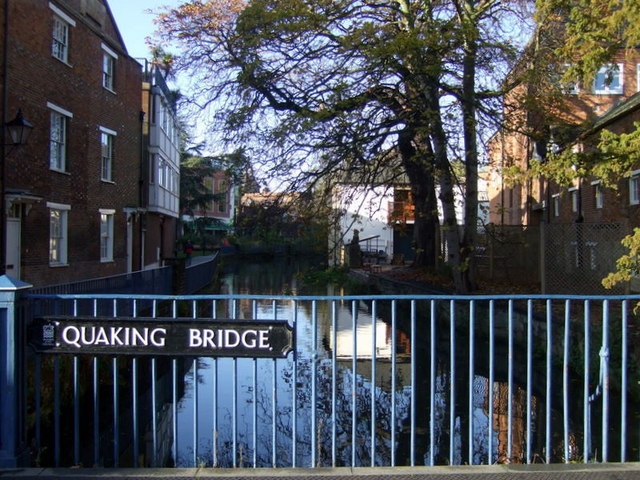
The Castle Mill Stream at Quaking Bridge.

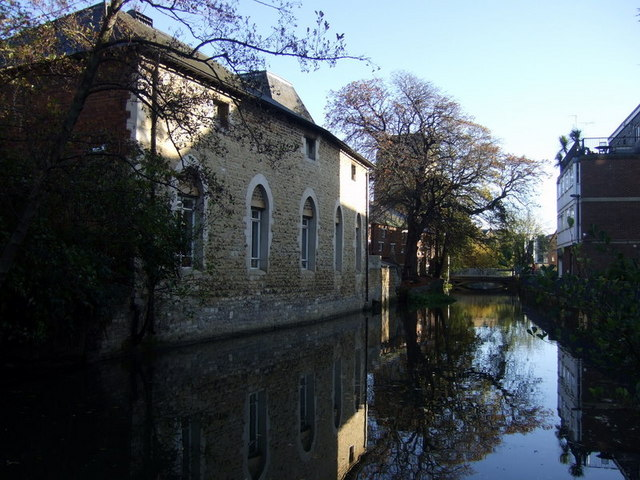
The restored Old Malthouse on the Castle Mill Stream and Tidmarsh Lane, dating from the early 19th century.

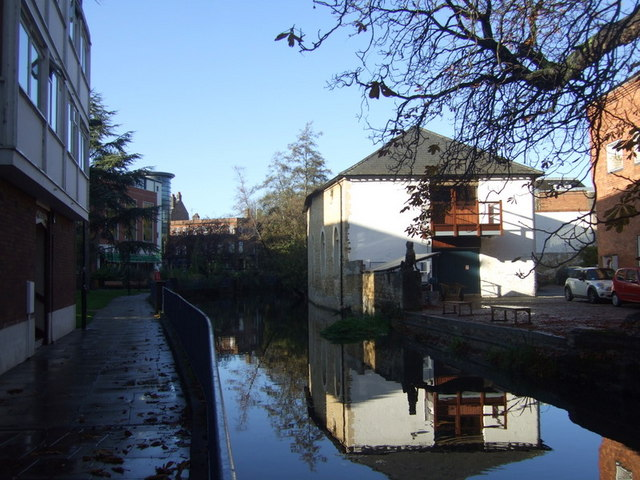
On the left is the walkway along the Castle Mill Stream, leading from St Thomas' Street to Park End Street.

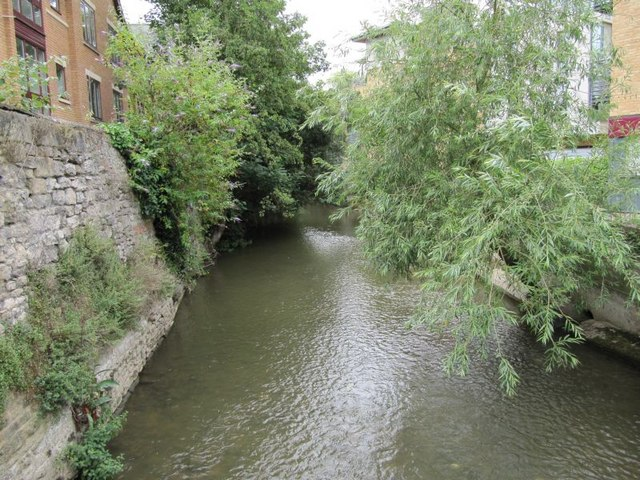
The Castle Mill Stream, near Oxpens Road.

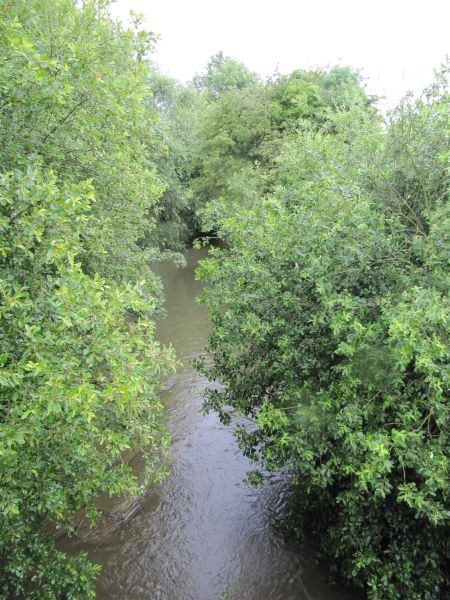
Looking the mill stream towards Oxford Castle.

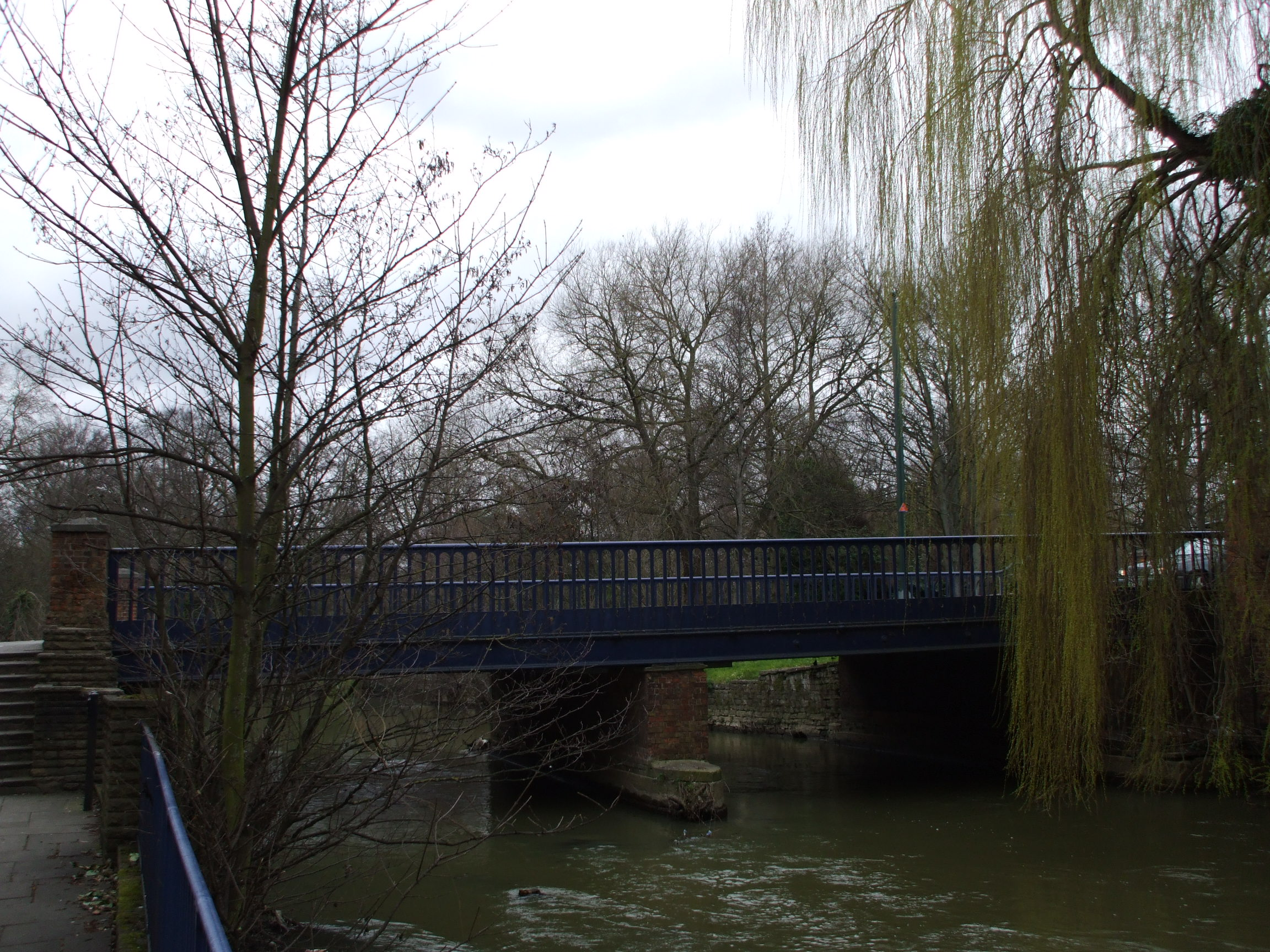
The Castle Mill Stream flowing under Hythe Bridge.

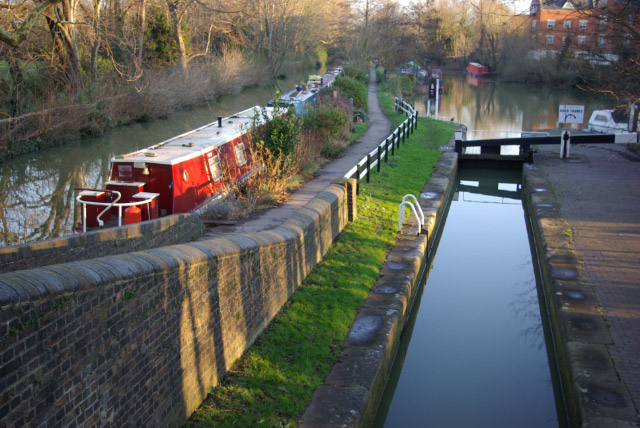
Isis Lock, linking the mill stream (right) and the Oxford Canal (left).

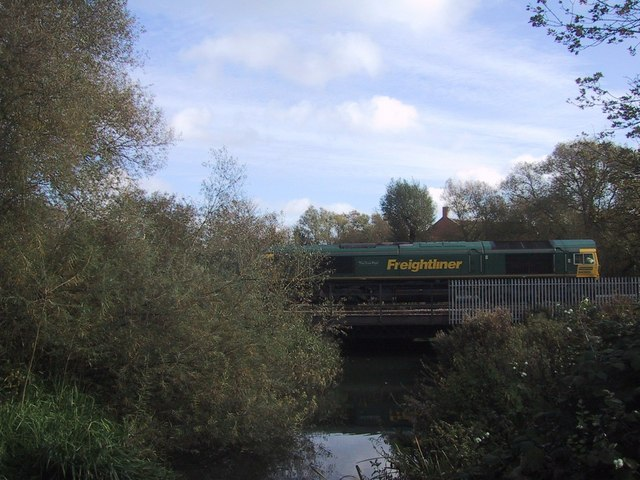
The railway bridge over the mill stream near Port Meadow, north of Oxford railway station and just south of Walton Well Road.

== See also ==
- Castle Mill, an Oxford University graduate housing complex

| Next confluence upstream | River Thames | Next confluence downstream |
| Bulstake Stream (south) | Castle Mill Stream | River Cherwell (north) |
