= Edward Davenport (cricketer) =

English cricketer (1844–1915)

Personal information
- Full name: Edward Davenport
- Born: 26 March 1844; Oxford, Oxfordshire, England
- Died: 5 March 1915 (aged 70); Stoke Talmage, Oxfordshire, England
- Batting: Right-handed
- Role: Wicket-keeper

Domestic team information
- Years: Team
- 1864–1866: Oxford University

Career statistics
Competition	First-class
Matches	7
Runs scored	318
Batting average	31.80
100s/50s	1/2
Top score	107
Catches/stumpings	2/1
- Source: Cricinfo, 24 February 2020

Edward Davenport (26 March 1844 – 5 March 1915) was an English first-class cricketer, clergyman and educator.

The son of John Marriott Davenport, he was born at Oxford in March 1844. He was educated at Rugby School, before going up to New College, Oxford. While studying at Oxford, he played first-class cricket for Oxford University on six occasions between 1864–66. In six matches for Oxford, Davenport scored 315 runs at an average of 39.37. His highest score of 107 came opening the batting against the Marylebone Cricket Club in 1866. He also made a single first-class appearance while at Oxford for Southgate Cricket Club in 1864. After graduating from Oxford, Davenport took holy orders in the Church of England and became a master at Wellington College from 1868. After retiring from his position at the college in 1904, he became the rector of Stoke Talmage, Oxfordshire. Davenport died at Stoke Talmage in March 1915.
