= Swan Bridge =

Grade II listed bridge in Oxford, English

Coordinates: 51.7512°N 1.2636°W

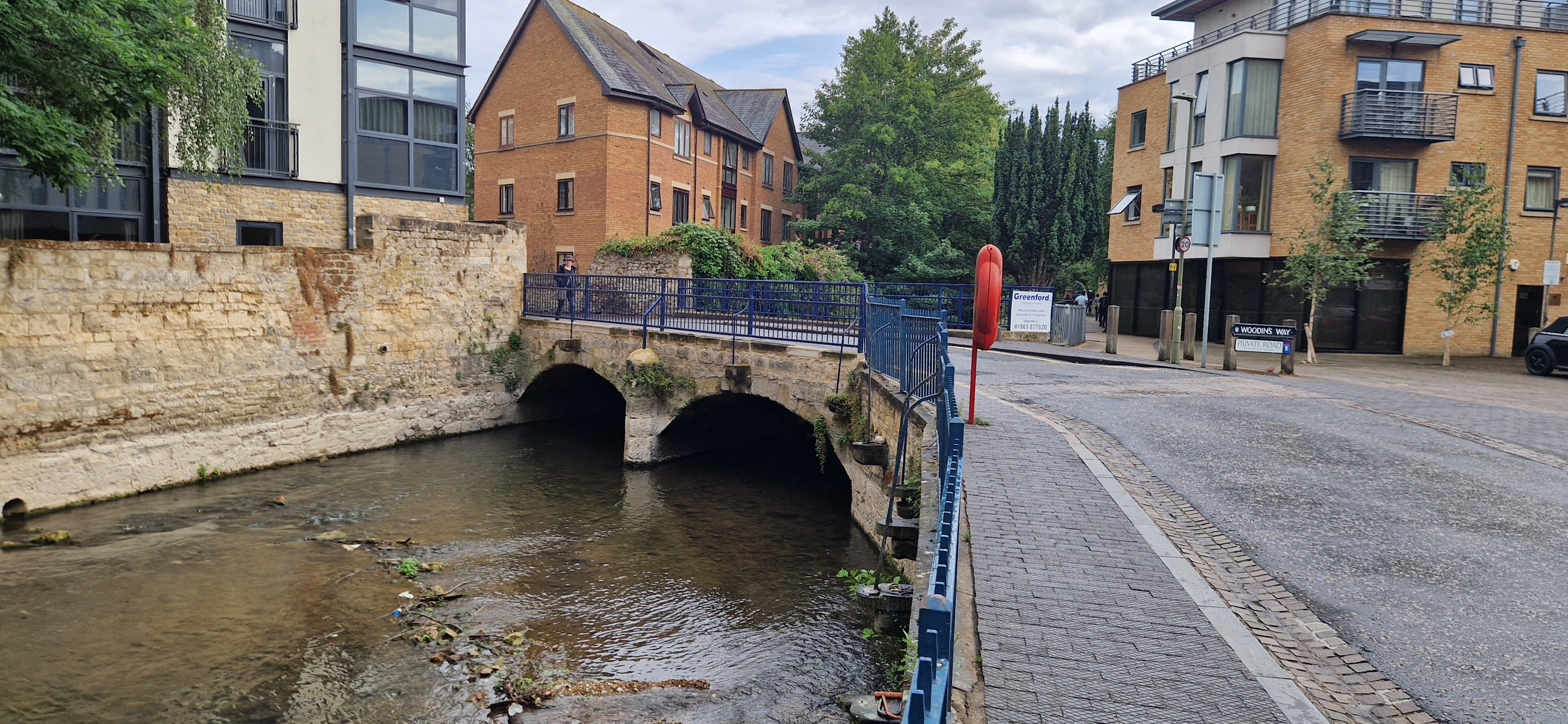
Swan Bridge, seen from upstream

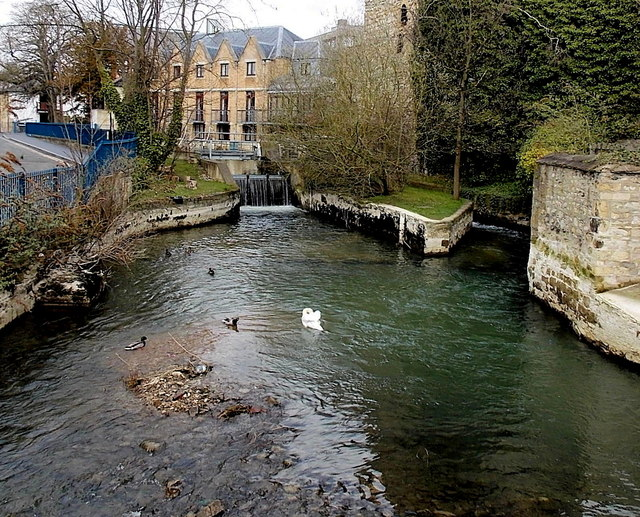
The view from Swan Bridge, looking upstream

Swan Bridge, also known as Castle Mill Bridge, carries Paradise Street over the Castle Mill Stream in Oxford, England. Oxford Castle lies to the north-east, and has an entrance from Paradise Street adjacent to the bridge. To the north, the Castle Mill Stream is crossed by Quaking Bridge, whilst to the south it is crossed by a pair of footbridges before the bridge for Oxpens Road.

The bridge has two stone arches, with a cutwater on the north side, and a level roadway that is flanked by cast-iron railings. It probably dates from the early 19th century, was rebuilt in 1895, and was Grade II listed in 1972.

Nearby was the Castle Mill, established by 1086 and demolished in 1930, whose site is now marked by the pair of weirs just upstream from the bridge. The land near the bridge was historically known as the Swans’ Nest after the swans that were bred there. Swan's Nest Brewery (later the Swan Brewery) was recorded on the site in 1700.

| Next bridge upstream | Castle Mill Stream | Next bridge downstream |
| Quaking Bridge | Swan Bridge; Grid reference SP509061 | |
