= Hythe Bridge Street =

Street in central Oxford, England

Coordinates: 51.7534°N 1.2655°W

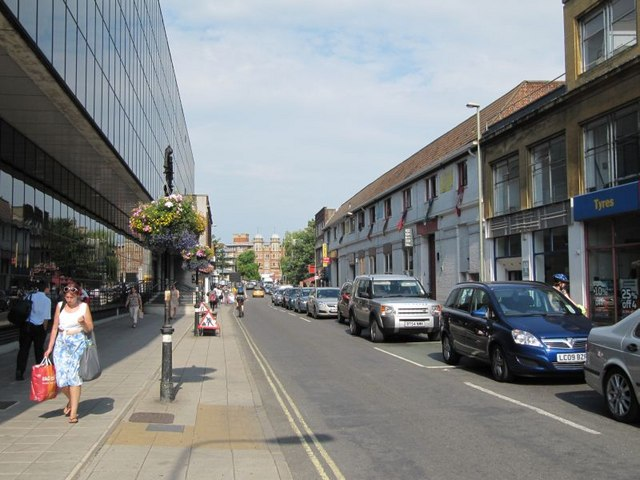
View east along Hythe Bridge Street with Beaver House on the left.

Location of Hythe Bridge Street in Oxford

Hythe Bridge Street is in the west of central Oxford, England, forming part of the A4144 road.

== History ==
There has been a road here since at least 1233. Previous names include Hide Brigge, Hithe Brigge, and Rewley Lane. It used to form part of the road between Oxford and Witney to the west.

The name "Hythe" is derived from the "hithe" (wharf) that used to be located by the bridge on Hythe Bridge Street. "Hithe" is a Saxon word that means a landing place.

== Location ==
The street links Frideswide Square and then Botley Road (A420) to the east (at the junction with Hollybush Row, which continues becoming Oxpens Road) and Worcester Street (also the A4144) at the western end leading north, at the junction with George Street. Parallel to Hythe Bridge Street to the south is Park End Street.

To the north at the eastern end of the street is Worcester College, one of the colleges of Oxford University. To the north at the western end is Beaver House, which until May 2011 contained the head office of Blackwell's Booksellers, the leading academic bookseller in Oxford, also with further shops countrywide. Carfax Tutorial Establishment is at 39–42 Hythe Bridge Street. The Bridge is a night club at No. 6–9. There are also a number of restaurants and other shops in the street. It forms a part of the main arterial route into central Oxford from the west and as such is normally very busy with traffic.

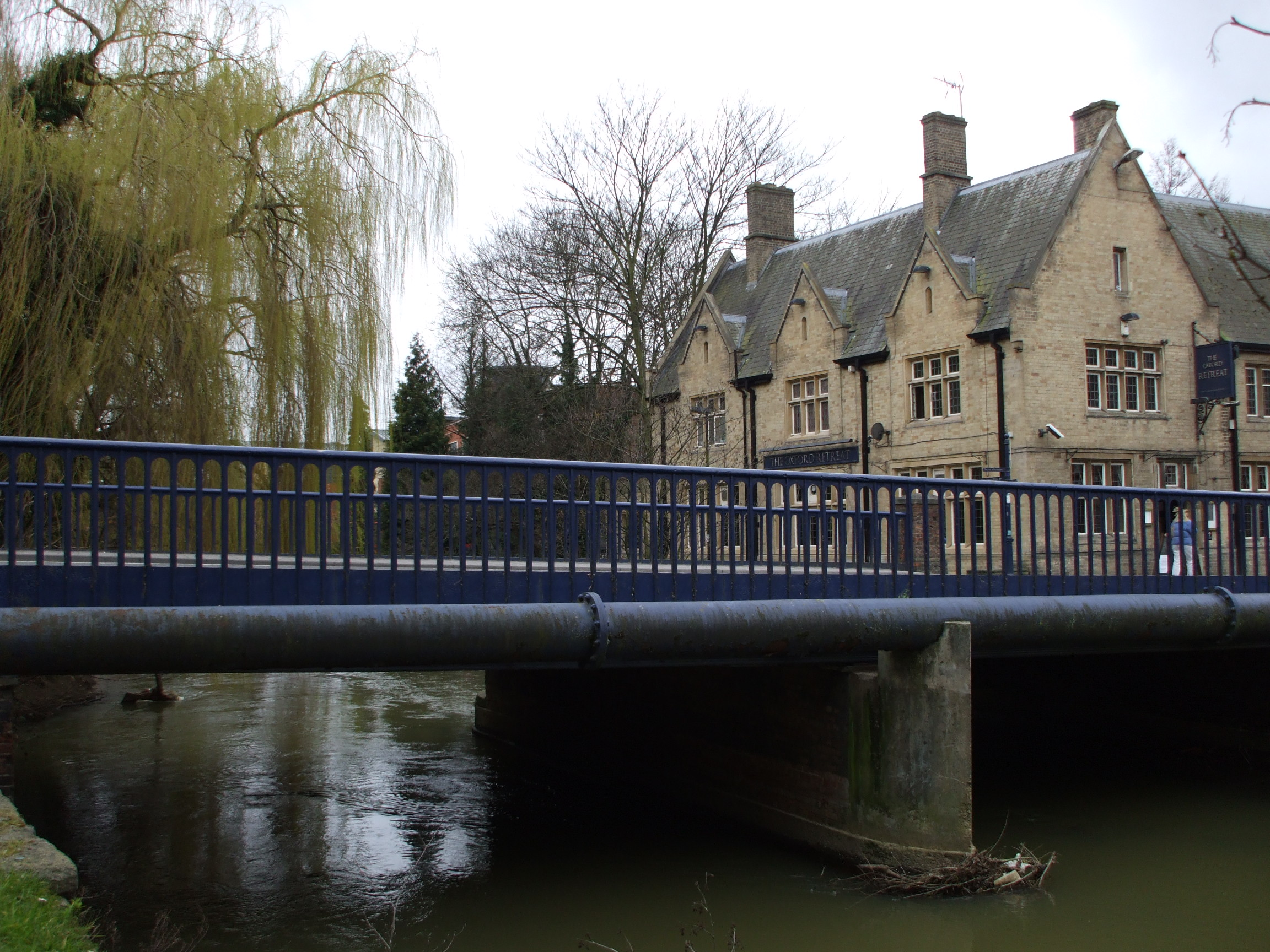
View of Hythe Bridge on Hythe Bridge Street

Hythe Bridge, a flat late 19th century cast iron bridge on Hythe Bridge Street constructed in 1861, spans the Castle Mill Stream, a backwater of the River Thames. Just to the northeast is the southern end of the Oxford Canal. This used to continue south of Hythe Bridge Street to a basin that is now filled in to form a car park.

== Buildings ==
The Cistercian house Rewley Abbey, founded in 1280, was located north of Hythe Bridge Street on the banks of one of the branches of the River Thames. Virtually all the original buildings have disappeared, but there is still a 15th-century doorway in a wall on the west side of the Oxford Canal, within a housing development.

Beaver House was erected in 1971–72, designed by the Oxford Architects Partnership. It is clad in reeded concrete with a glass curtain wall facing Hythe Bridge Street. It was built to serve as the headquarters for Blackwell's Library Bookselling and Periodicals Divisions.

The Gloucester Green area beyond the eastern end of Hythe Bridge Street was redeveloped in 1987–90, with buildings clad in red brick, with patterns in different colours. Three domed turrets can be seen along Hythe Bridge Street, which have been described as "Disney-like".

The architectural partnership of Maguire and Murray designed the Linbury Building in Worcester College, completed in 1991. Its pyramid-roofed turrets can be seen over a stone wall on the north side of Hythe Bridge Street at the eastern end.

== Gallery ==
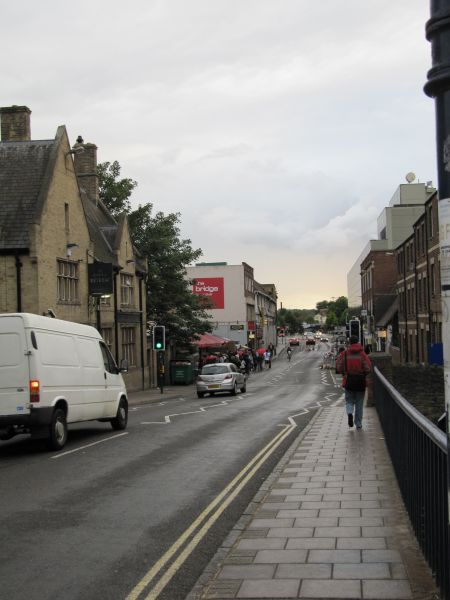
View east from the bridge along Hythe Bridge Street.

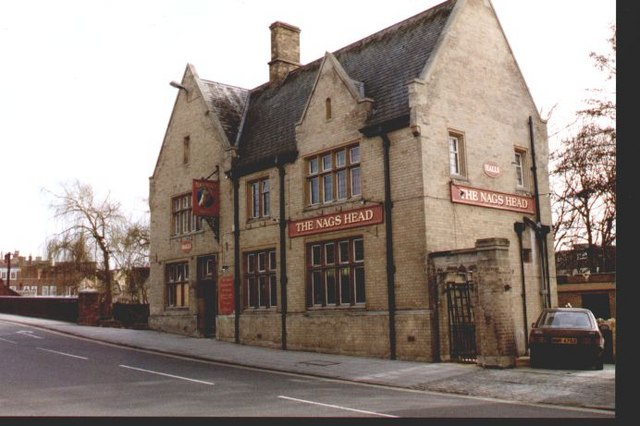
The Nags Head, a former public house on Hythe Bridge Street in 1992, close to Hythe Bridge.

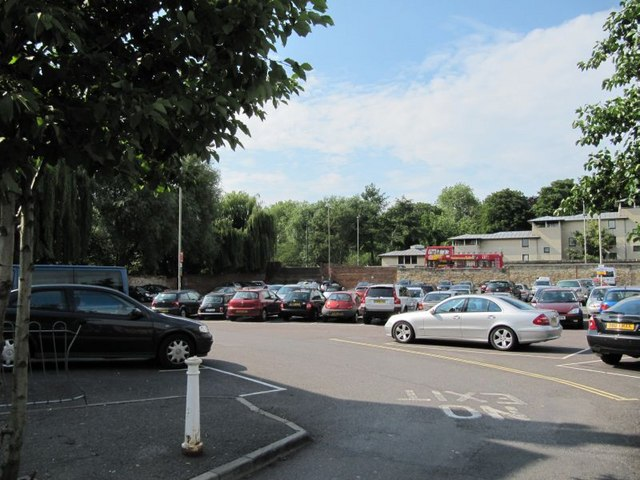
Car park to the south of the eastern end of Hythe Bridge Street. This area used to be the basin at the end of the Oxford Canal.

== Bibliography ==
- Tyack, Geoffrey (1998). Oxford: An architectural Guide. Oxford University Press. pp. 21, 331, 335, 340. ISBN 0-19-817419-5.
