= Daniel Harris (architect) =

English architect (c. 1761–1840)

- Born: about 1761
- Died: 13 June 1840 (aged 79); Oxford, England
- Occupation: Architect
- Buildings: Braziers Park House, Ipsden, Wyaston House, Oxford
- Projects: Oxford Prison enlargement, Thames locks at Osney, Godstow, Pinkhill and Sandford-on-Thames, Oxford Canal wharves at Worcester Street & New Road, Abingdon Prison.

Daniel Harris (c. 1761 – 13 June 1840) was an English builder, prison governor, civil engineer, and architect prominent in Oxford.

== Family ==
Harris's birthplace is obscure but he was born about 1761, as the entry in St-Peter-le-Bailey's register for his death in 1840 records his age as 79. He married Elizabeth Tomkins of Oxford in 1789, and they had four daughters between 1791 and 1801. Harris died at his home in New Road, Oxford in June 1840.

== Career ==
Harris came to Oxford as a journeyman carpenter and rose to become Governor of Oxford Castle and Prison from 1786 until 1809. He developed a contracting business with convict labour, supplemented by hiring wage-earning tradesmen.

Harris became involved in waterway engineering, starting by being the contractor to extend the Oxford Canal in Oxford from Hayfield Road to Worcester Street and build the Worcester Street wharves 1788–1789. He built four pound locks to replace flash locks, the first being Osney Lock for the Thames Navigation Commission in 1790. In central Oxford the Oxford Canal and the River Thames were originally linked by a flash lock at Hythe Bridge. In 1795–1797, Harris replaced it with Isis Lock, a broad lock to allow Thames barges in and out of the Oxford Canal Company's Worcester Street wharves. None of Harris's pound locks survives in the form in which he built them. The Oxford Canal rebuilt Isis Lock as a narrow lock in 1844, and all of his Thames locks have been either rebuilt or replaced.

From 1812 until 1837, Harris worked in partnership with the architect John Plowman.

== Work ==
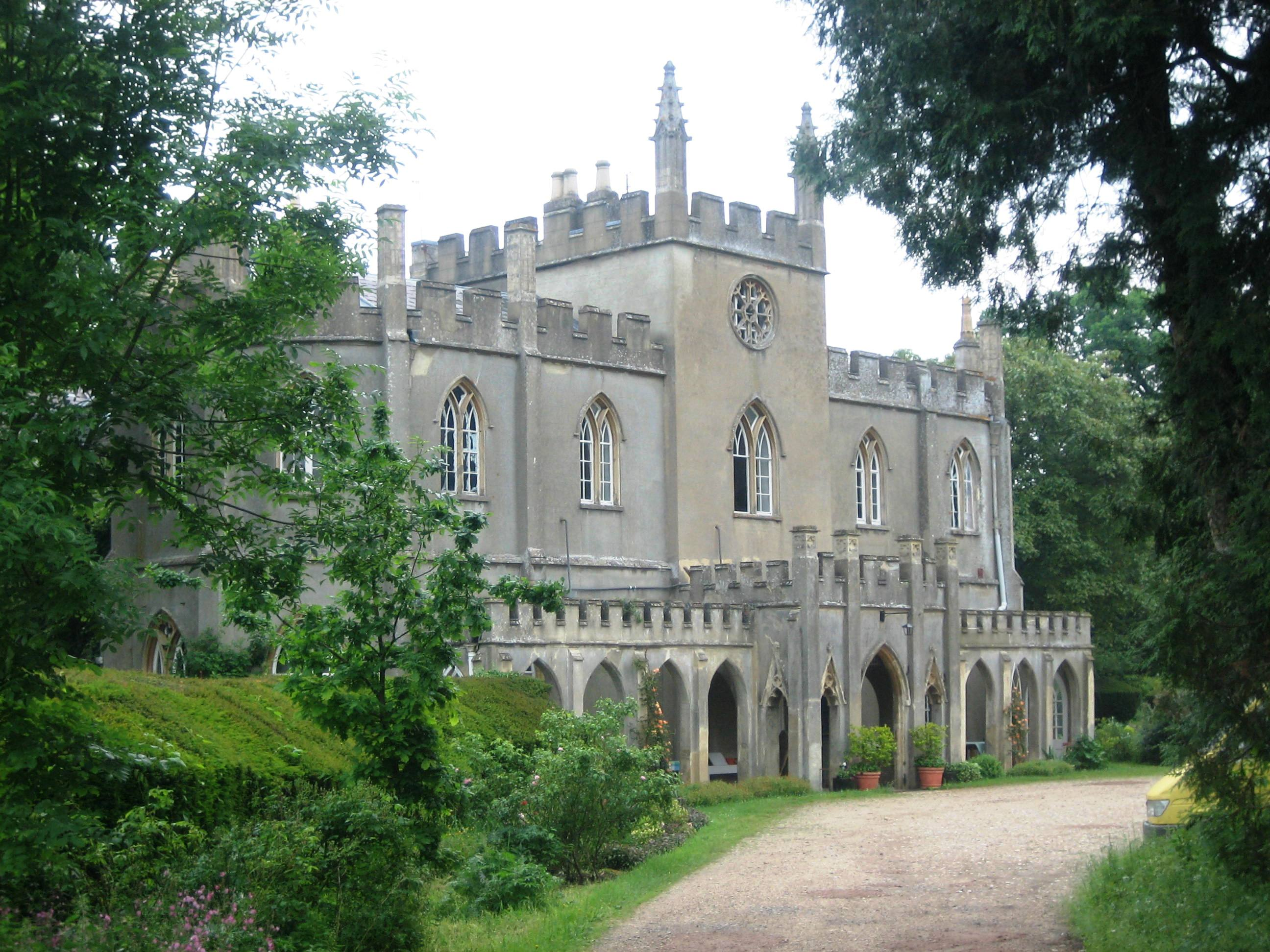
Braziers Park House, Ipsden, which Harris re-fronted in 1799

- Oxford Prison, Oxford: enlargement, 1785–1805 (to designs by William Blackburn)
- Oxford Canal, Oxford: Worcester Street Wharf, 1788–89
- River Thames, Oxfordshire: Osney Lock, Oxford, 1790
- River Thames, Oxfordshire: Godstow Lock, Godstow, 1790
- River Thames, Oxfordshire: Pinkhill Lock, Farmoor, 1791
- Oxford Canal, Oxford: New Road Wharf, Oxford, 1793 and 1801
- River Thames, Oxfordshire: Sandford Lock, Sandford-on-Thames, 1795
- Oxford Canal, Oxford: Isis Lock 1795–97 (rebuilt 1844)
- Wyaston House, New Inn Hall Street, Oxford 1795–97 (for the Oxford Canal Navigation Company) (now Linton House, part of St Peter's College, Oxford)
- Braziers Park House, Ipsden, Oxfordshire: re-fronting, 1799
- Saint Mary's parish, Bampton, Oxfordshire: alterations to rectory, 1799
- Saint Botolph's parish, Swyncombe, Oxfordshire: rectory, 1803
- Abingdon Prison, Abingdon, Oxfordshire, 1805–11 (to designs by Jeffry Wyattville)
- Saint Mary Magdalene parish, Stoke Talmage, Oxfordshire: extension to rectory, 1820

== Sources ==
- Colvin, H.M. (1997). A Biographical Dictionary of British Architects, 1600–1840. New Haven: Yale University Press. pp. 484–485. ISBN 0-300-07207-4.
- Davies, Mark; Robinson, Catherine (2003) [2001]. A Towpath Walk in Oxford. Oxford: Oxford Towpath Press. ISBN 0-9535593-1-9.
- Pevsner, Nikolaus (1966). Berkshire. The Buildings of England. Harmondsworth: Penguin Books. p. 57.
- Sherwood, Jennifer; Pevsner, Nikolaus (1974). Oxfordshire. The Buildings of England. Harmondsworth: Penguin Books. ISBN 0-14-071045-0.
- Thacker, Fred. S. (1968) [1920]. The Thames Highway: Volume II Locks and Weirs. Newton Abbot: David & Charles.
- Tyack, Geoffrey (1998). Oxford An Architectural Guide. Oxford & New York: Oxford University Press. p. 202. ISBN 0-19-817423-3.
