= Turning basin =

Body of water that allows large ships to turn

A turning basin, winding basin or swinging basin is a wider body of water, either located at the end of a ship canal or in a port to allow cargo ships to turn and reverse their direction of travel, or to enable long narrow barges in a canal to turn a sharp corner.

For a complete 180-degree turnaround, the width of the basin must be more than the length of the longest vessel normally traversing the waterway. Onboard bow thrusters or tugboats may assist in manoeuvering the ship.

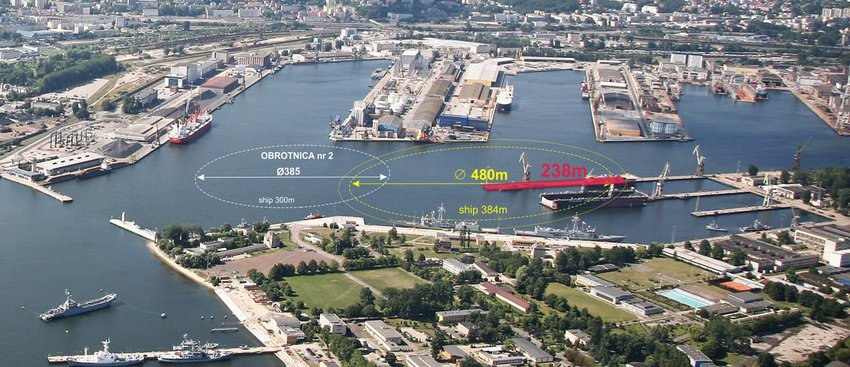
Turning basin in the port of Gdynia, Poland

In seaports the turning basin is often not a real physical basin, but a designated area in the harbour basin where turning is possible and mooring is prohibited. In the example from Gdynia the plan is to enlarge the existing turning basin by removing a part of an existing quay (shown in red in the image).

== Dimensions ==
PIANC guideline 141 recommends a turning basin diameter for channels of 1.2 times the ship's length; in China, twice the ship's length is used. For seagoing vessels, PIANC guideline 121 recommends a diameter of 2 times the ship's length if tug assistance is present. Without tugboats, three times the ship's length is recommended. The Spanish guidelines for turning basins for seagoing vessels provide very specific dimensions for different types of manoeuvres that may occur at a turning basin in a seaport.

== Examples ==
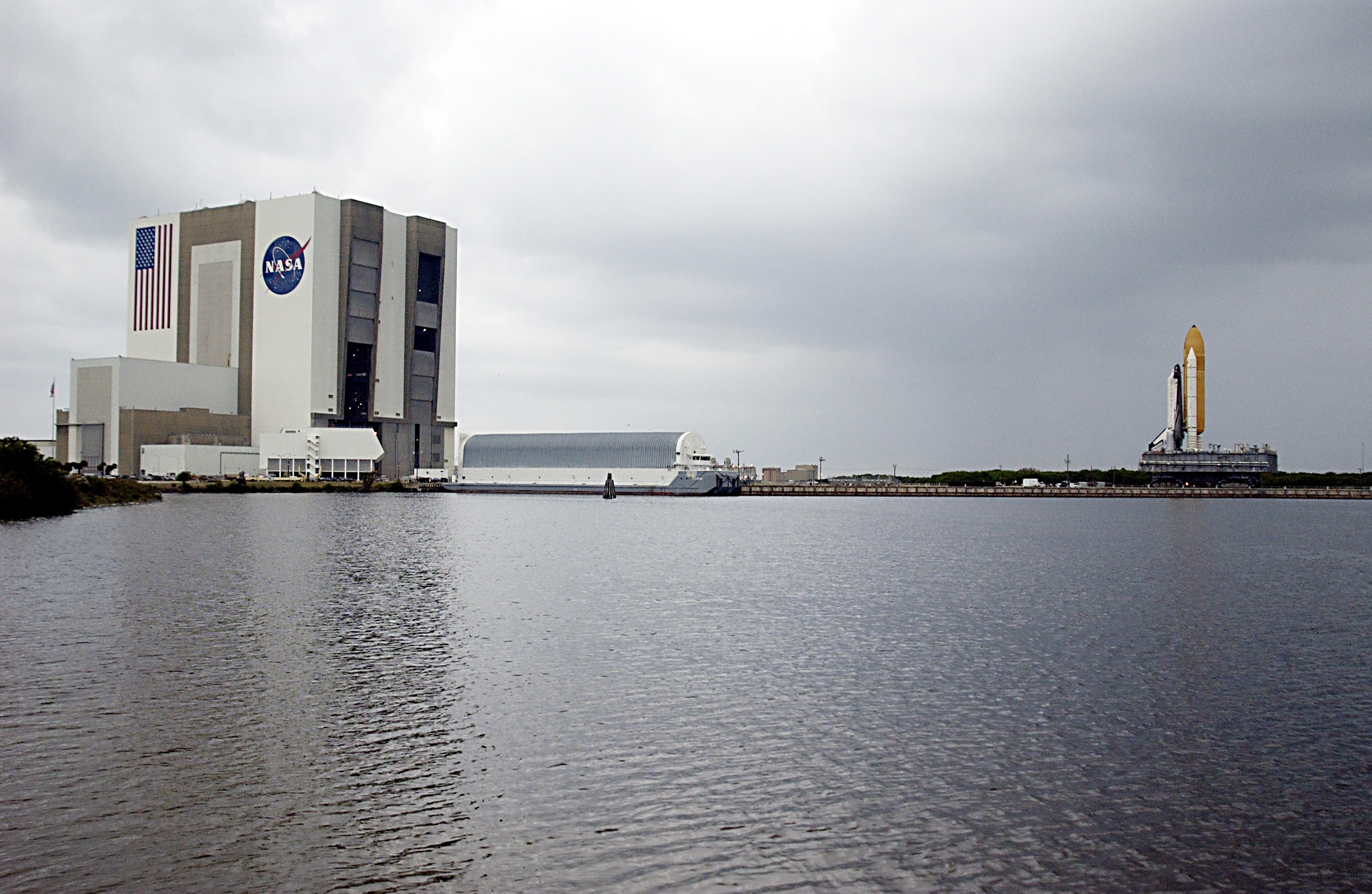
The Pegasus barge docked in the turning basin beside the Vehicle Assembly Building at the Kennedy Space Center

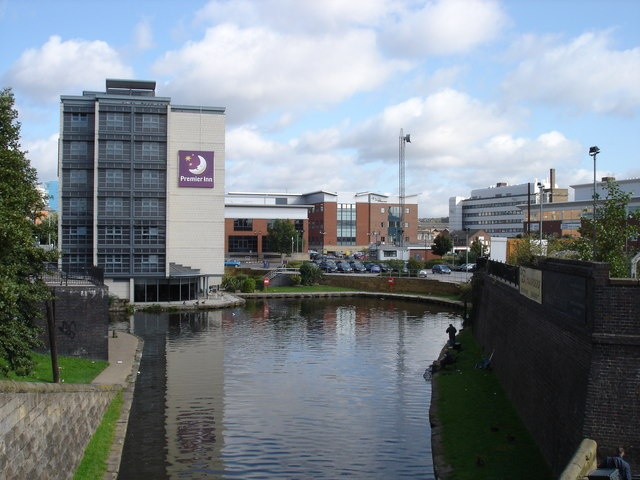
The Nottingham Canal turns at right-angles at this point, so this basin was built to allow narrowboats to negotiate the turn.

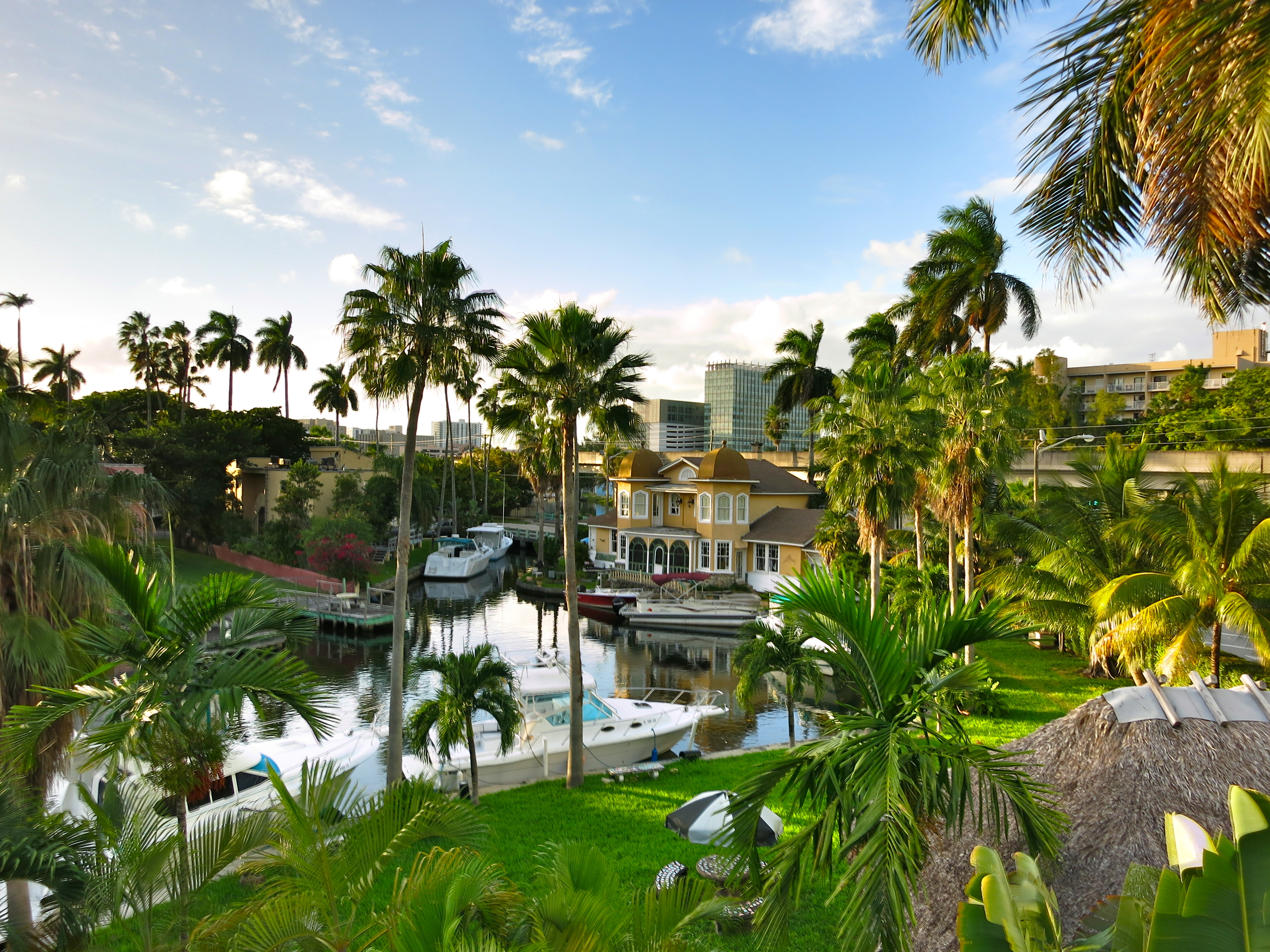
The Seybold Canal's turning basin for smaller pleasure craft in Miami, Florida

== See also ==
- Canal basin
- Winding hole
