= Winding hole =

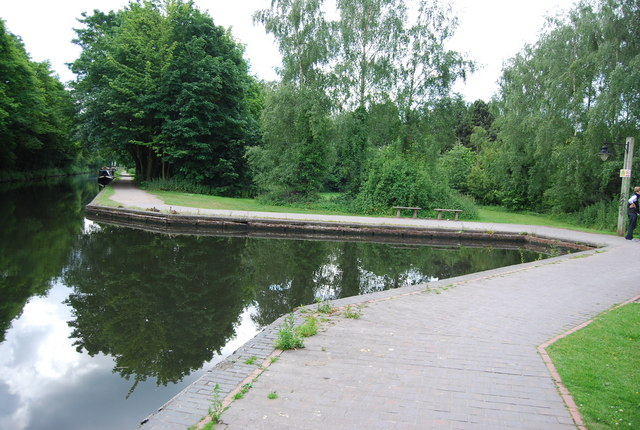
A winding hole on the Worcester and Birmingham Canal

A winding hole (/ˈwɪndɪŋ/) is a widened area of a canal (usually in the United Kingdom), used for turning a canal boat such as a narrowboat. In sea ports an area for turning ships is usually called a turning basin.

== Etymology ==
The word is commonly believed to derive from the practice of using the wind to assist with the turn.

Another etymology, however, is the Old English word for turn - "windan" (pronounced with a short I, as in windlass, a handle for winding (long I) gears)). Much UK canal terminology comes from spoken rather than written tradition and from bargees who did not read or write.

It is also possible that the word has a similar derivation to that of the windlass, which derives from the Old Norse "vinda" and "ás"—words currently used in Iceland—where the modern word for "windlass" is "vinda".

== History ==
Because the average width of a canal channel (30 to 40 feet or 9 to 12 metres) is less than the length of a full-size narrow boat (72 feet or 22 metres), it is not usually possible to turn a boat in the canal. Winding holes are typically indentations in the off-side (non-towpath side) of the canal, allowing sufficient space to turn the boat, but can be on either side of the canal.

== Use ==
A winding hole consists of a "notch" in the canal bank. A turning boat inserts its bow into the notch and swings the stern round. In the days of horse-drawn boats, this was accomplished using bargepoles.

== See also ==
- Canals of the United Kingdom
- History of the British canal system
