= Stoke Talmage =

Village in Oxfordshire, England

Coordinates: 51.688°N 1.021°W

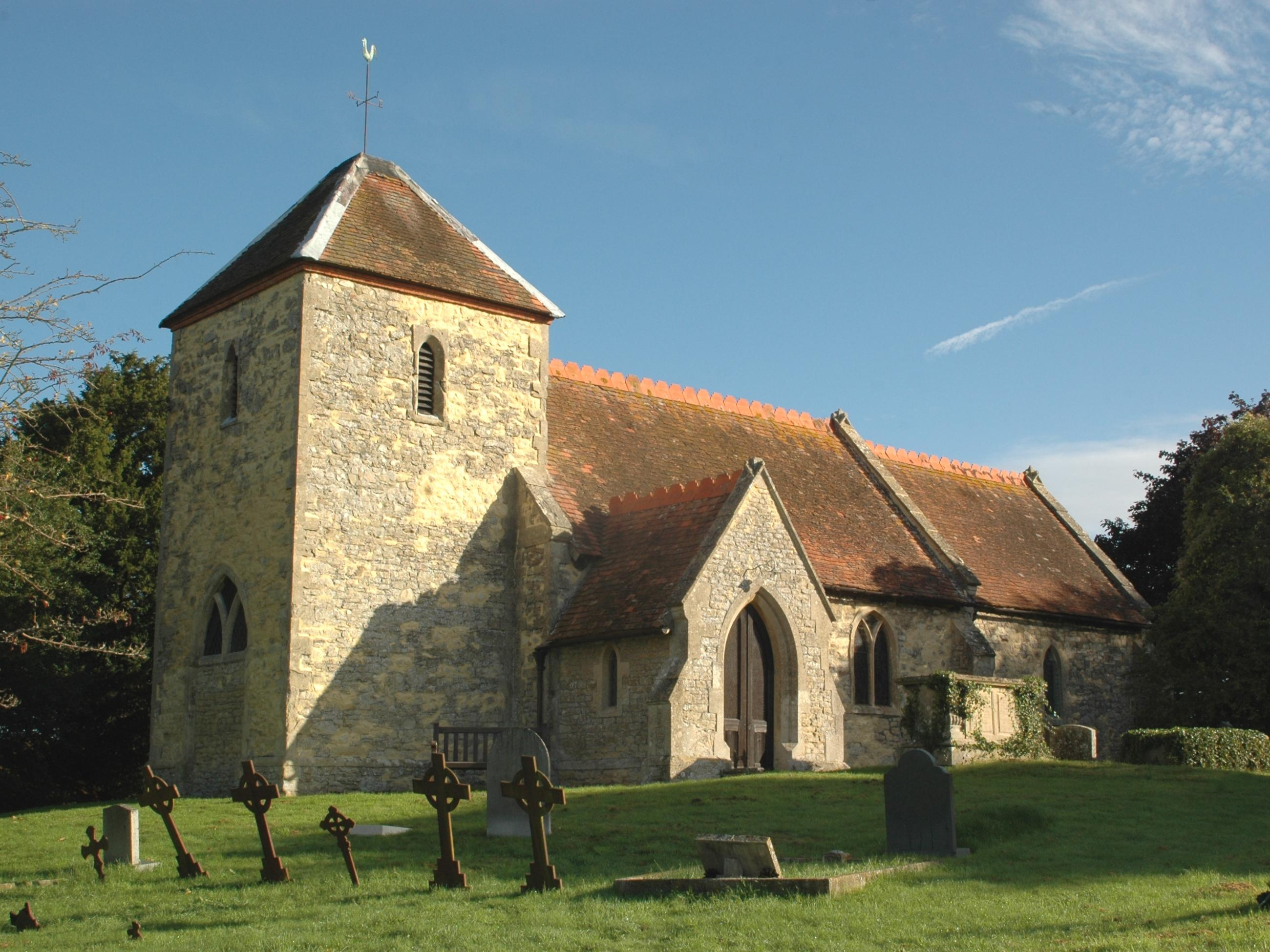
- St Mary Magdalene parish church

- Location within Oxfordshire
- Population: 49 (2001 Census)
- OS grid reference: SU6799
- Civil parish: Stoke Talmage
- District: South Oxfordshire
- Shire county: Oxfordshire
- Region: South East
- Country: England
- Sovereign state: United Kingdom
- Post town: Thame
- Postcode district: OX9
- Dialling code: 01844
- Police: Thames Valley
- Fire: Oxfordshire
- Ambulance: South Central
- UK Parliament: Henley and Thame

Stoke Talmage is a village and civil parish 4 1/2 miles (7 km) south of Thame in Oxfordshire. The 2001 Census recorded the parish population as 49. Because the parish population is below 100, the 2011 Census combined its figures with the output area for the civil parishes of Adwell and Shirburn.

== Notable buildings ==
Stoke Talmage seems to have had a parish church since the 11th century, although the first clear historical reference to it dates from 1219. The Church of England parish church of Saint Mary Magdalene was restored in 1758. In 1860 it was restored again and extended to plans by George Gilbert Scott. St Mary Magdalene Rectory was built in 1752. It was extended in 1820 by the builder and architect Daniel Harris.

== Sources and further reading ==
- Ekwall, Eilert (1960) [1936]. Concise Oxford Dictionary of English Place-Names (4th ed.). Oxford: Oxford University Press. Stoke. ISBN 0198691033.
- Lobel, Mary D, ed. (1964). "Stoke Talmage". A History of the County of Oxford. Victoria County History. Vol. 8: Lewknor and Pyrton Hundreds. London: Oxford University Press for the Institute of Historical Research. pp. 198–210.
- Sherwood, Jennifer; Pevsner, Nikolaus (1974). Oxfordshire. The Buildings of England. Harmondsworth: Penguin Books. pp. 789–790. ISBN 0-14-071045-0.
