= Oxpens Road =

Road in Oxford, England

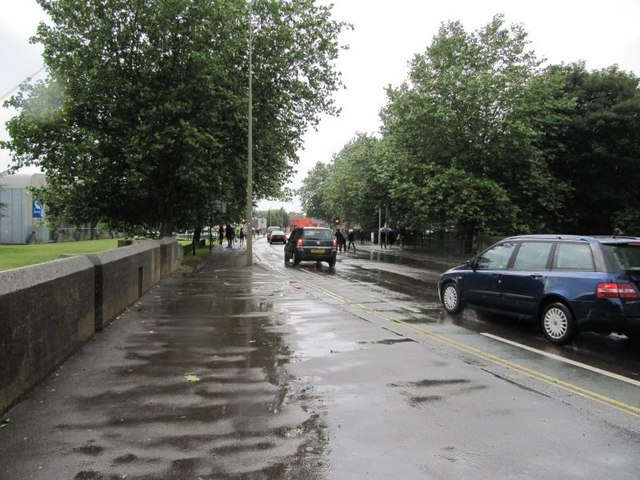
- View northwest along Oxpens Road
- Interactive map of Oxpens Road
- Length: 0.3 mi (0.48 km)
- Postal code: OX1 1
- Coordinates: 51°44′59″N 1°15′58″W
- northwest end: Hollybush Row
- southeast end: Thames Street

Oxpens Road is a road in central Oxford, England, linking west and south Oxford. It is named after the marshy area of Oxpens, next to one of the branches of the River Thames in Oxford. It forms part of the A420 road.

== Locale ==
To the northwest, Oxpens Road becomes Hollybush Row, meeting at Frideswide Square, forming the major junction of the Botley Road, Park End Street and Hythe Bridge Street near the Saïd Business School and Oxford railway station (to the west of the city centre). To the southeast it becomes Thames Street, just north of the River Thames, and meets the junction with the south end of St Aldates near Christ Church Meadow (to the south of the city centre). It forms part of an inner ring road for the southwest part of the centre of Oxford.

Halfway along is the Oxford Ice Rink, a distinctive 1984 building by Nicholas Grimshaw, which is the home of the Oxford City Stars ice hockey team. One of the campuses of the City of Oxford College is located here on the north side. The road crosses the southern end of the Castle Mill Stream just before it reaches the River Thames.

Oxpens Road also provides access to major car parks for the centre of Oxford, including the Westgate Shopping Centre. A redeveloped and greatly expanded shopping centre opened in 2017, but there have been concerns over the imposing and largely windowless wall at the southwest of the redevelopment on Oxpens Road by conservationists, including the Oxford Civic Society.

== History ==
Before 1850, Oxpens Road was known as Nun's Walk. This area used to be the location of a gasworks by the river.

The locality was one of the poorer quarters of central Oxford. In the 1950s and 1960s there was large-scale clearance of the area, known as The Oxpens. Many residents were moved to Blackbird Leys, an estate consisting largely of council housing on the outskirts of southeast Oxford and close to Morris Motors Limited in Cowley, which provided employment. The area around Oxpens was almost entirely redeveloped during the second half of the 20th century.

Close to Oxpens Road on St Thomas Street was the Morrells Brewery (aka The Lion Brewery), near the Castle Mill Stream, which closed in 1998. Nearby are the Christ Church Old Buildings, a early experiment in social housing dating from 1866.

== Gallery ==
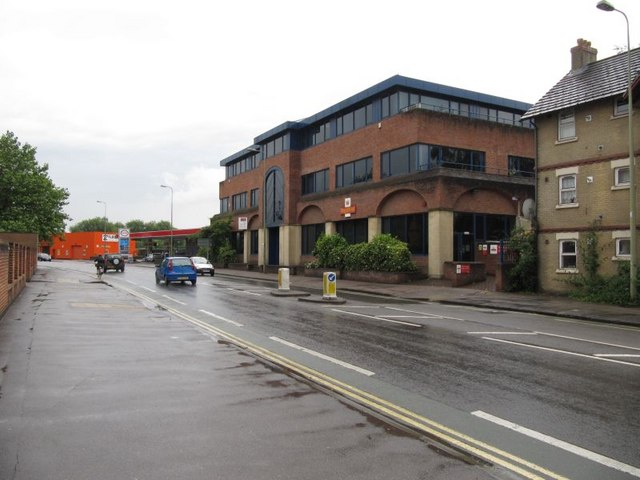
View southeast along Oxpens Road.

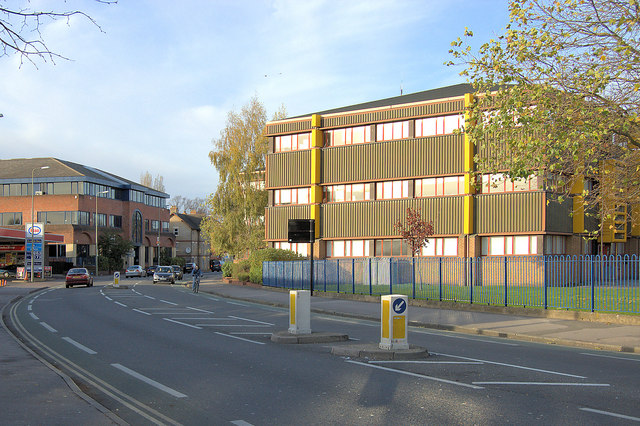
View northwest along Oxpens Road.

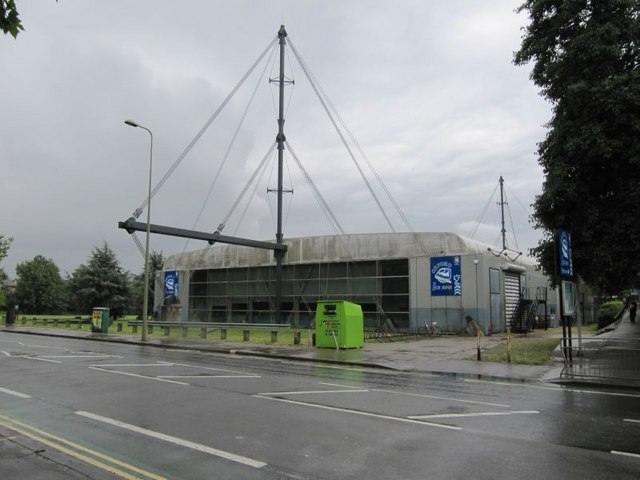
Oxford Ice Rink on Oxpens Road.

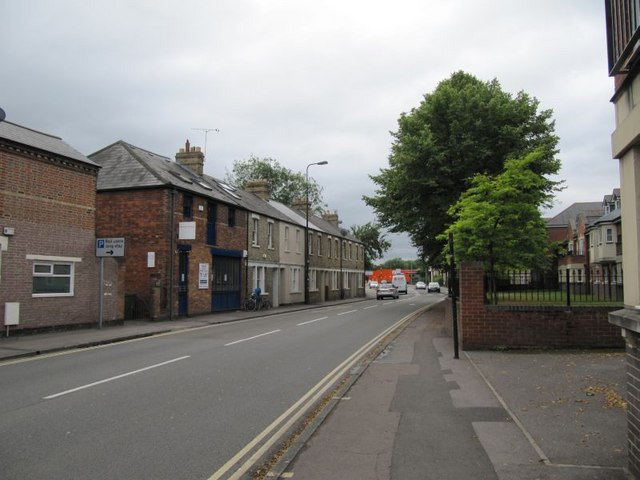
View down Hollybush Row towards Oxpens Road.

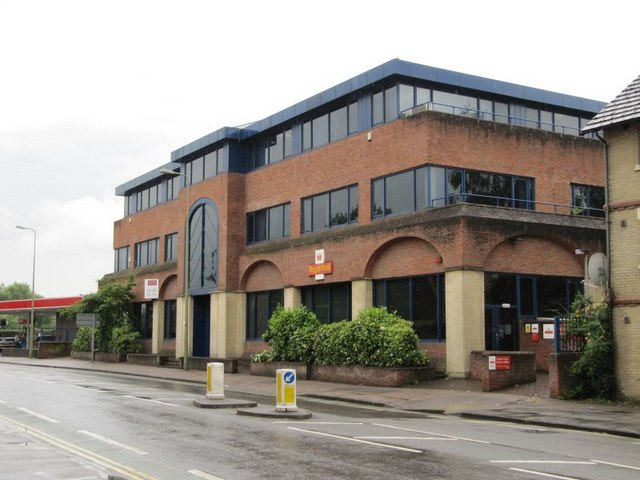
Post office building on Oxpens Road.

== See also ==
- St Ebbes

Next crossing upstream	Castle Mill Stream	Next crossing downstream
Swan Bridge	Oxpens Road; Grid reference SP509058	none
