= Hythe Bridge =

Bridge in Oxford, England

Coordinates: 51.7535°N 1.2650°W

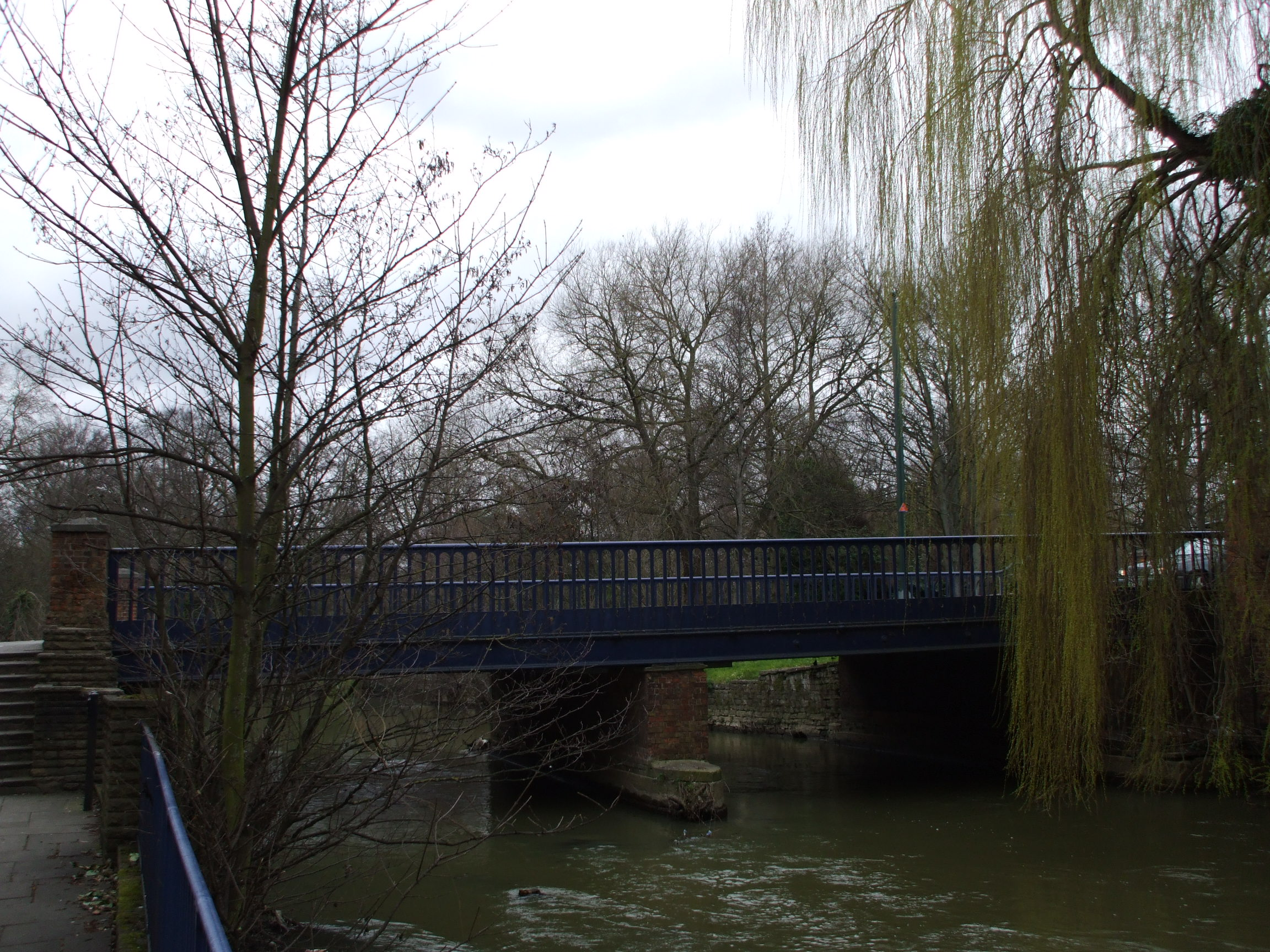
The Castle Mill Stream flowing under Hythe Bridge.

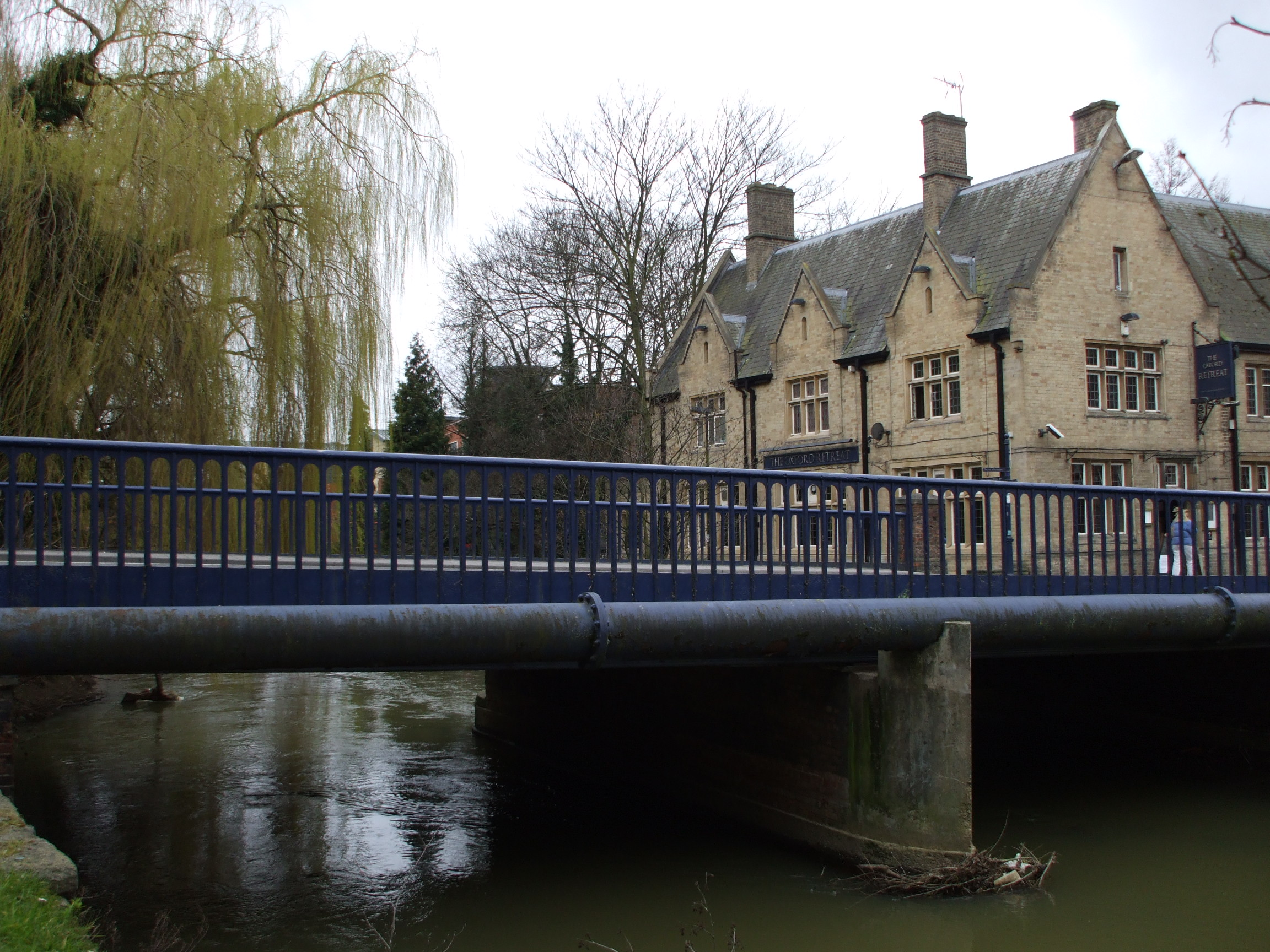
Hythe Bridge and the Oxford Retreat pub, viewed from the north.

Hythe Bridge (formerly known as High Bridge) is a Victorian flat cast iron beamed bridge on Hythe Bridge Street in the west of central Oxford, England. It spans the Castle Mill Stream, a backwater of the River Thames. Hythe Bridge forms part of the main arterial route west of Oxford. It lies on the A4144, which continues west as the Botley Road (A420).

The first bridge here, probably of wooden construction, was built by Oseney Abbey in 1200–10. A stone bridge was built in 1383. It was a round-arched bridge with three arches. The current iron bridge was designed by John Galpin, an Oxford-based engineer, in 1861. The name "Hythe" is derived from the "hithe" (wharf) that used to be located by the bridge. "Hithe" is a Saxon word that means a landing place.

Immediately to the northeast of Hythe Bridge is the current southern end of the Oxford Canal. This used to continue south of Hythe Bridge Street to a basin with wharves that in 1951 was filled in and is now a car park and part of Nuffield College.

Next bridge upstream	Castle Mill Stream	Next bridge downstream
Cherwell Valley Line railway bridge	Hythe Bridge; Grid reference SP508064	Pacey's Bridge
