= Charles Buckeridge =

British architect (c. 1832–1873)

- Born: 1832 or 1833
- Died: 1 September 1873
- Occupation: Architect
- Buildings: St Antony's College, Oxford

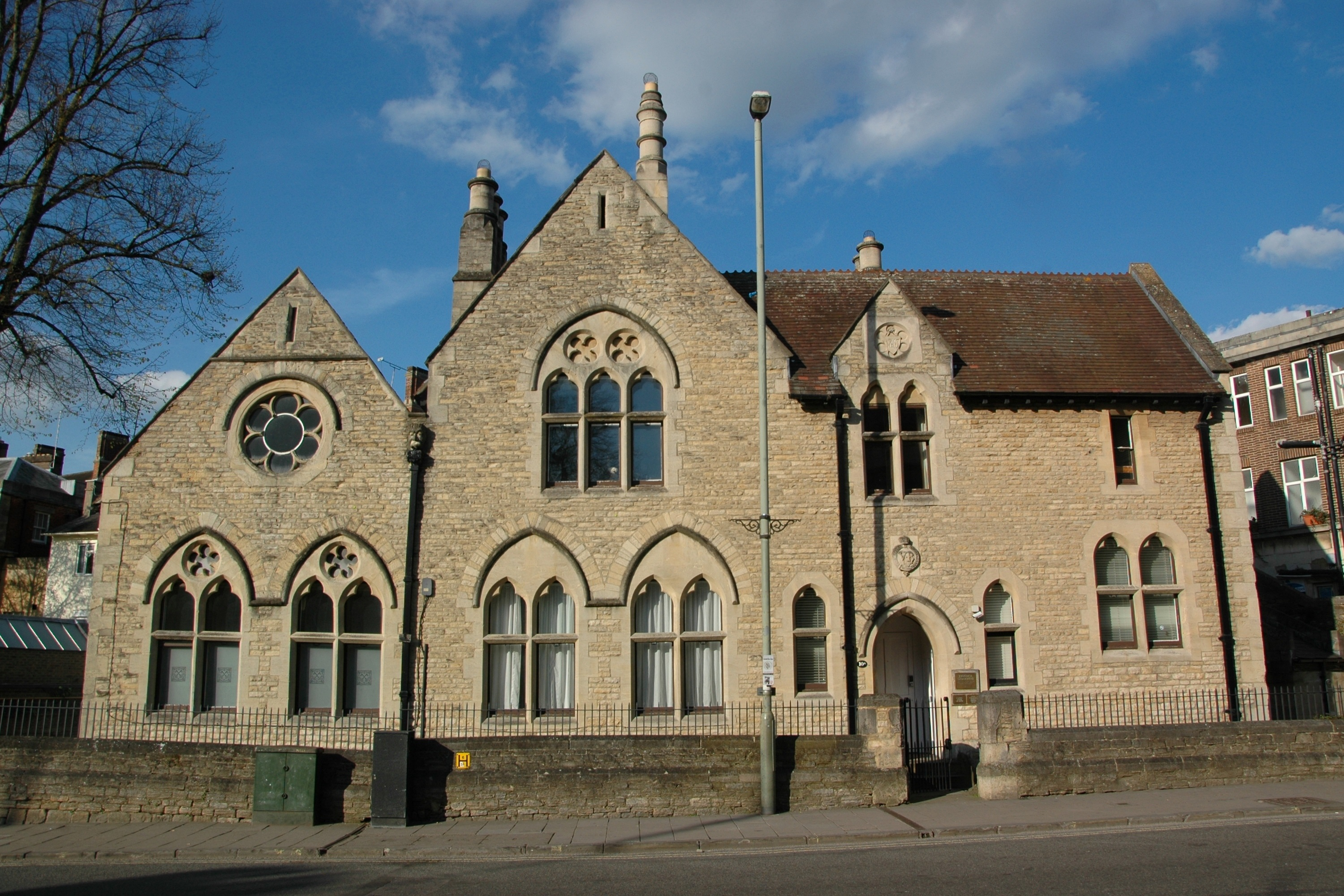
Former court house (later a probate office), New Road, Oxford (1863)

Charles Buckeridge (circa 1832–1873) was a British Gothic Revival architect who trained as a pupil of Sir George Gilbert Scott. He practised in Oxford 1856–1868 and in London from 1869. He was made an Associate of the Royal Institute of British Architects in 1861.

== Family ==
Charles was born in France, the son of Charles Elliott Buckeridge and his wife Eliza, the daughter of John Eyre of Reading, Berkshire. He grew up in Salisbury in Wiltshire. He was married and raised three sons and three daughters in Oxford, including John Hingeston Buckeridge, who was a church architect, and Charles Edgar Buckeridge (1864–1898), who painted church interiors. Charles was brother-in-law of the botanist Giles Munby.

He died of heart disease at the age of 40 on 1 September 1873 in Hampstead, and was buried at St John's Church there.

== Work ==
Much of Buckeridge's work was for parish churches and other institutions of the Church of England. Dates that Sherwood and Pevsner cite for work at Charlbury and Emmington suggest that these works, like that at Bletchingdon, were completed posthumously.

- St Cross School, Oxford, 1858 (for a time the premises of St Cross College, Oxford)
- All Saints, Mears Ashby, Northamptonshire: restoration, 1859; vicarage, 1860
- Ascot Priory, Ascot, Berkshire: buildings for the Society of the Holy Trinity, 1861
- St Mary the Virgin, Cottisford, Oxfordshire: restoration, 1861
- St Peter, Wolvercote, Oxfordshire: rebuilt church, 1862
- St Helen, Benson, Oxfordshire: new chancel, 1862
- St John the Evangelist, Little Tew, Oxfordshire: teacher's house, school and almshouses, 1862
- 10, Parks Road, Oxford: house, 1862
- 9, Norham Gardens, Oxford: house, 1862–63
- St Peter, Little Wittenham, Berkshire (now Oxfordshire): rebuilt church, 1863
- All Saints, Blackwater, Hampshire: extension, 1863
- Court House, New Road, Oxford, 1863
- Saint Swithun, Merton, Oxfordshire: restoration, 1865
- St Mary, Streatley, Berkshire: rebuilt church, 1865
- 3, Norham Gardens, Oxford: house, 1865–66
- St Peter, Radway, Warwickshire, 1866
- Society of the Holy and Undivided Trinity, Oxford: new convent, 1866–68 (now St Antony's College, Oxford)
- St Nicholas, Britwell Salome, Oxfordshire: restoration, 1867
- St Mary, Lower Heyford, Oxfordshire: remodelled Old Rectory, 1867
- St Mary, Lower Heyford, Oxfordshire: restored church, 1867–68
- All Saints, Wellingborough, Northamptonshire, 1867–68
- St Peter, Cogenhoe, Northamptonshire: restoration, 1868–69
- Holy Cross, Shipton-on-Cherwell, Oxfordshire: restoration, 1869
- St John the Evangelist, Little Tew, Oxfordshire: church tower, 1869
- St Andrew, South Stoke, Oxfordshire: Vicarage, 1869
- SS James & John chapel, Brackley, Northamptonshire: restoration, 1869–70
- St Helen, Benson, Oxfordshire: Old Vicarage, 1869–70
- Llanthony Abbey, Capel-y-ffin, 1870
- All Saints, Emscote, Warwick: font cover, 1871
- St Nicholas, Chadlington, Oxfordshire: new chancel, 1870
- Brightwell village school (now the Stewart Village Hall), 1870
- All Saints, Emscote, Warwick: font cover, 1871
- St Mary, Little Houghton, Northamptonshire: rebuilding, 1873
- St Peter, Steeple Aston, Oxfordshire: restoration, 1873
- St John's Home, Leopold Street, Oxford (now part of All Saints' Convent), 1873
- St Michael and All Angels, Clifton Hampden, Oxfordshire: reredos mosaic of the Last Supper, 1873
- St Mary the Virgin, Charlbury, Oxfordshire: new chancel, 1874
- St Nicholas, Emmington, Oxfordshire: rebuilt chancel and nave, 1874
- St Giles, Bletchingdon, Oxfordshire: restoration planned 1869 and completed posthumously in 1878.
- Salisbury Cathedral, Wiltshire: reredos paintings in north transept

== Sources ==
- Brodie, Antonia; Felstead, Alison; Franklin, Jonathan; Pinfield, Leslie; Oldfield, Jane, eds. (2001). Directory of British Architects 1834–1914, A–K. London & New York: Continuum. pp. 288–289. ISBN 0-8264-5513-1.
- Pevsner, Nikolaus (1966). Berkshire. The Buildings of England. Harmondsworth: Penguin Books.
- Pevsner, Nikolaus; Cherry, Bridget (revision) (1973) [1961]. Northamptonshire. The Buildings of England (2nd ed.). Harmondsworth: Penguin Books. ISBN 0-14-071022-1.
- Pevsner, Nikolaus; Cherry, Bridget (revision) (1975) [1963]. Wiltshire. The Buildings of England (2nd ed.). Harmondsworth: Penguin Books. p. 409. ISBN 0-14-0710-26-4.
- Pevsner, Nikolaus; Lloyd, David (1967). Hampshire and the Isle of Wight. The Buildings of England. Harmondsworth: Penguin Books. p. 280.
- Pevsner, Nikolaus; Wedgwood, Alexandra (1966). Warwickshire. The Buildings of England. Harmondsworth: Penguin Books.
- Sherwood, Jennifer; Pevsner, Nikolaus (1974). Oxfordshire. The Buildings of England. Harmondsworth: Penguin Books. ISBN 0-14-071045-0.
