= Nuffield College, Oxford =

College of the University of Oxford

Nuffield College
- University of Oxford
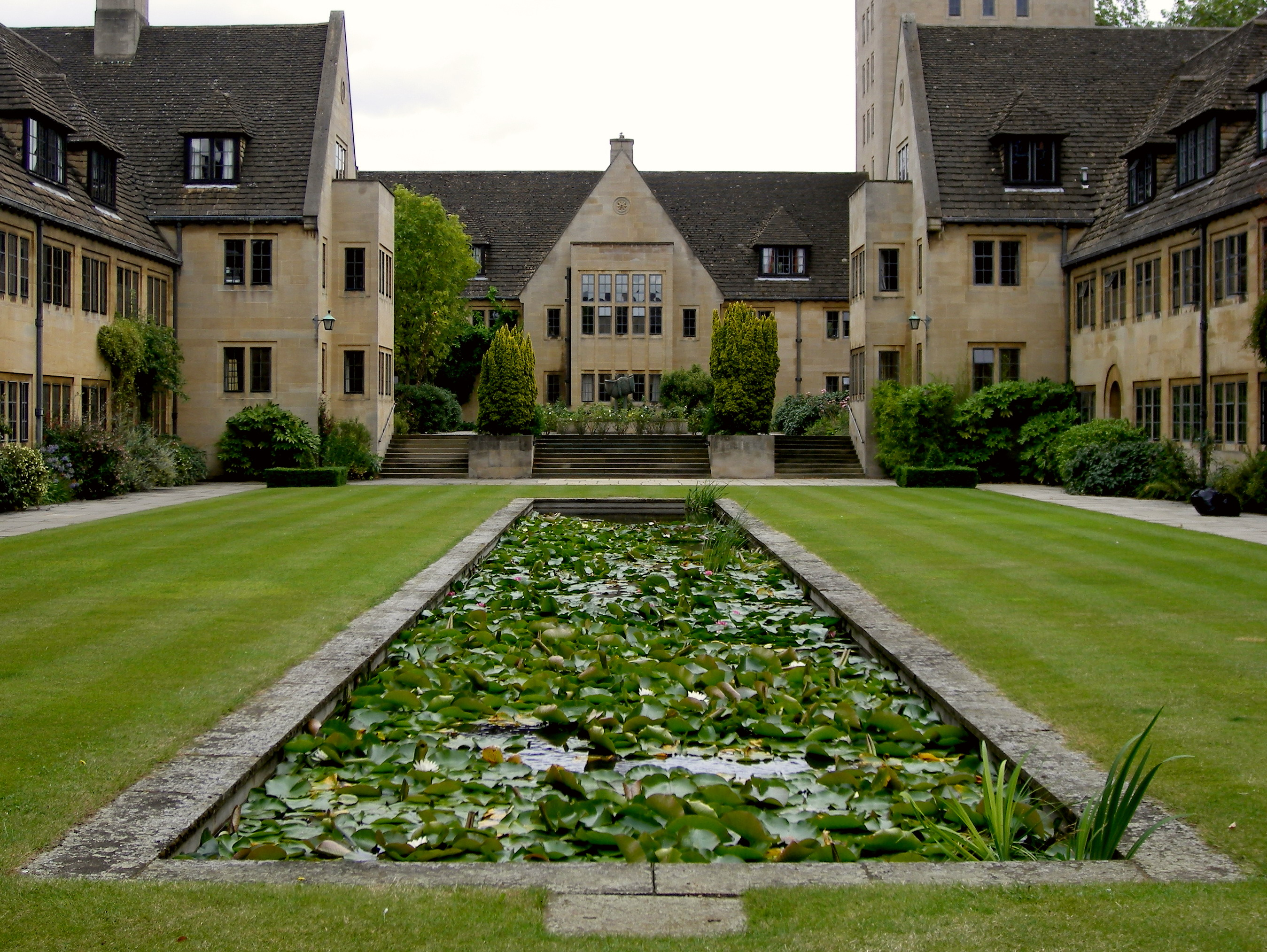
- Nuffield College Courtyard, from the west

- Arms: Ermine on a fesse or between in chief two roses gules barbed and seeded proper and in base a balance of the second three pears sable. The Crest was slightly moderated and redrawn to simplify the design in Summer 2017
- Location: New Road and Worcester Street
- Coordinates: 51.752834°N 1.262917°W
- Full name: The Warden and Fellows of Nuffield College in the University of Oxford
- Latin name: Collegium de Nuffield, Collegium Nuffield
- Motto: Fiat Justitia
- Established: 1937
- Named for: William Morris, 1st Viscount Nuffield
- Architect: Austen Harrison
- Sister college: None
- Warden: Dame Julia Black
- Undergraduates: None
- Postgraduates: 90
- Endowment: £282 million (2021)
- Website: www.nuffield.ox.ac.uk

Map
- Location within Oxford city centre

Nuffield College (/ˈnʌfiːld/) is one of the constituent colleges of the University of Oxford in England. It is a graduate college specialising in the social sciences, particularly economics, politics and sociology. Nuffield is one of Oxford's newer colleges, having been founded in 1937, as well as one of the smallest, with only around 90 students and 60 academic fellows. It was also the first Oxford college to accept both men and women, having been coeducational since foundation, as well as being the first college exclusively for graduate students in either Oxford or Cambridge.

As of 2021, the college had an estimated financial endowment of £282 million. Due to its small intake, it was the wealthiest educational institution per student in the world in 2013. Since 2017, Nuffield has committed to underwriting funding for all new students accepted to the college. Between 2019 and 2023, 5.1% of applicants to the college were admitted.

Its architecture is designed to conform to the traditional college layout and its modernist spire is a landmark for those approaching Oxford from the west.

== History ==
Nuffield College was founded in 1937 after a donation to the University of Oxford by Lord Nuffield, the industrialist and founder of Morris Motors. On 16 November 1937, the University entered a Deed of Covenant and Trust with Lord Nuffield. He donated land for the college on New Road, to the west of the city centre near the mound of Oxford Castle, on the site of the largely disused basin of the Oxford Canal. As well as the land, Nuffield gave £900,000 (Note: £900,000 in 1937 would be worth approximately £246M in today's terms, adjusting for changes in GDP.) to build the college and to provide it with an endowment. For the creation of Nuffield College and for his other donations he was described in 1949 by an editorial in The Times as "the greatest benefactor of the University since the Middle Ages".

From its inception, Nuffield College initiated a number of trends at both Oxford and Cambridge. It was the first college to have both women and men housed together. It was also the first college to consist solely of graduate students. In addition, it was the first in modern times to have a defined subject focus, namely the social sciences.

Nuffield appointed its first fellows in 1939, a group that notably included the historian Margery Perham, but the outbreak of World War II meant that the college's construction did not begin until 1949. During the War, Nuffield hosted the Nuffield College Social Reconstruction Survey, which examined issues related to post-War reconstruction. Nuffield admitted its first students in 1945, and received its Royal Charter from the hands of the Duke of Edinburgh on 6 June 1958.

Drove to Oxford for the Nuffield College dance... Nuffield is vigorous and forward-thinking. It has absolute equality between men and women and close camaraderie between teacher and student. It draws its Fellows from a wide social background. There is no snobbery about it at all.

— Tony Benn, December 7, 1957

In the 1960s, Nuffield became closely associated with Harold Wilson's "modernizing" Labour government. During his tenure as Wilson's Chancellor of the Exchequer, future Labour prime minister James Callaghan, who had no formal university education, took tutorials in economics at Nuffield overseen by College fellow Ian Little. Such was the perceived intimacy between College and government that decades later, writer Christopher Hitchens could recall the "fast set that revolved between Nuffield and Whitehall".

== Buildings ==
Nuffield is located on the site of the basin of the Oxford Canal to the west of Oxford. The land on which the college stands was formerly the city's principal canal basin and coal wharfs.

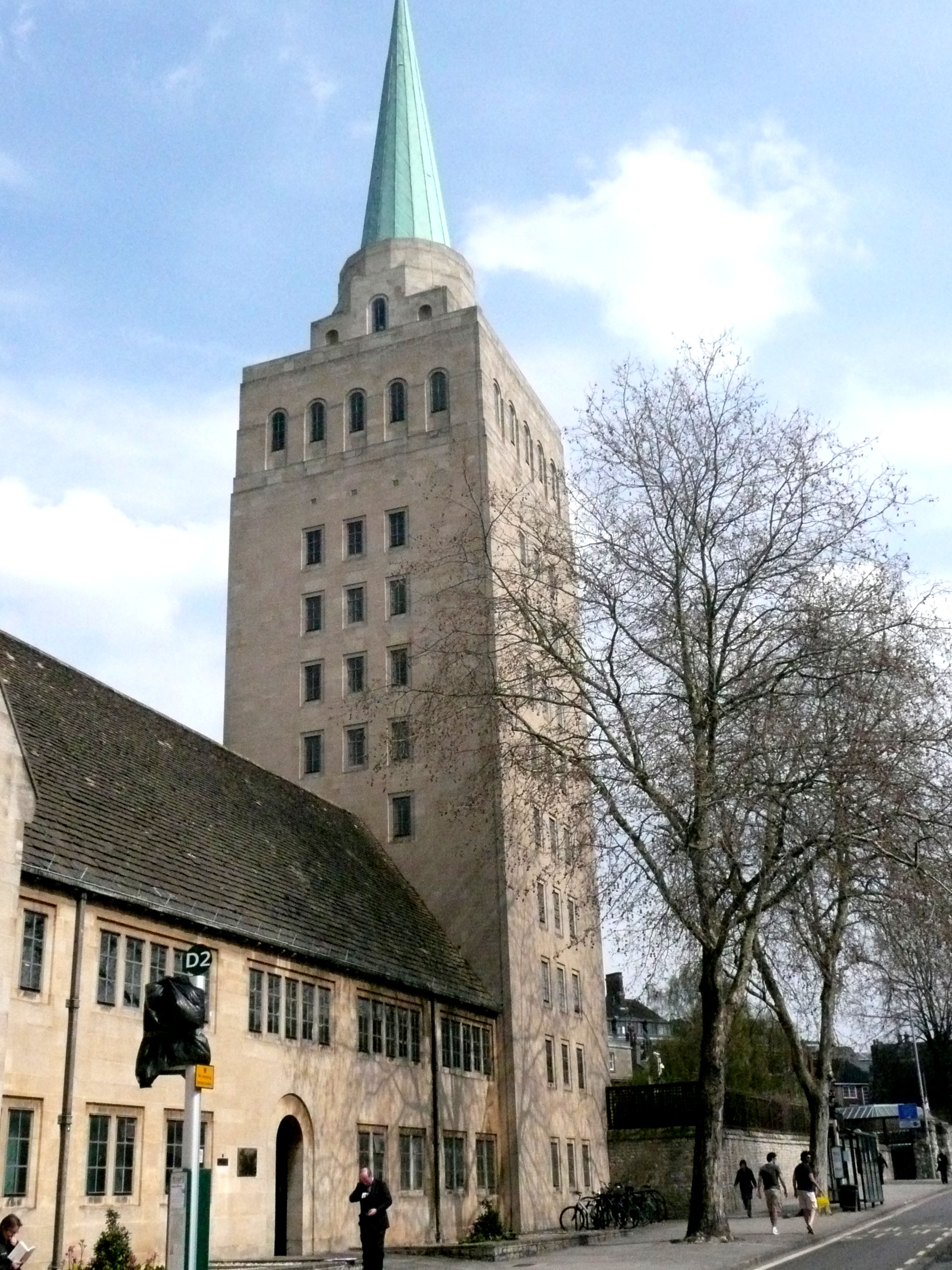
Nuffield College, facing New Road, with the library tower topped by a flèche. The main entrance to the college is in the middle of the building to the left of the tower.

The architect Austen Harrison, who had worked in Greece and British Mandatory Palestine, was appointed by the University to design the buildings. His initial design, heavily influenced by Mediterranean architecture, was rejected by Nuffield, who called it "un-English" and refused to allow his name to be associated with it. Harrison reworked the plans, aiming for "something on the lines of Cotswold domestic architecture", as Nuffield wanted. The plans were approved by Lord Nuffield in 1940. Construction of the college began after the war in 1949. Restrictions on construction after the Second World War meant that work on the college was not completed until 1960. The original plan for the college to occupy land on both sides of Worcester Street was scaled down as a result of budget and material shortages, and to this day the land to the west of the college is occupied by a "temporary" car park. In one change, the tower, which had been planned to be ornamental, was redesigned to hold the college's library. It was the first tower built in Oxford for 200 years and is about 150 feet (46 m) tall, including the flèche on top. The buildings are arranged around two quadrangles, with residential accommodation for students and fellows in one, and the hall, library and administrative offices in the other. The chapel has stained glass windows designed by John Piper.

The architectural aesthetic of the final design, particularly the tower and its flèche, has attracted some criticism; unlike the other "dreaming spires" of Oxford, Nuffield's tower is a masonry-clad steel-framed book-stack. The architectural historian Sir Howard Colvin said that Harrison's first design was Oxford's "most notable architectural casualty of the 1930s"; it has also been described as a "missed opportunity" to show that Oxford did not live "only in the past". Reaction to the architecture of the college has been largely unfavourable. In the 1960s, it was described as "Oxford's biggest monument to barren reaction". The tower has been described as "ungainly", and marred by repetitive windows. The travel writer Jan Morris wrote that the college was "a hodge-podge from the start". However, the architectural historian Sir Nikolaus Pevsner, although unimpressed with most of the college, thought that the tower helped the Oxford skyline and predicted it would "one day be loved". The writer Simon Jenkins doubted Pevsner's prediction, and claimed that "vegetation" was the "best hope" for the tower – as well as the rest of the college.

== Academics ==
Around a third of Nuffield's fellows hold appointments at the University of Oxford as lecturers, readers or professors. In addition, the college fully funds around a dozen "Official Fellowships", which the college views as tenured research professorships (although most also teach on the University's graduate programme), and about a dozen three-year Postdoctoral research fellows. The college also houses a number of young scholars who hold distinguished awards, such as British Academy post-doctoral fellowships, some senior research fellows and a group of research-active emeritus and honorary fellows. The college also produces works in the Nuffield Election Studies series. The college is also home to the Centre for Social Investigation, an interdisciplinary research group examining inequalities and social progress in Britain.

The college was the birthplace of the "Oxford School" of Industrial Relations; it pioneered the development of cost-benefit analysis for developing countries; and it has made a major contribution to the methodology of econometrics.

== Student life ==
All Nuffield students are members of the College Junior Common Room. Annual traditions include the Nuffield ball and Christmas Pantomime. All members of the College enjoy free lunches throughout the year. Nuffield fields men's and women's cricket and football teams, and members row for Linacre Boat Club.

== People associated with Nuffield ==
=== Notable students and fellows ===
Many prominent people have studied at Nuffield, including Mark Carney, Prime Minister of Canada and former Governor of the Bank of England; Manmohan Singh, former Prime Minister of India; Geoff Gallop, former Premier of Western Australia; Nicholas Stern, former Chief Economist of the World Bank and President of the British Academy; and Jonathan Levin, President of Stanford University.

Notable fellows have included psephologist David Butler, political philosopher Michael Oakeshott, political theorist and economist G. D. H. Cole, researcher of inequality Tony Atkinson, and statistician David Cox, who served as Warden between 1988 and 1994. Among the college's fellows and former fellows are four Nobel Prize laureates, Philippe Aghion, John Hicks, James Mirrlees, and Amartya Sen.

Visiting fellows include Stephanie Flanders, former BBC economics editor; Tim Harford, author and economist; and George Soros, investor and philanthropist.

In 2008, a third of all economists who were fellows of the British Academy had connections to Nuffield, as did a quarter of all political science, sociology and social statistics fellows.

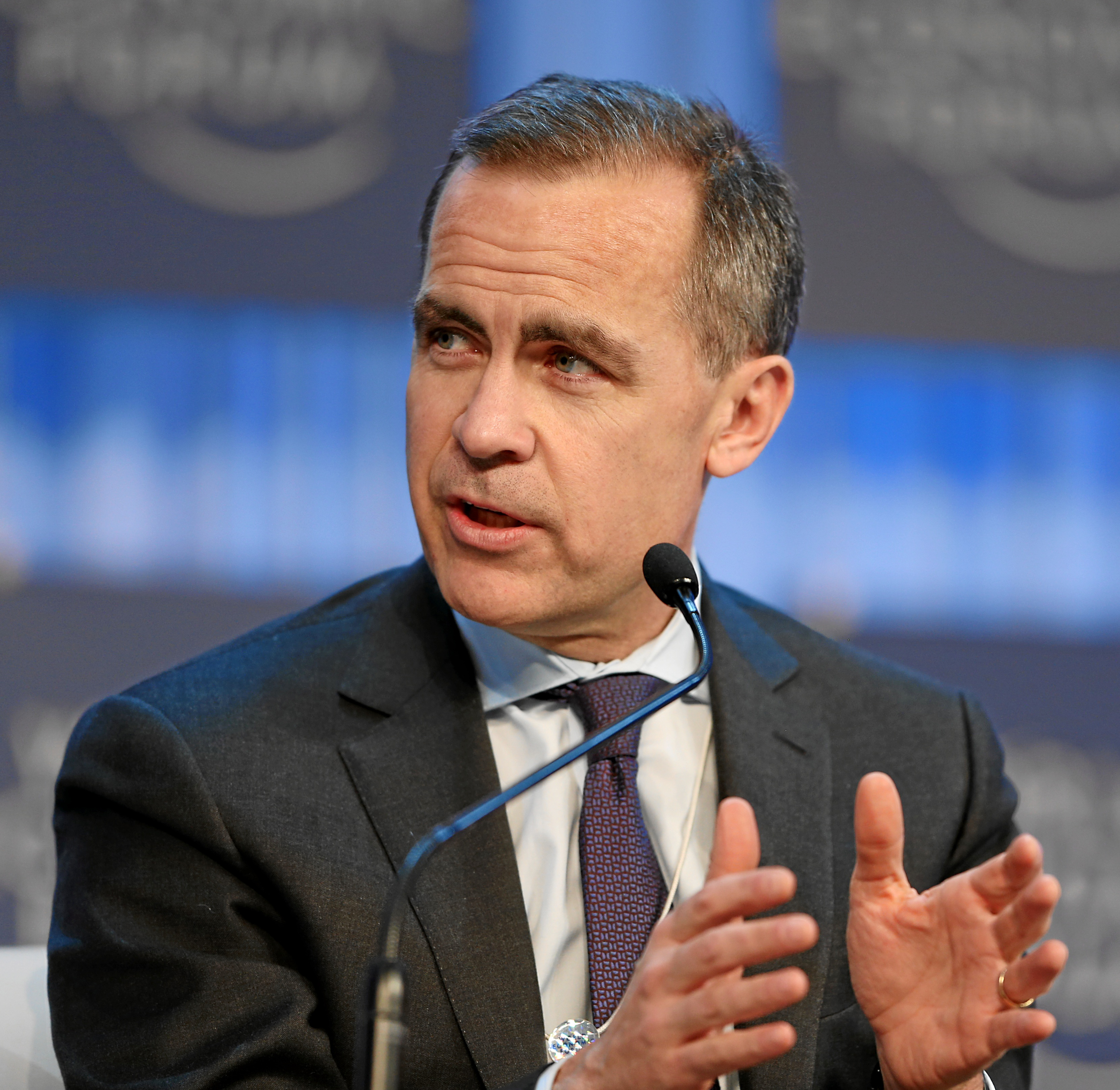
Mark Carney, Prime Minister of Canada and former Governor of the Bank of England

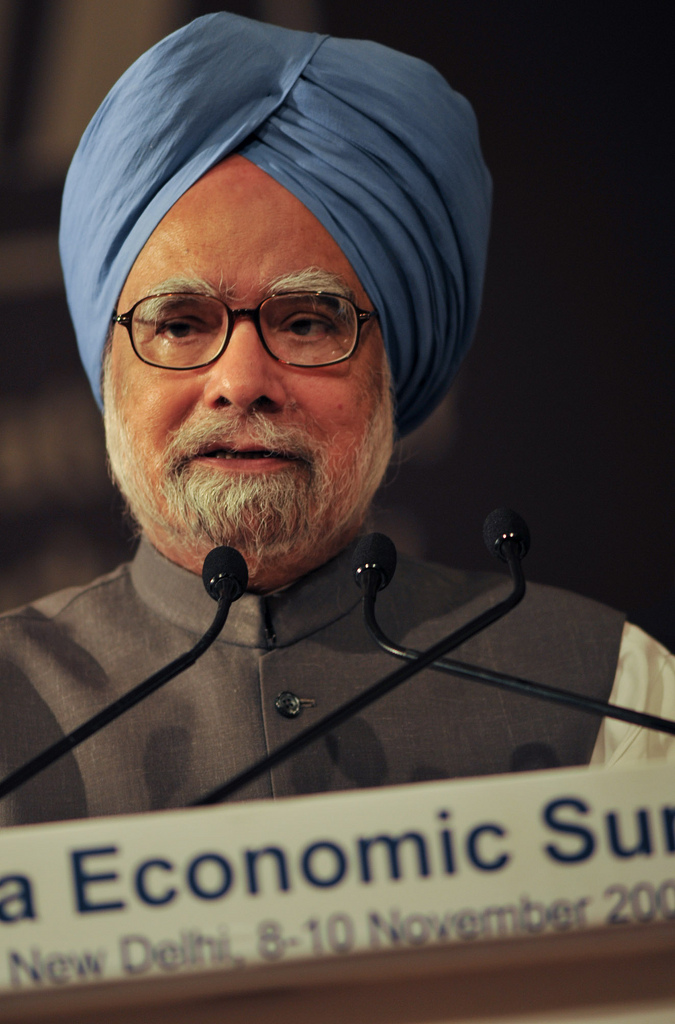
Manmohan Singh, former Prime Minister of India

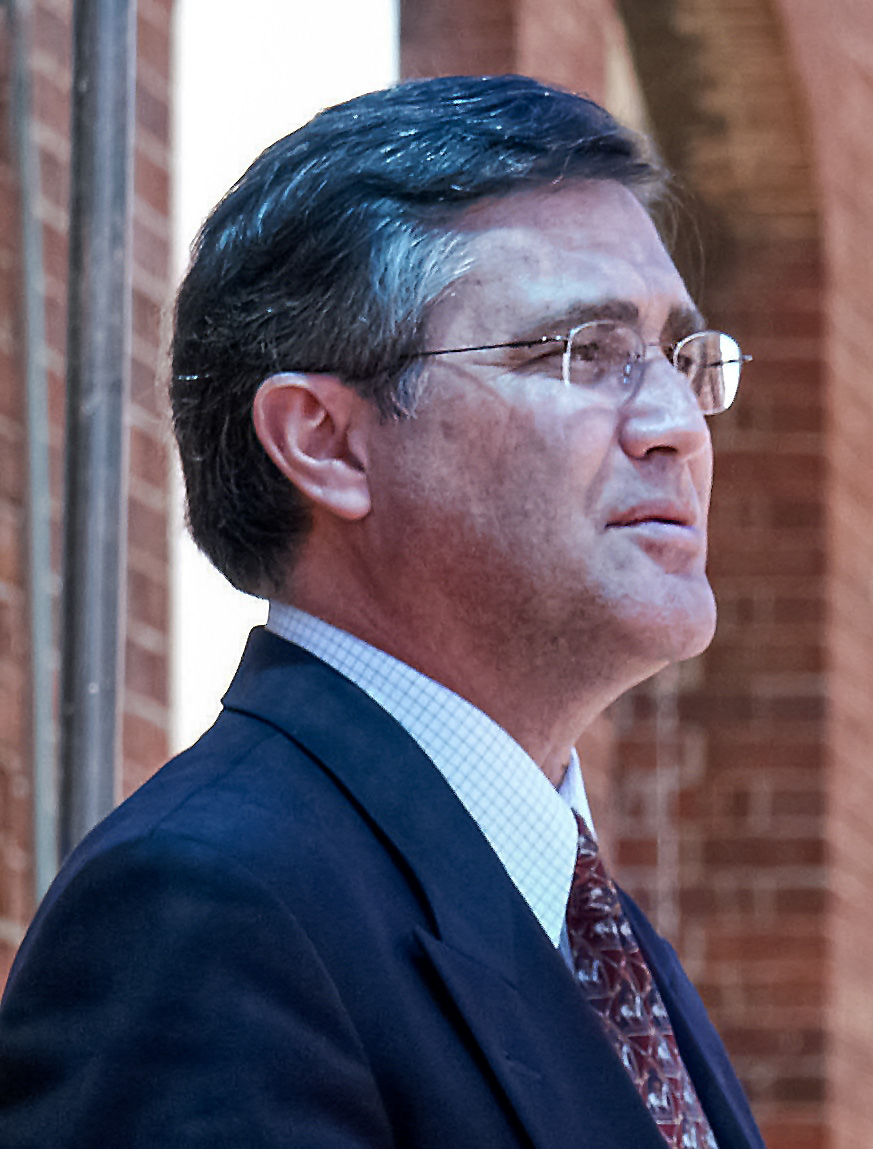
Geoff Gallop, former Premier of Western Australia

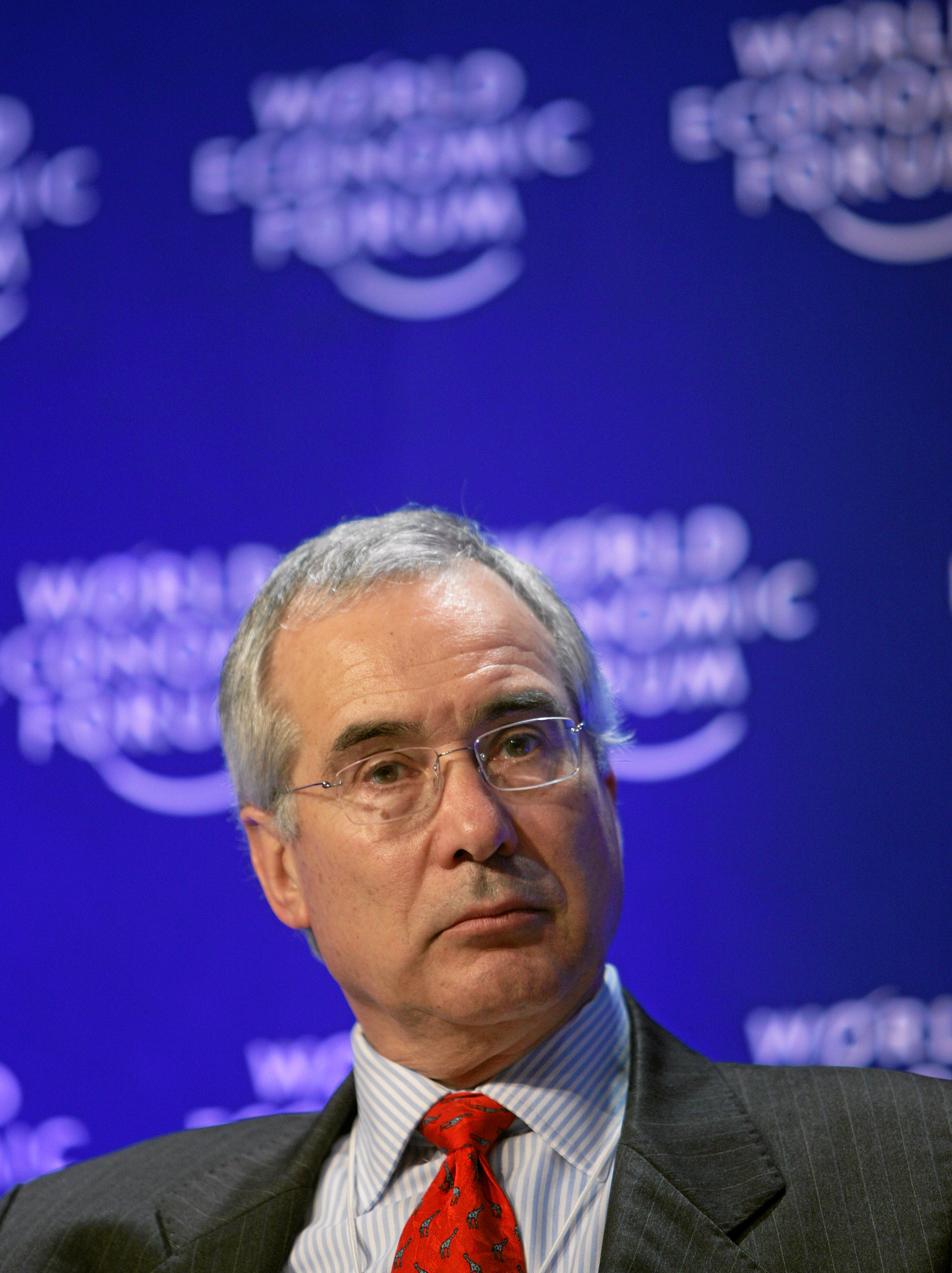
Nicholas Stern, economist and academic

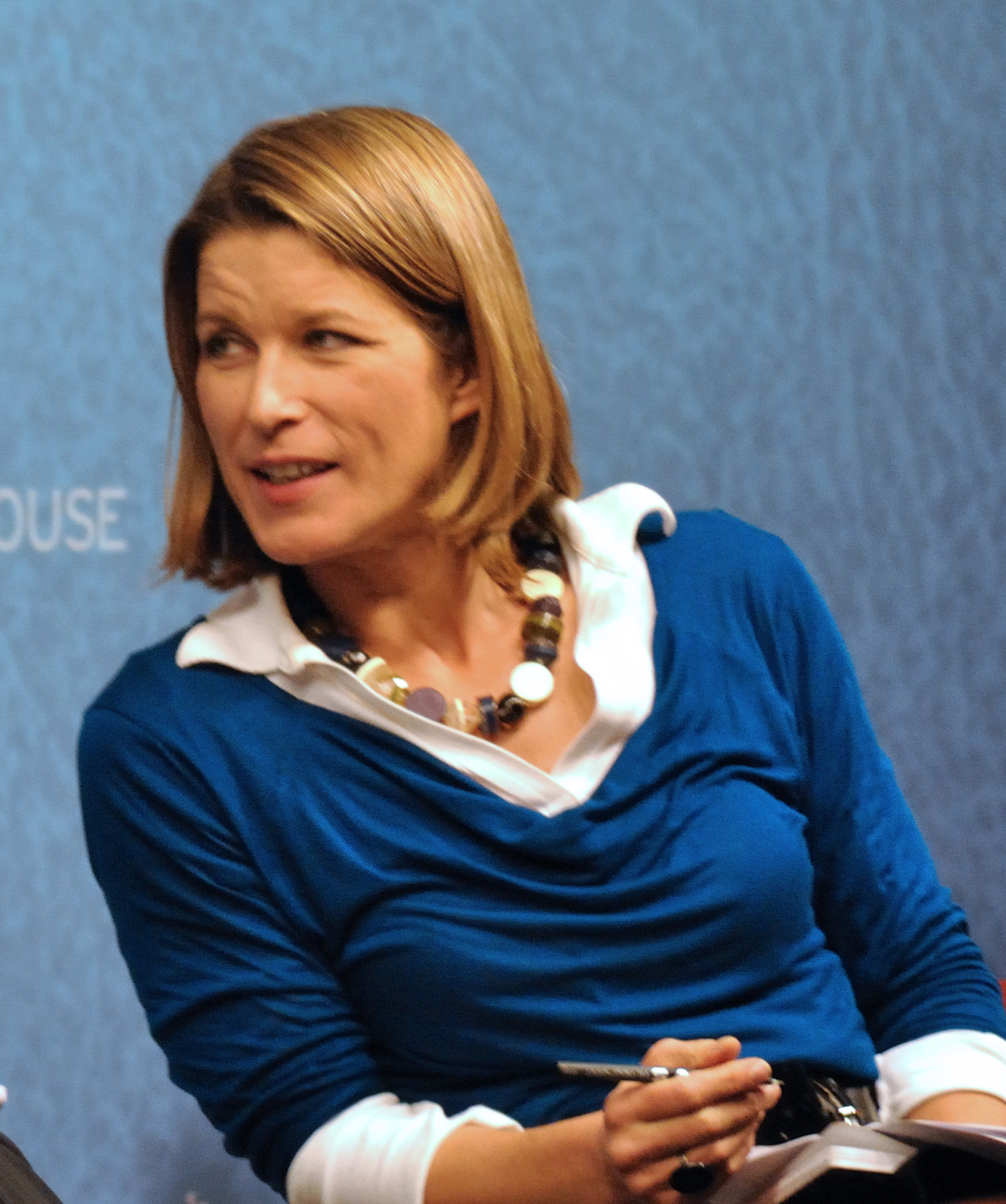
Stephanie Flanders, journalist

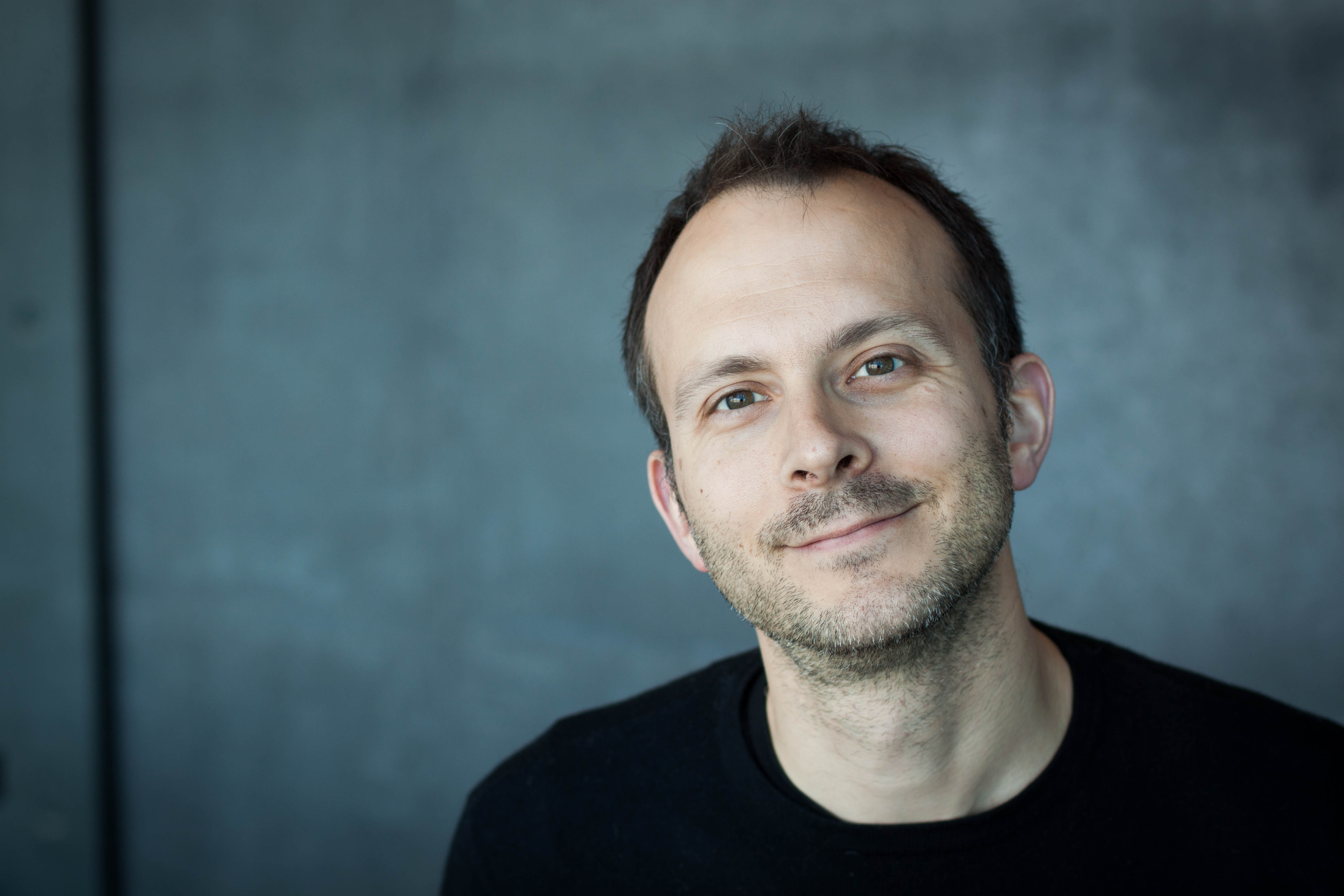
Tim Harford, economist and journalist

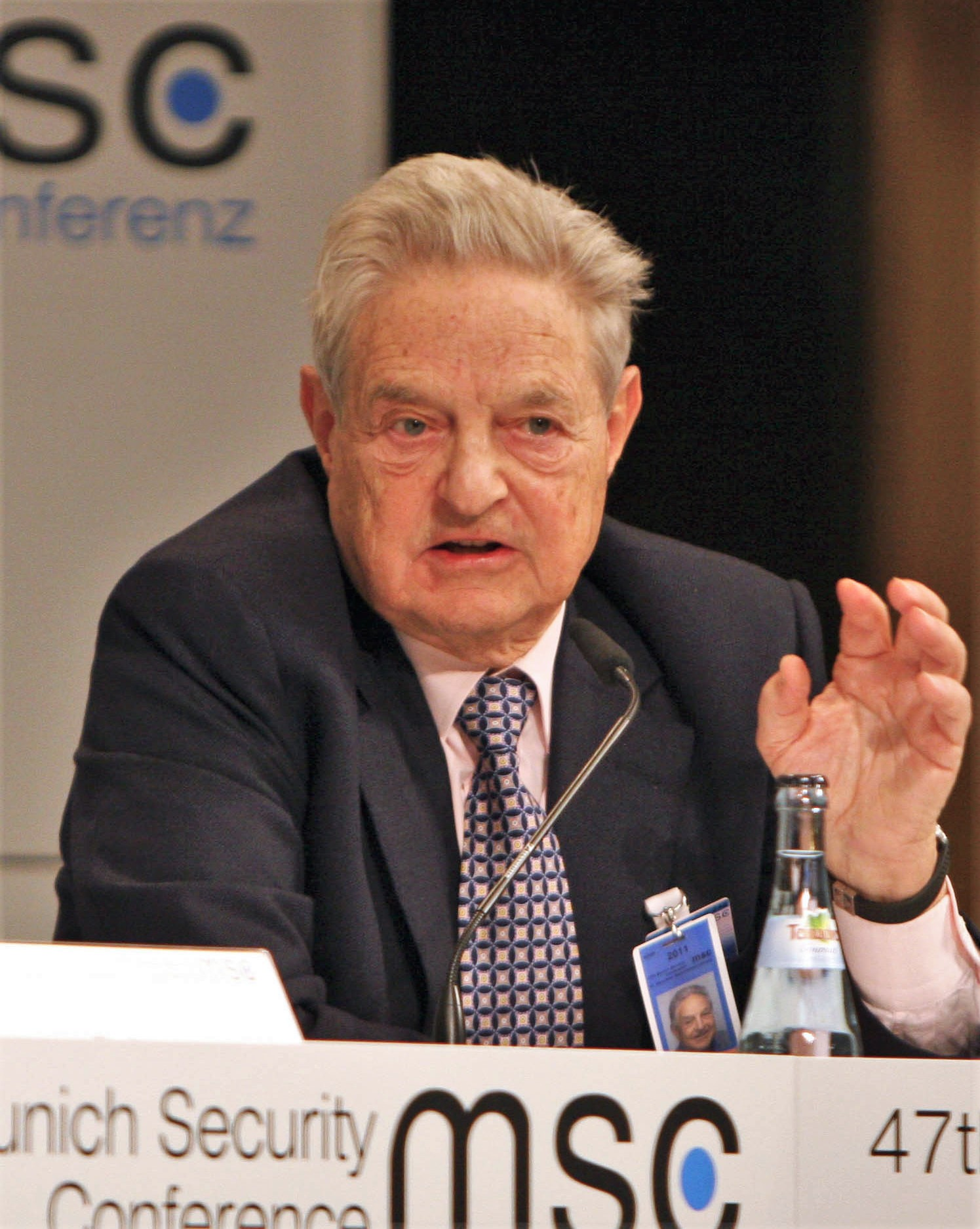
George Soros, business magnate

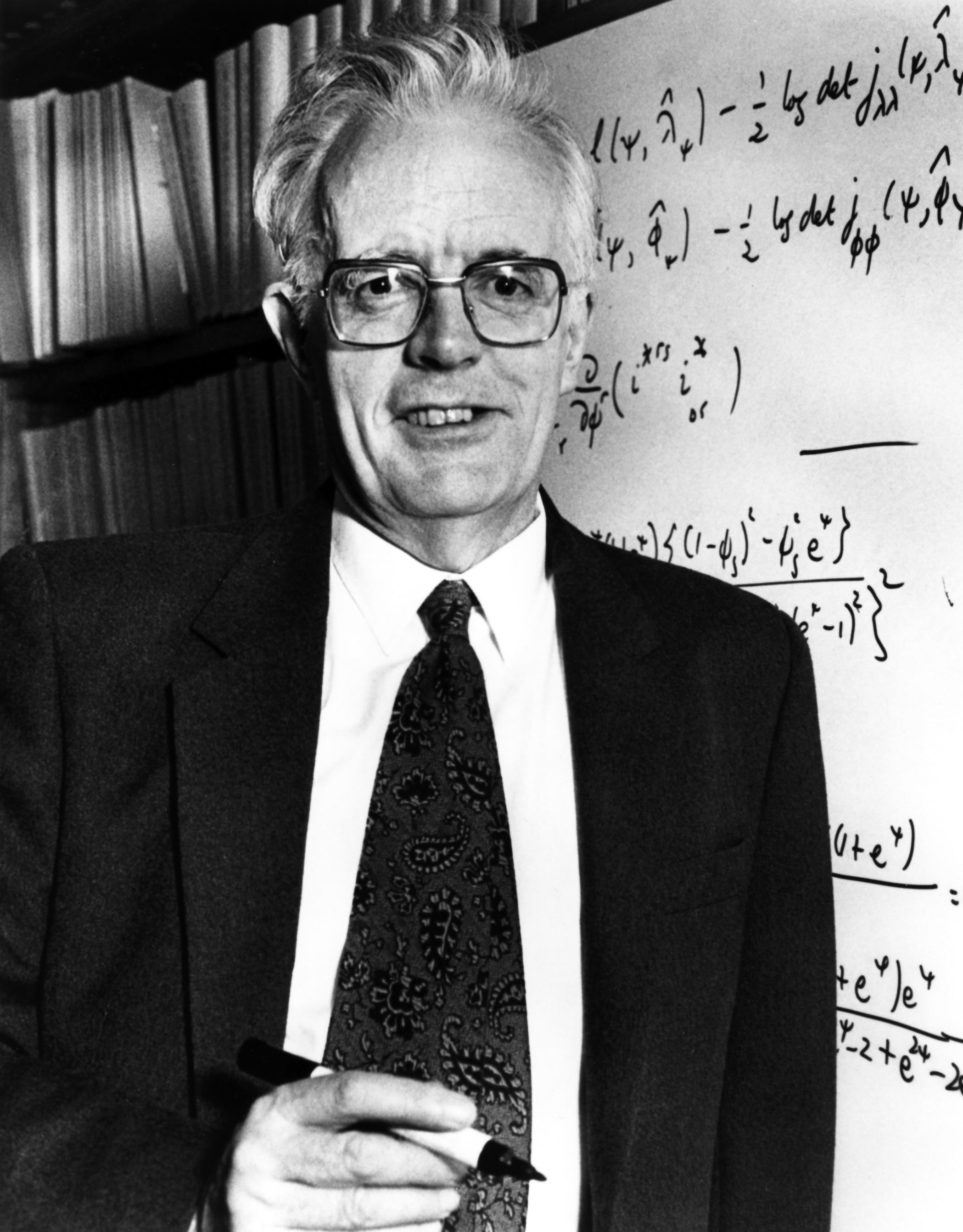
Sir David Cox, statistician

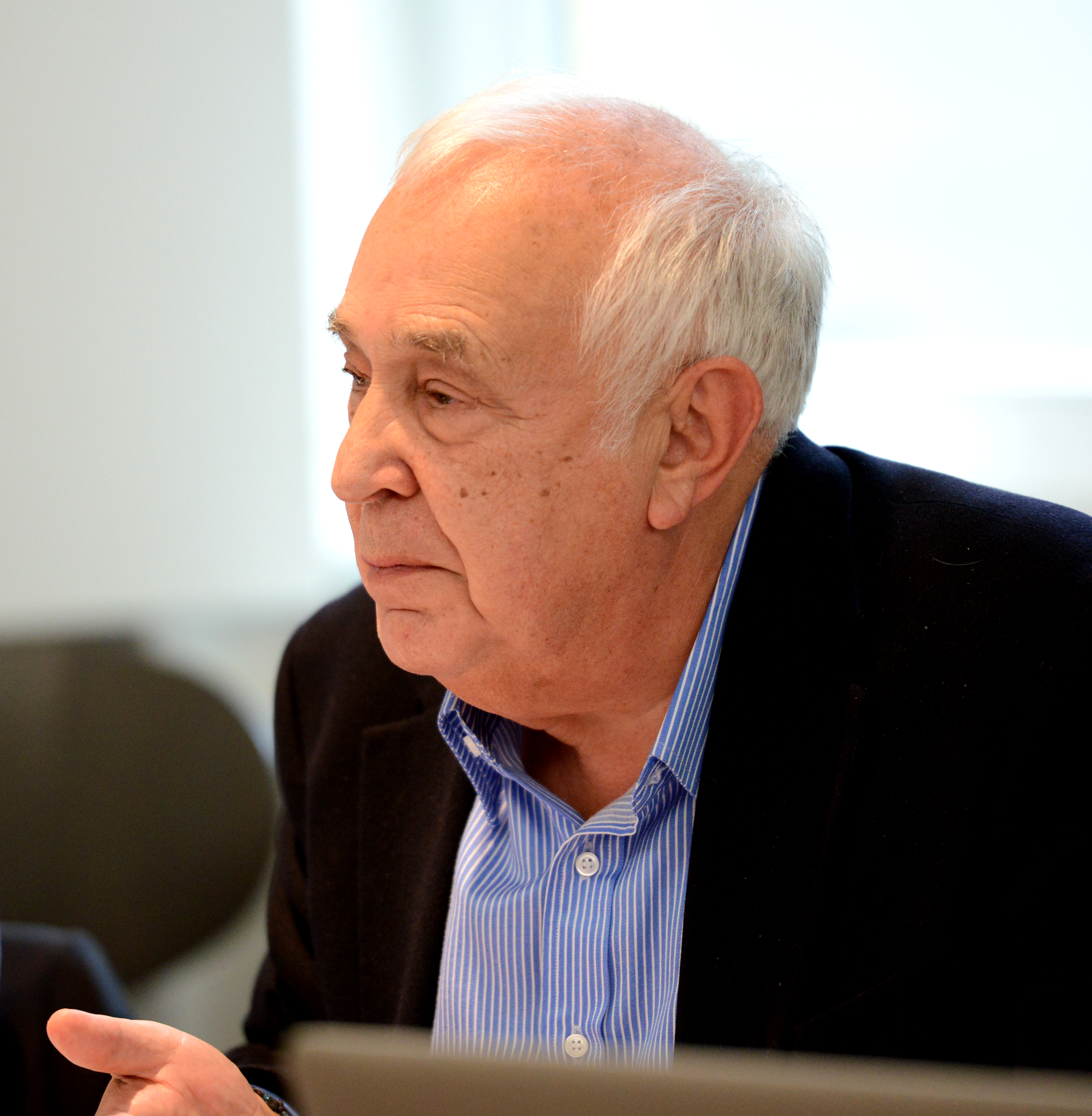
Lord Skidelsky, economic historian

=== Wardens ===
- Sir Harold Butler, 1938–1945
- Sir Henry Clay, 1945–1949
- Alexander Loveday, 1949–1954
- Sir Norman Chester, 1954–1978
- Michael Brock, 1978–1988
- Sir David Cox, 1988–1994
- Sir Anthony Atkinson, 1994–2006
- Sir Stephen Nickell, 2006–2012
- Sir Andrew Dilnot, 2012–2024
- Dame Julia Black, 2024–present

=== Visitors ===
The Visitor of Nuffield College is ex officio the Master of the Rolls.

== Gallery ==
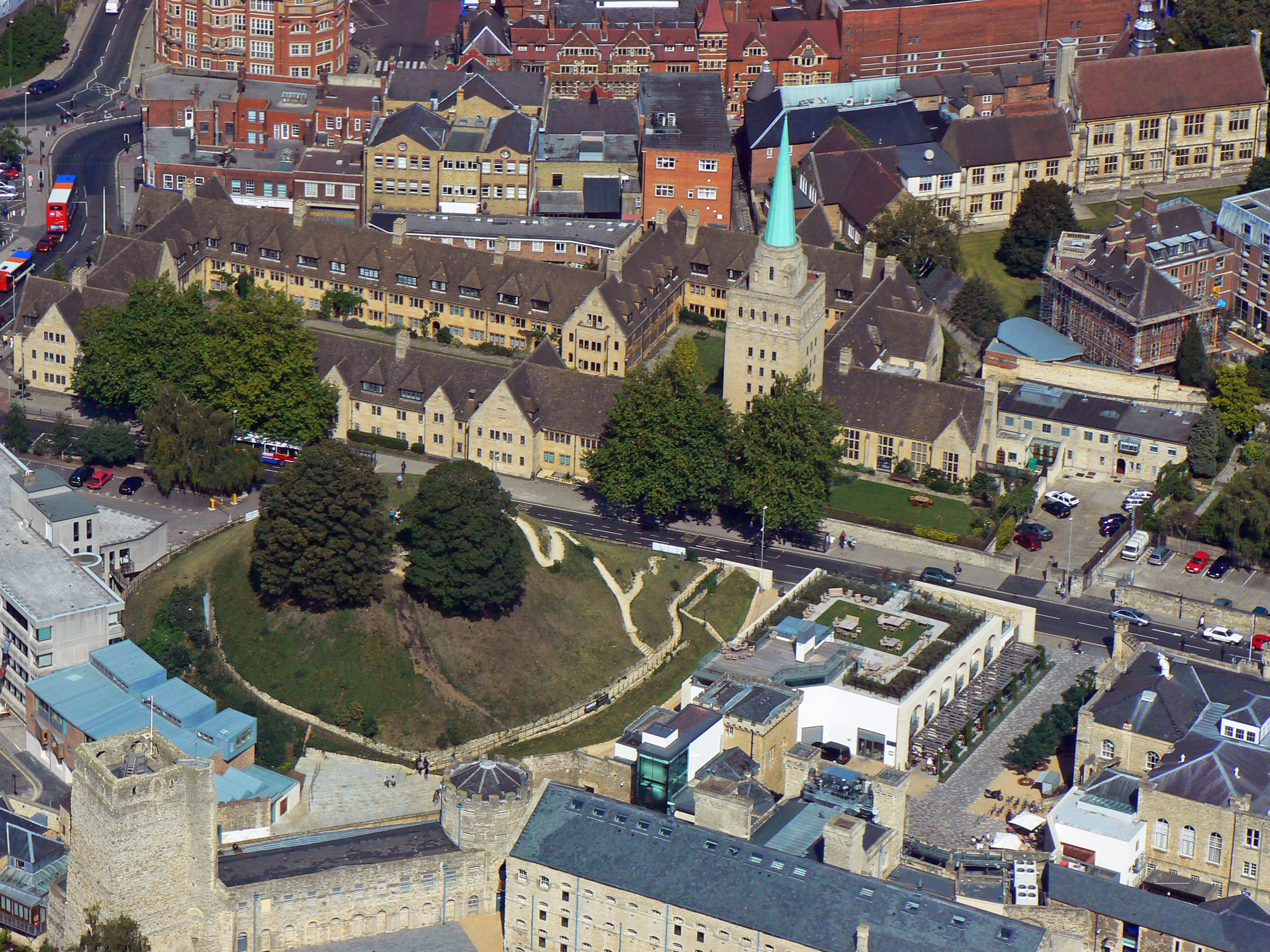
Aerial view showing Nuffield College and Castle Mound at centre left

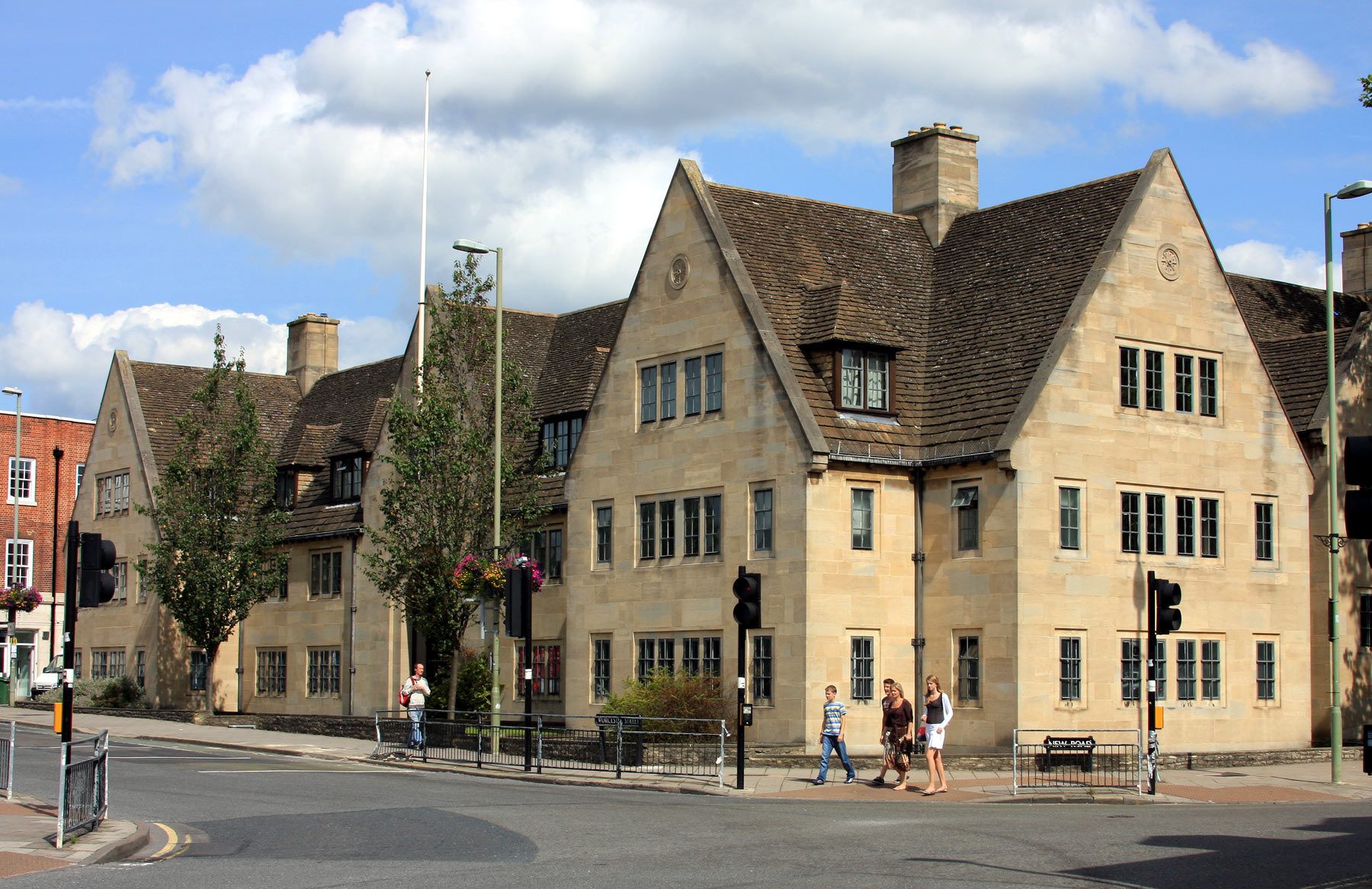
College buildings at the corner of New Road and Worcester Street

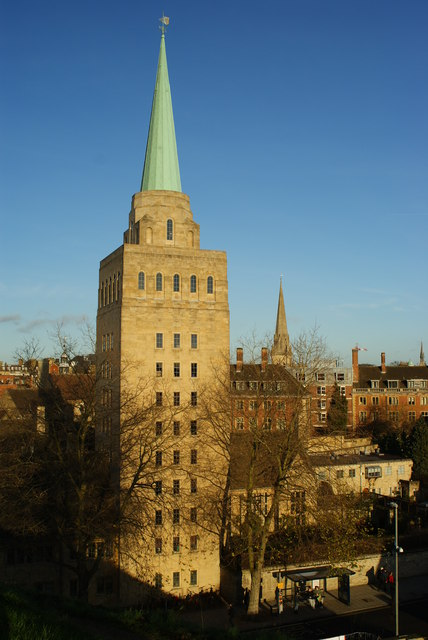
Nuffield College from the top of Castle Mound

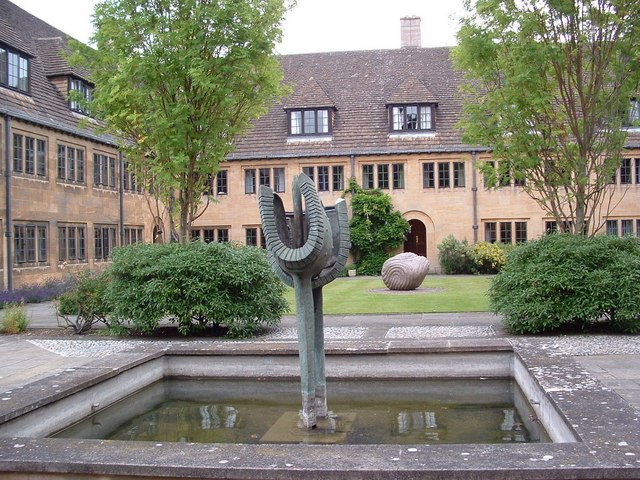
Sculptures and a pond in the Quad

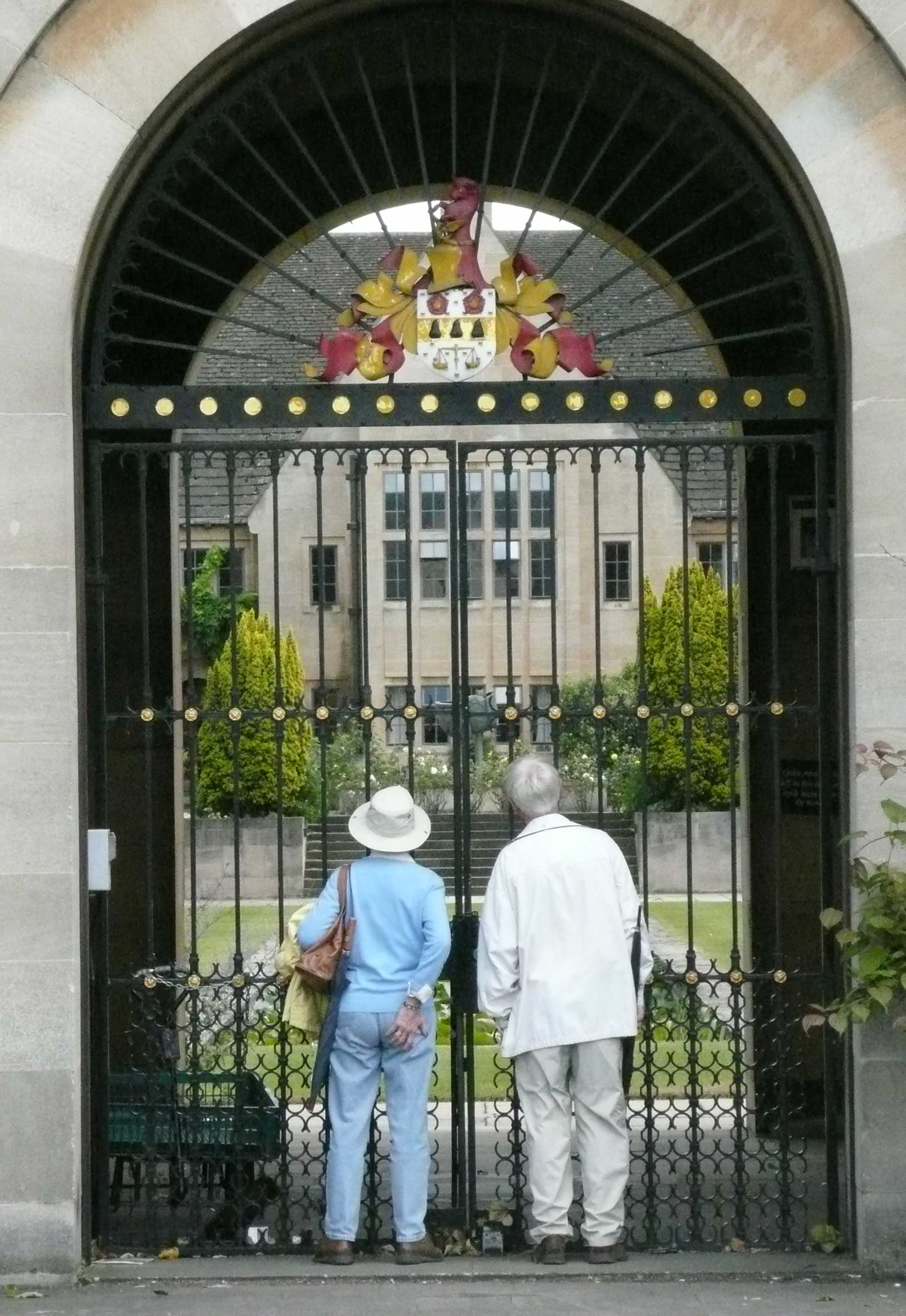
The west gate
