= Oxford Combined Court Centre =

Judicial building in Oxford, England

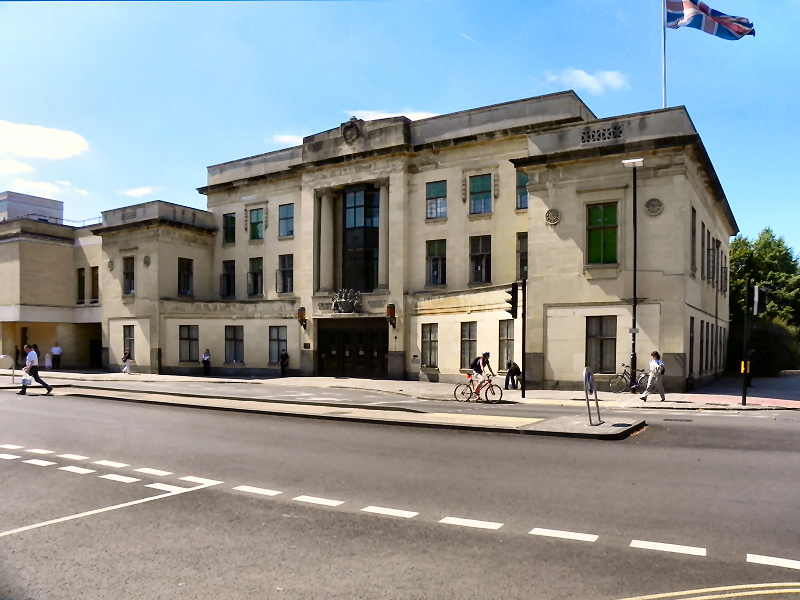
- Oxford Combined Court Centre

- Shown in Oxfordshire
- 51.7481°N 1.2570°W
- Location: St Aldate's, Oxford

History
- Built: 1932

Site notes
- Architect: Henry Smith
- Architectural style: Neoclassical style

The Oxford Combined Court Centre is a Crown Court venue, which deals with criminal cases, as well as a County Court venue, which deals with civil cases, in St Aldate's, Oxford, England.

== History ==
The building was commissioned by the then Sir William Morris (later created Viscount Nuffield) as a showroom for his motor vehicle manufacturing company, Morris Motors, which had been established in 1912. Morris initially displayed his new vehicles in an existing property at 36–37 Queen Street, but, in the early 1930s, he decided to erect a purpose-built showroom; the site he selected on the west side of St Aldate's had been occupied by a row of terraced houses.

The new showroom was designed by Henry Smith in the neoclassical style, built in yellow ashlar stone and was completed in 1932. The design involved a symmetrical main frontage of nine bays facing onto St Aldate's with the end pays projected forward as pavilions. The central bay featured, on the ground floor, an opening with three doorways and, spanning the first and second floors, a tall aedicula, formed by two vertically-stacked oriel windows flanked by Ionic order columns and piers supporting an entablature. The wings, which featured a curved section which swept round to meet the end bays at ground floor level, were fenestrated by sash windows on the first and second floors. The end bays, which were only two storeys high, were fenestrated in a similar style. Internally, the principal room was a large display area.

After British Leyland decided to focus on the Austin brand, the showroom was closed and the building was acquired by the Lord Chancellor's Department, which converted it into a courthouse at a cost of £5.2 million, to a design by the Property Services Agency. The crown court and the county court, which had previously been accommodated in the Town Hall and the old County Hall, moved into the former showroom after it had been officially re-opened by the Lord Chancellor, Lord Hailsham, on 4 October 1985. Internally, the building was laid out to accommodate nine courtrooms.

Notable cases have included the trial and conviction, in December 1995, of Gordon Wardell for the murder of his wife, Carol Wardell. They have also included the second trial, in May 1996, of Sara Thornton, and her acquittal for murder but conviction for manslaughter, in connection with the death of her violent and alcoholic husband: she was released from custody as a result of time already served. They was also the trial and conviction, in April 2006, of the nurse, Benjamin Geen, for the murder of two patients and acts of grievous bodily harm against 15 others.
