= John Plowman =

English architect (c.1773–1843)

- Occupation: Architect
- Buildings: Oxford County Hall

John Plowman (c.1773–1843) was an English architect based in Oxford. His younger son John Plowman (1807–1871) also worked on buildings on Oxford, leading to issues with attribution.

From 1812 until 1837 Plowman worked in partnership with the builder, civil engineer and architect Daniel Harris, whose foreman he had been.

John Plowman the younger was in partnership with Isaac Luck, until 1850; Luck emigrated to Christchurch in New Zealand in 1851.

== Work ==
- Saint Martin's parish church, Oxford: rebuilt church (except bell tower) (demolished 1896, except bell tower)
- Saint Mary's parish church, Adderbury, Oxfordshire: font, 1831
- Saint Michael's parish church, Oxford: rebuilt north aisle and transept, 1833
- Floating chapel, Castle Mill Stream, Oxford, 1839 (sank 1868)
- County Hall, New Road, Oxford, 1839-41
- Saint Peter's parish church, Steeple Aston, Oxfordshire: restoration, 1842
- Saint John the Baptist parish church, Bodicote, Oxfordshire: rebuilt church (with H.J. Underwood), 1844

== Sources ==
- Davies, Mark; Robinson, Catherine (2003) [2001]. A Towpath Walk in Oxford. Oxford: Oxford Towpath Press. pp. 52–54. ISBN 0-9535593-1-9.
- Sherwood, Jennifer; Pevsner, Nikolaus (1974). Oxfordshire. The Buildings of England. Harmondsworth: Penguin Books. ISBN 0-14-071045-0.
- Tyack, Geoffrey (1998). Oxford An Architectural Guide. Oxford & New York: Oxford University Press. ISBN 0-19-817423-3.
