= Murder of Carol Wardell =

1994 British murder case

Carol Wardell (née Heslop) was a 39-year-old building society manager from Meriden in the West Midlands of England. On the morning of Monday 12 September 1994 her body was discovered by a passing motorist on a grass verge on Weddington Road (the A444) in the Nuneaton and Warwickshire countryside.

Following the discovery, detectives went to Carol Wardell's home and found her husband Gordon Wardell bound and gagged and in a state of distress. Staff at The Woolwich building society in Nuneaton, where Carol Wardell was branch manager, also contacted police to report that they couldn't enter the building because she had failed to turn up for work. Staff reported that the branch appeared to have been ransacked.

== Background ==
Carol Heslop was born in Coventry on 26 April 1955, the daughter of Robert and Joan Heslop. She met her husband Gordon Wardell in 1979, they were both members of the same bowling league. They married in 1982 at Holy Trinity Church in Coventry. Shortly after her marriage, Carol started a job working at The Woolwich building society as a cashier. In 1992 Carol received a promotion to branch manager of The Woolwich branch in Nuneaton. Gordon and Carol lived in Meriden.

== Initial Response ==
On the morning of 12 September, following reports that the Nuneaton branch of The Woolwich had been ransacked, armed police and a police helicopter were sent to the building society. Armed police entered the building society premises to carry out a search. When the building was found to be empty, forensic officers entered the building to search for forensic evidence. Police later confirmed that £15,000 and building society cheque books had been stolen from the building society strong room.

A passing motorist had spotted Carol Wardell's body on a grass verge at the side of the road. Police cordoned off the scene and began searching for clues in the long grass of the verge. Police at the scene said that the body appeared to have been dumped from a vehicle. Police later confirmed that Carol had been strangled.

At the Wardell's home in Meriden, officers cordoned off the area immediately surrounding the house. Gordon Wardell was taken to Coventry and Warwickshire hospital where he was treated and questioned by police.

== Kidnapping ==
Gordon Wardell told police that he had returned home on Sunday night to find a man wearing a clown's mask, holding his wife at knife-point on the living room sofa. Gordon was punched to the ground and drugged. He did not see his wife again.

== Press conference ==
The investigation was headed by Detective Superintendent Tony Bayliss of the Warwickshire Police Force. One of the first actions taken was to hold a police press conference to appeal for information and witnesses.

Carol's husband Gordon Wardell appeared at the press conference in a wheelchair, wearing sunglasses and visibly shaken. He described how he had returned home to find a man wearing a clown's mask and a dark blue boiler suit threatening his wife at knife-point. He had been grabbed from both sides, forced down and lost consciousness after a cloth had been put over his face. He didn't remember anything else until he awoke later bound and gagged. During the press conference, questions were put to Gordon Wardell regarding a previous conviction he had for grievous bodily harm. He responded that he didn't see how the question was relevant and reiterated that all he wanted was for his wife's killers to be found.

== Reconstruction ==
On Sunday 2 October, police with the assistance of Gordon Wardell, carried out a reconstruction of his movements on the Sunday night before his wife was found murdered. He retraced his steps, having left his home in Meriden, he had driven to Coventry to post some letters at the main sorting office before driving to a public house located in the suburbs of Coventry where he had two drinks before returning home to find his wife held at knifepoint. Police hoped that the reconstruction, which was covered by local and national media, might jog someones memory so that they might come forward with new information.

== Police suspicion ==
Early during the investigation, police began to suspect that Gordon Wardell's story was not all that it seemed. Wardell had previously been convicted of a serious sexual assault and grievous bodily harm in the 1970s for which he had spent time in prison. This had brought him under suspicion. Members of the press had also discovered this and raised questions about it during press conferences.

During the police reconstruction of the night before the murder, Wardell visited a public house in Coventry called The Brooklands, but none of the staff nor customers remembered seeing Wardell in the pub.

The manner under which Wardell had been found tied and gagged in his home also didn't make sense to investigating officers. He had described being attacked by two men approaching him from the side, just after he had entered his house. Officers noticed that there wasn't enough room near the door for two men to stand or hide.

Wardell had been found by police in his underpants, tied and gagged on the living room floor. It didn't make sense that police found Wardell's clothes and shoes had been placed carefully to one side near where he was found.

Wardell had stated that he had been made unconscious by a drug administered via cloth that had been placed over his face. The drug had left him unconscious for several hours until police arrived the following morning. Experts had stated that there wasn't a drug that could be administered this way that would sedate Wardell for any more than a few minutes. A drug could have been injected but would have required medical knowledge and wouldn't have lasted for more than seven hours.

Police became aware that Wardell had been visiting prostitutes in the red light district of Coventry. Two of the prostitutes came forward to tell Police that they recognised Wardell from regular visits he'd made to them.

== Arrest of Gordon Wardell ==
On Thursday 20 October 1994, Gordon Wardell was arrested on suspicion of his wife's murder. He was taken to Nuneaton police station to be questioned. Wardell was questioned at the police station for four days before being charged on the evening of 23 October with the murder of Carol Wardell. He was also charged with the burglary and theft of £14,126.67 from The Woolwich Building Society.

== Trial of Gordon Wardell ==
The trial of Gordon David Wardell was held at Oxford Crown Court. The prosecution represented by Richard Wakerley QC alleged that Wardell had killed his own wife, dumped her body and then staged an "elaborate scheme" to "deceive and divert attention" away from himself.

During the trial, the jury was told how Wardell had been found lying on his living room floor in his underpants. He was gagged with a strip of cloth, his hands tied with plastic ratchet ties to a plastic refuse sack holder. Ambulance crews who attended the scene, noted that Wardell did not have a raised heart rate or high blood pressure, although appeared to have bruising to his stomach.

Wardell told the court that he had returned home from the pub at 10pm to find his wife being held at knifepoint. He was grabbed from the sides and forced to the ground. When asked if he had killed his wife, Wardell replied "Absolutely not."

The trial lasted for six weeks, during which, 128 witnesses were called. At the end of the trial the jury was sent out to consider its verdict. The jury deliberated for nine and half hours before returning a verdict of guilty.

Mr Justice Cresswell told Wardell: "You are a dangerous, evil and devious man. This murder was an outrage to your wife and to her family."

On 21 December 1995, Gordon Wardell was sentenced to life imprisonment. The Home Secretary set Wardell's minimum tariff to 18 years.

== Appeal ==
In 2007, through his solicitors, Gordon Wardell made an application under Schedule 22 or the Criminal Justice Act 2003 for his minimum term, the amount of time before which he would be eligible for parole, to be reduced.

Mr Justice Teare who considered the application ruled that the minimum tariff of 18 years set by the Home Secretary would stand, less 14 months Wardell had already spent in custody awaiting trial.

== Release ==
Gordon Wardell was released on licence in December 2021, having served 27 years. His release was not publicly announced until September 2023, when the Daily Mail reported that he had been paroled 21 months earlier.

== Tributes and memorial to Carol Wardell ==
Carol Wardell was described by John Stewart, CEO of The Woolwich as "very well respected and highly regarded" having worked for the company for 12 years. He also described her as "the perfect employee".

In the days after the murder, local people left floral tributes at the front of the Woolwich branch in Nuneaton.

Carol Wardell's funeral was held on 13 October 1994, attended by more than 100 of her friends and relatives.

Following the conviction of Gordon Wardell, Carol's mother, Joan Heslop said, "Carol will be able to rest now in peace. She loved life and was full of life. To have it taken away in such a way was terrible."
