= New Road, Oxford =

Street in west central Oxford, England

New Road
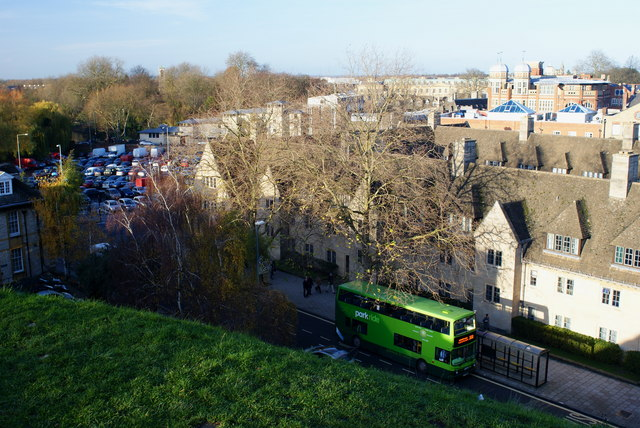
- View of New Road from the Oxford Castle mound
- Interactive map of New Road
- Length: 0.1 mi (0.16 km)
- Location: Oxford, England
- Postal code: OX1 1
- Coordinates: 51°45′08″N 1°15′44″W
- west end: 51.75279°N 1.26383°W
- east end: 51.75168°N 1.26079°W
- North: Nuffield College, Oxford
- East: Park End Street
- South: Oxford Castle
- West: Bonn Square

Construction
- Construction start: 1769
- Completed: 1770
- Inauguration: 1770

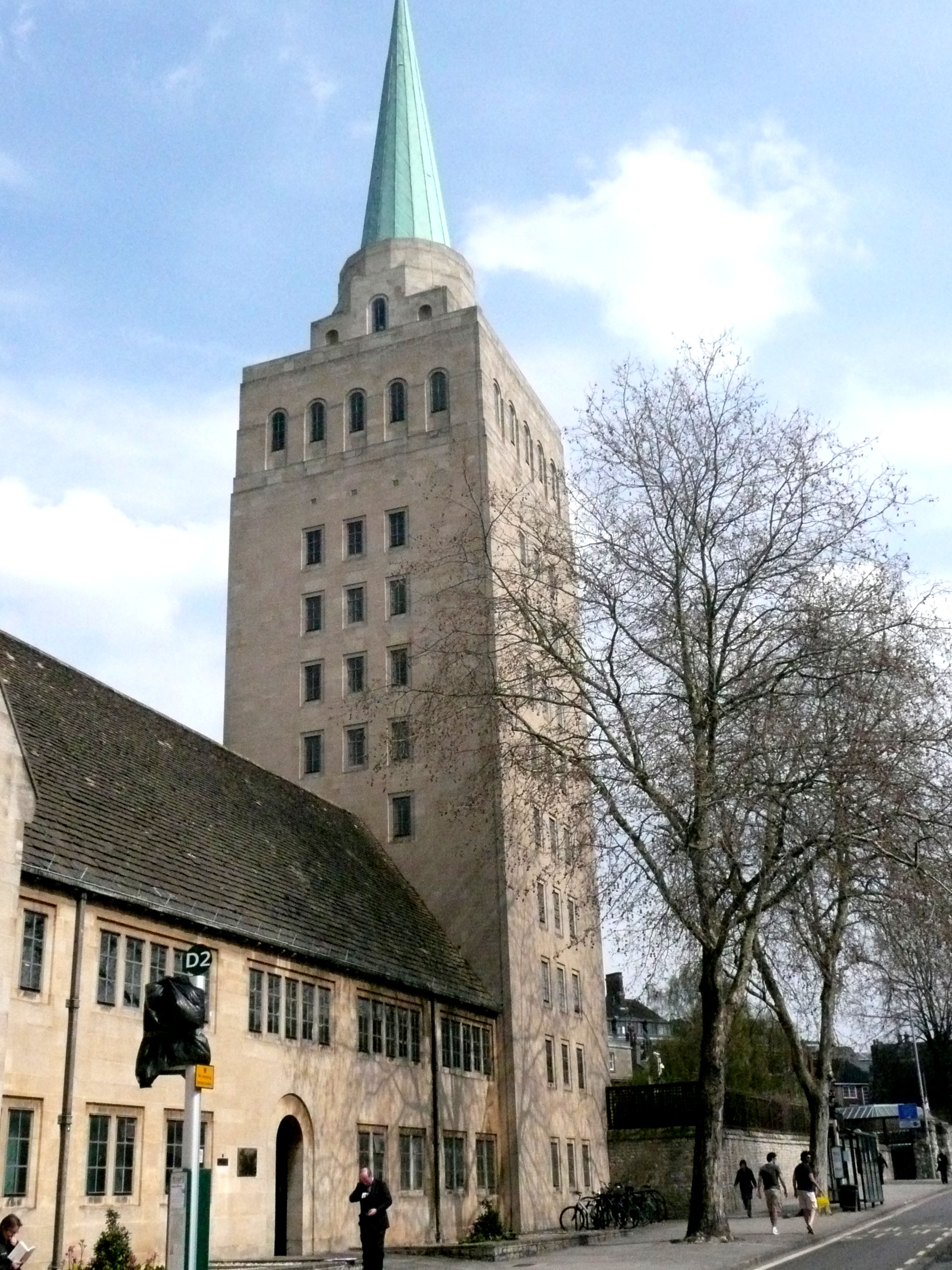
The tower of Nuffield College on New Road

New Road is a street in west central Oxford, England. It links Park End Street and Worcester Street to the west with Queen Street and Castle Street to the east. To the south is Oxford Castle and the former Oxford Prison, now a Malmaison hotel. To the north is Nuffield College, a graduate college of Oxford University. At the eastern end on the south side is New County Hall, the headquarters of Oxfordshire County Council.

== History ==
New Road was built in 1769–70 as a new turnpike road between central Oxford and the west. It bypassed the earlier and narrower Hythe Bridge Street to the north and St. Thomas's High Street (now St Thomas' Street) to the south. It was built through what remained of the northern outer ramparts and ditch of Oxford Castle, but Christ Church, Oxford preserved the 11th-century castle mount "as a venerable monument of antiquity".

From 1790, there was a coal wharf at the end of the Oxford Canal on the north side of New Road. Nuffield College was built on the site of the wharf between 1951 and 1960. The canal is now truncated on the north side of Hythe Bridge Street.

County Hall was built just east of Oxford Castle in 1840–41. The architect John Plowman designed it in a Norman Revival style with crenellations to complement the castle.

St. Peter-le-Bailey Parish School was built in 1849 on the corner of New Road and Tidmarsh Lane. Increasing traffic on New Road made this an unsatisfactory site for a school so in 1898 an appeal was launched for funds to move to new premises. This enabled the school to relocate to a site in New Inn Hall Street. In 1911–12 new offices for the County Council's Education Department were built on the former school site. The architect W.A. Daft designed the building, which is of yellow brick with yellow Bath Stone quoins and other details and topped by a cupola. It is now the Oxfordshire County Register Office.

The Oxfordshire Militia Armoury and Drill Hall was built just west of the castle in 1854. It too was designed with crenellations to complement the castle, in this case by J.C. Buckler. After 1857 the building was transferred to the newly founded Oxfordshire County Constabulary as its headquarters. In 1969 it was demolished and replaced by Macclesfield House, a building of precast concrete which until the 2000s was one of the offices of Oxfordshire County Council.

On the north side of New Road is a small Gothic Revival building designed by Charles Buckeridge and built in 1863. It was first a court house, then the Probate Registry, and is now private offices.

Early in the 1970s, Castle Street was realigned, and New County Hall was built on the corner of Castle Street and New Road. New County Hall, like Macclesfield House, was designed by the Oxfordshire County Architect.

== Gallery ==
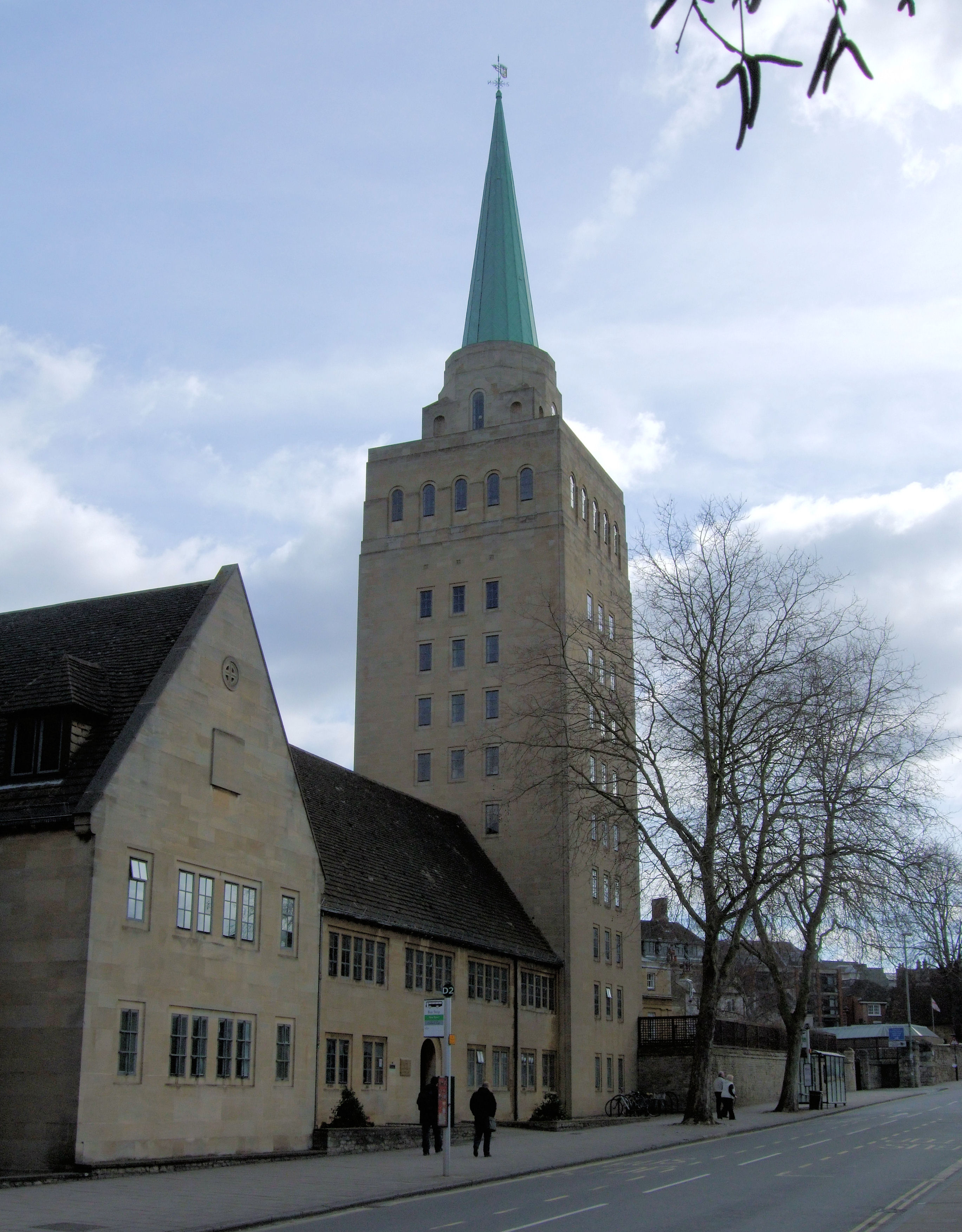
View of Nuffield College on New Road

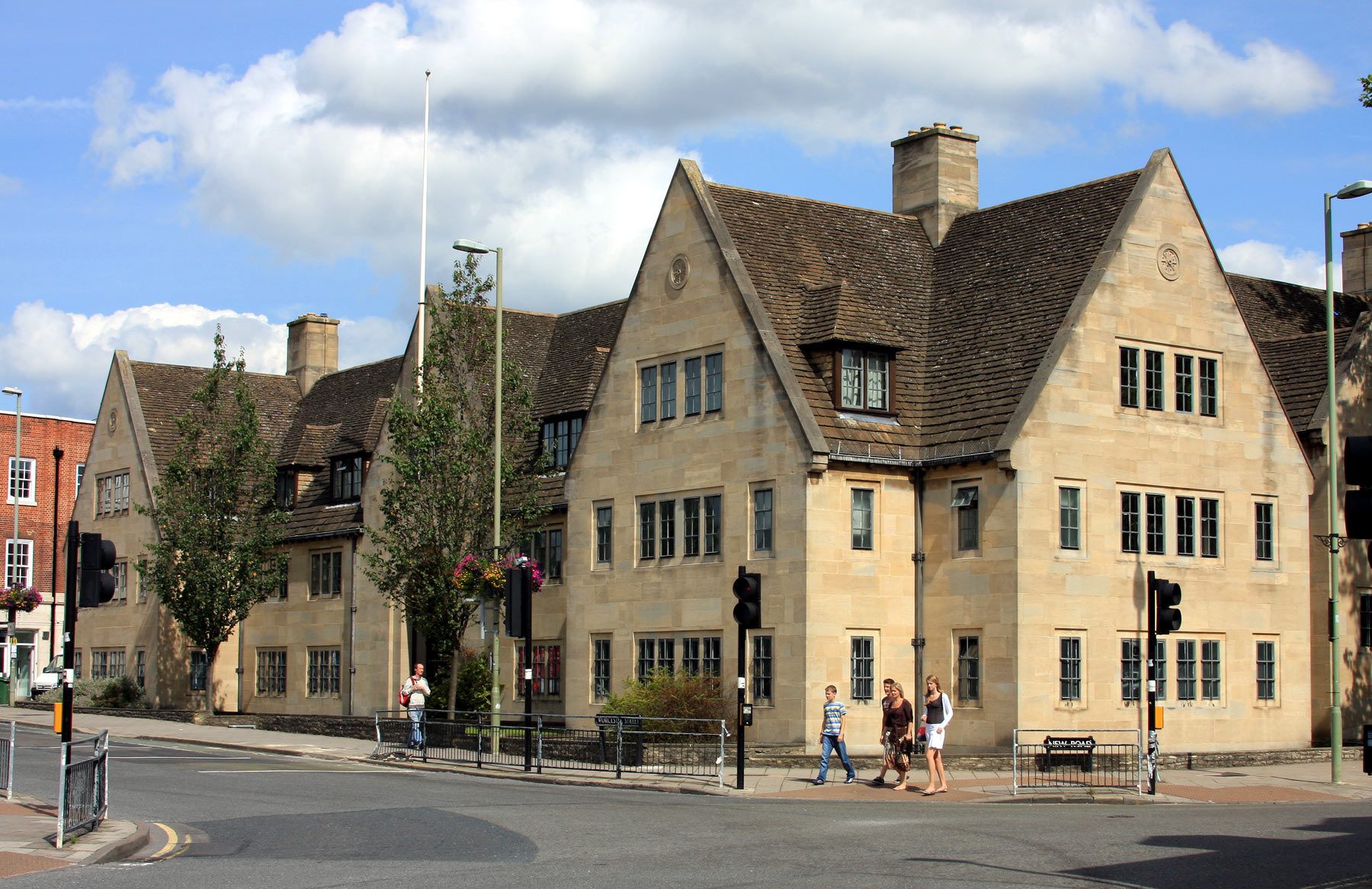
Nuffield College at the corner of New Road and Worcester Street

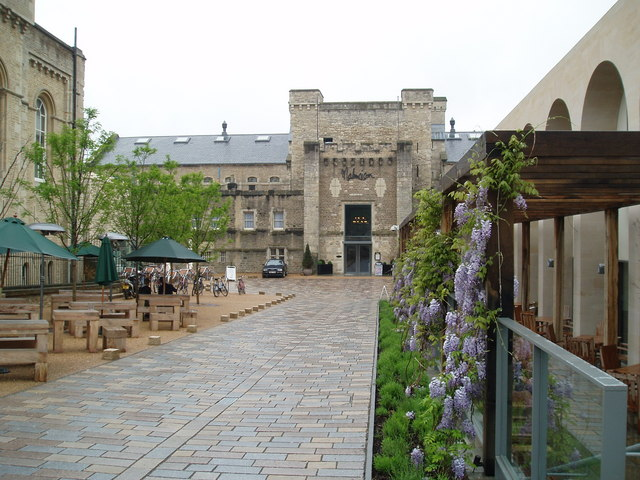
Malmaison Hotel on New Road, formerly Oxford Prison

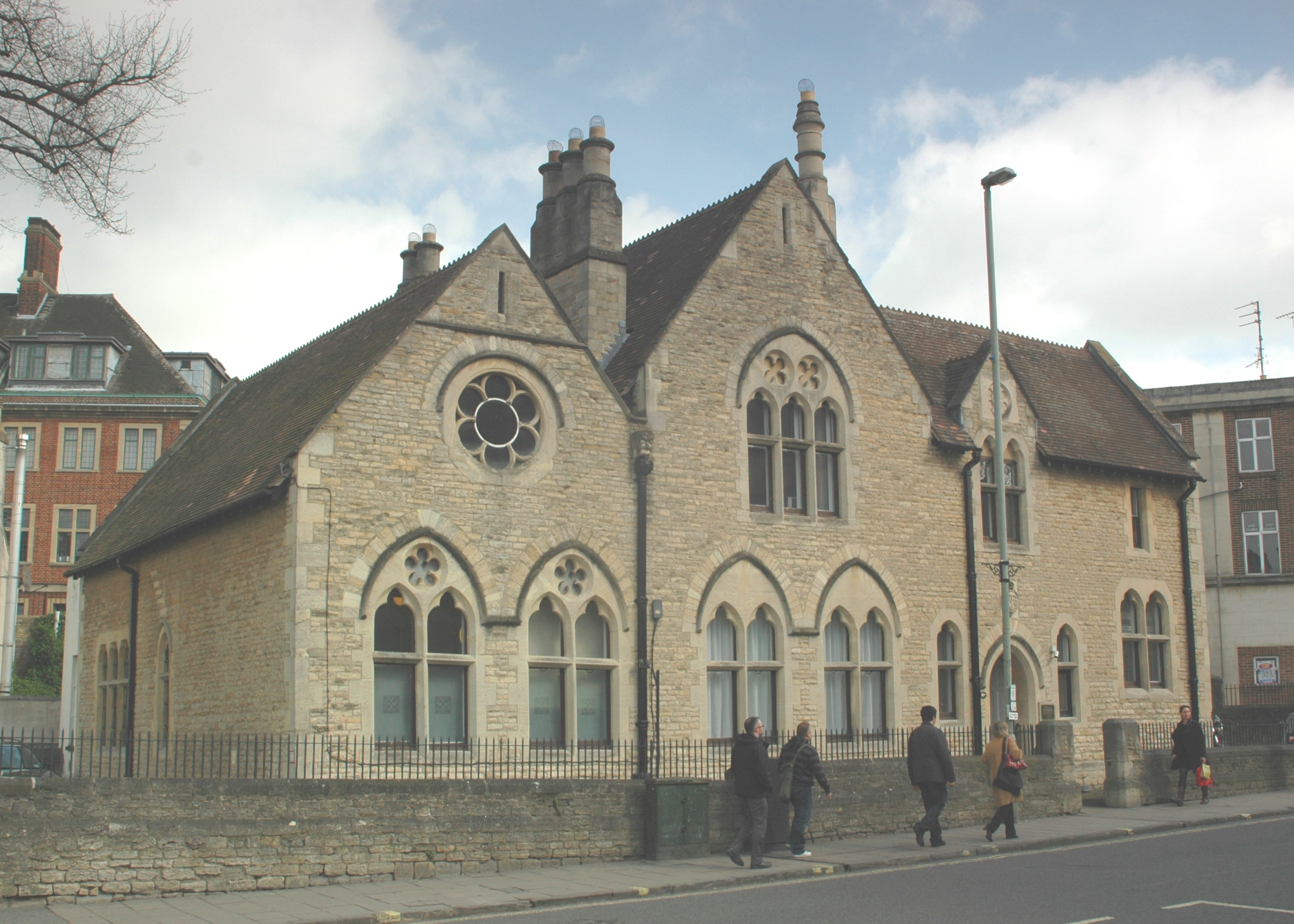
Former courthouse and probate office opposite New County Hall, designed by Charles Buckeridge in 1863

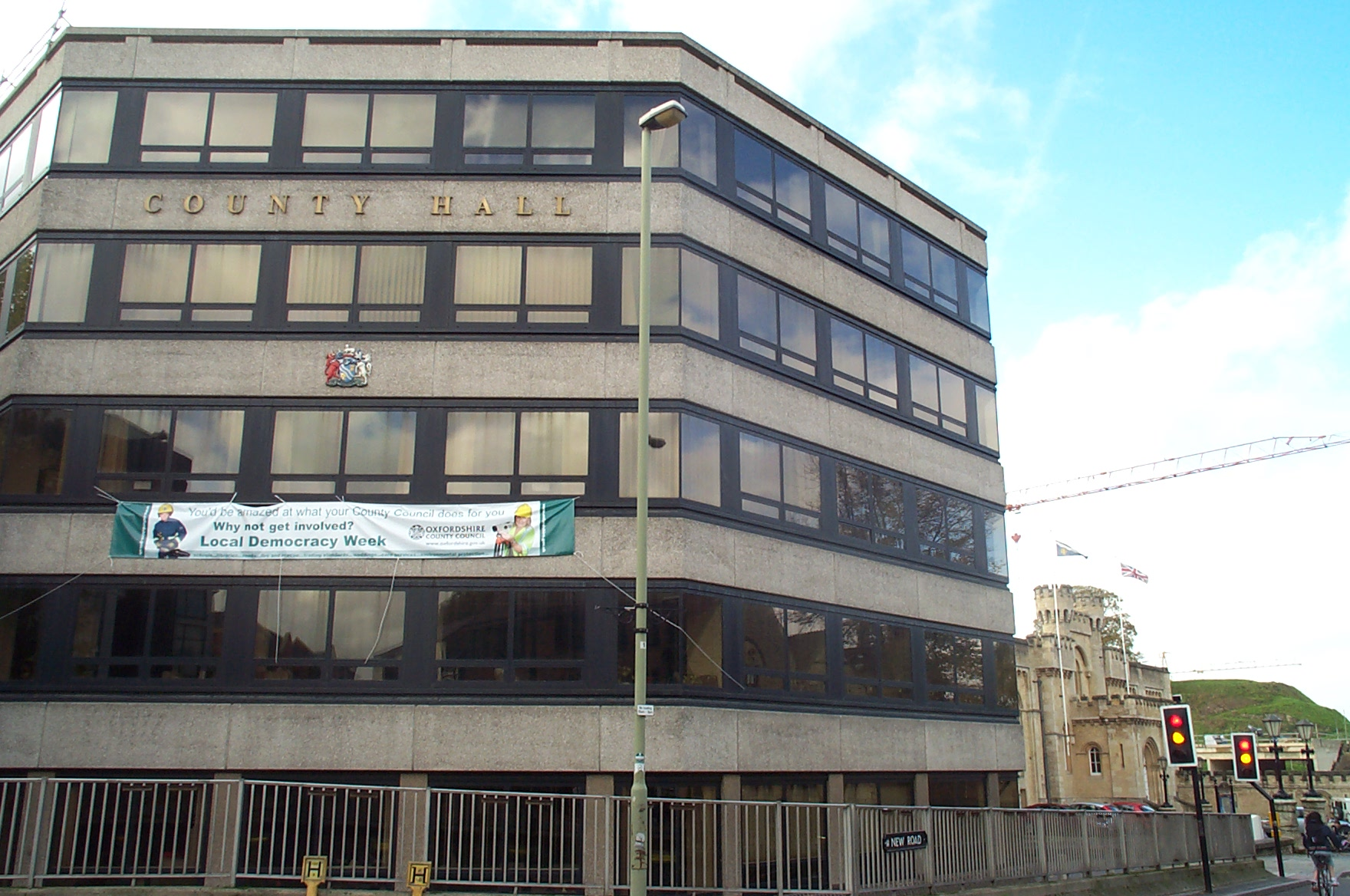
New County Hall at the eastern end of New Road

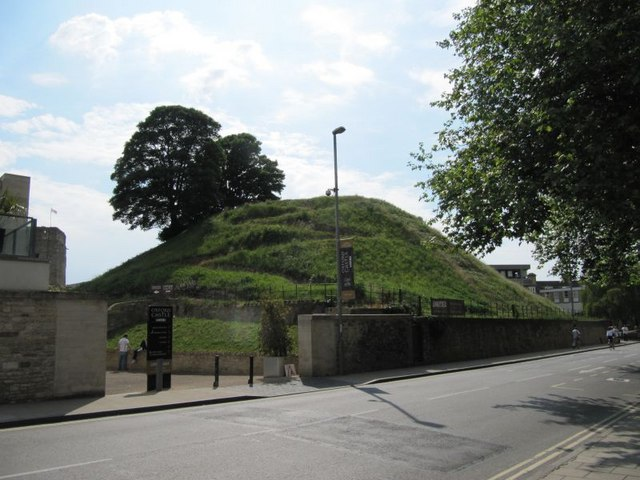
View of the Oxford Castle mound from New Road

== See also ==
- Buildings of Nuffield College, Oxford

== Sources ==
- Chance, Eleanor; Colvin, Christina; Cooper, Janet; Day, C.J.; Hassall, T.G.; Selwyn, Nesta (1979). Crossley, Alan; Elrington, C.R. (eds.). A History of the County of Oxford. Victoria County History. Vol. 4, the City of Oxford. pp. 442–462.
- Rhodes, John; Munby, Julian (2008). Castle, Canal & College: Worcester Street Car Park & related areas, Oxford. Oxford: Oxford Preservation Trust.
- Sherwood, Jennifer; Pevsner, Nikolaus (1974). Oxfordshire. The Buildings of England. Harmondsworth: Penguin Books. ISBN 0-14-071045-0.
