= County Hall, Oxford =

County building in Oxford, Oxfordshire, England

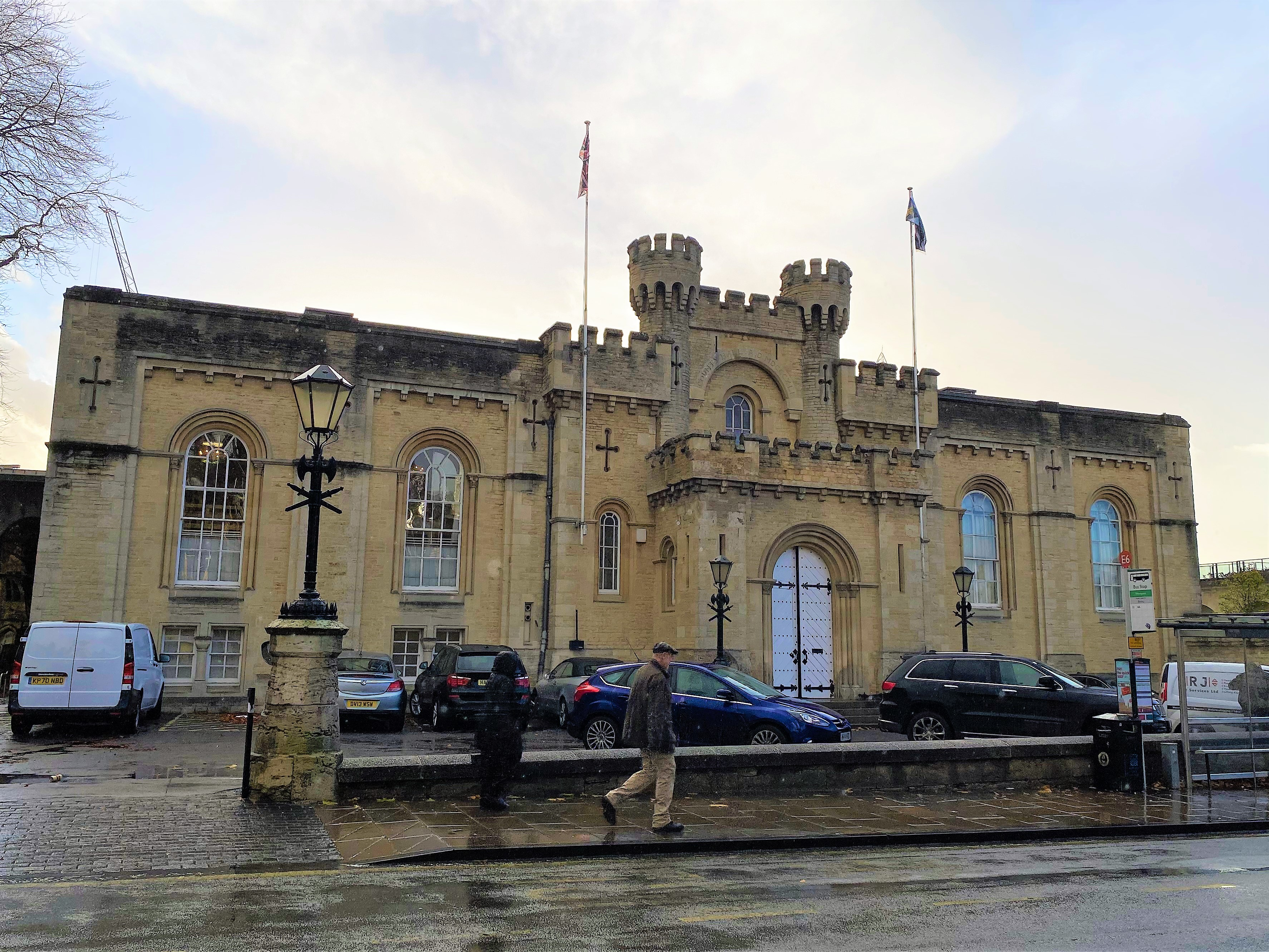
- County Hall, New Road, Oxford

- Location within Oxfordshire
- 51.7518°N 1.2618°W
- Location: Oxford, Oxfordshire

History
- Built: 1841

Site notes
- Architect: John Plowman
- Architectural style: Gothic Revival style

Listed Building – Grade II*
- Designated: 29 January 1968
- Reference no.: 1047201

County Hall is a municipal building on New Road in Oxford, Oxfordshire, England. County Hall, which is the headquarters of Oxfordshire County Council, is a Grade II* listed building.

== History ==
In the early 16th century, the assizes and quarter sessions were held in a sessions house in the grounds of Oxford Castle but towards the end of the century they were moved to Oxford Town Hall. After deciding in the early 19th century that this arrangement was inadequate for their needs, the justices decided to procure a dedicated building within, what was then, the castle grounds.

The building, which was designed by John Plowman in the Gothic Revival style, was completed in 1841. The design involved a symmetrical castellated main frontage of five bays facing New Road: the central section featured a projecting castellated porch containing a round headed doorway with a small round headed window above encircled with the inscription "County Hall A.D. MDCCCXLI" ("County Hall A.D. 1841"); there were turrets at roof level and the other bays contained round headed windows. Sir Charles Oman described it as "quite the most abominable pseudo-Gothic Assize Court in all England".

The building continued to be used as a facility for dispensing justice but, following the implementation of the Local Government Act 1888, which established county councils in every county, it also became the meeting place of Oxfordshire County Council.

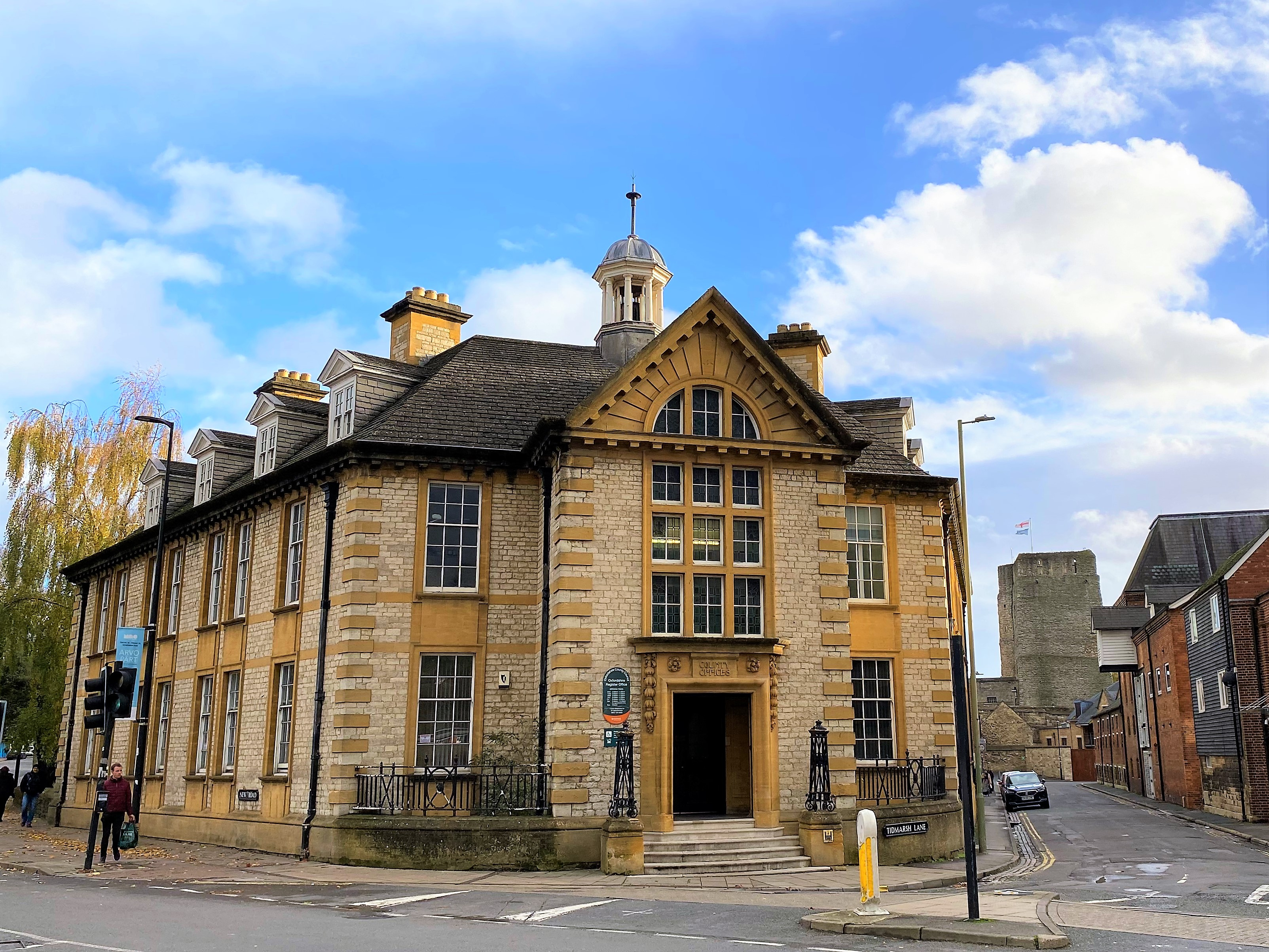
County Offices (now the Register Office), 1 Tidmarsh Lane

The limited office space at County Hall required the council to establish other premises for its staff. In 1911 and 1912, a new building called "County Offices" was built at the corner of Tidmarsh Lane and New Road, lying on the opposite side of the castle mound from County Hall. County Offices was designed by William Austin Daft and built in white limestone with yellow sandstone dressings. Council meetings continued to be held at County Hall, with County Offices being the main administrative building.

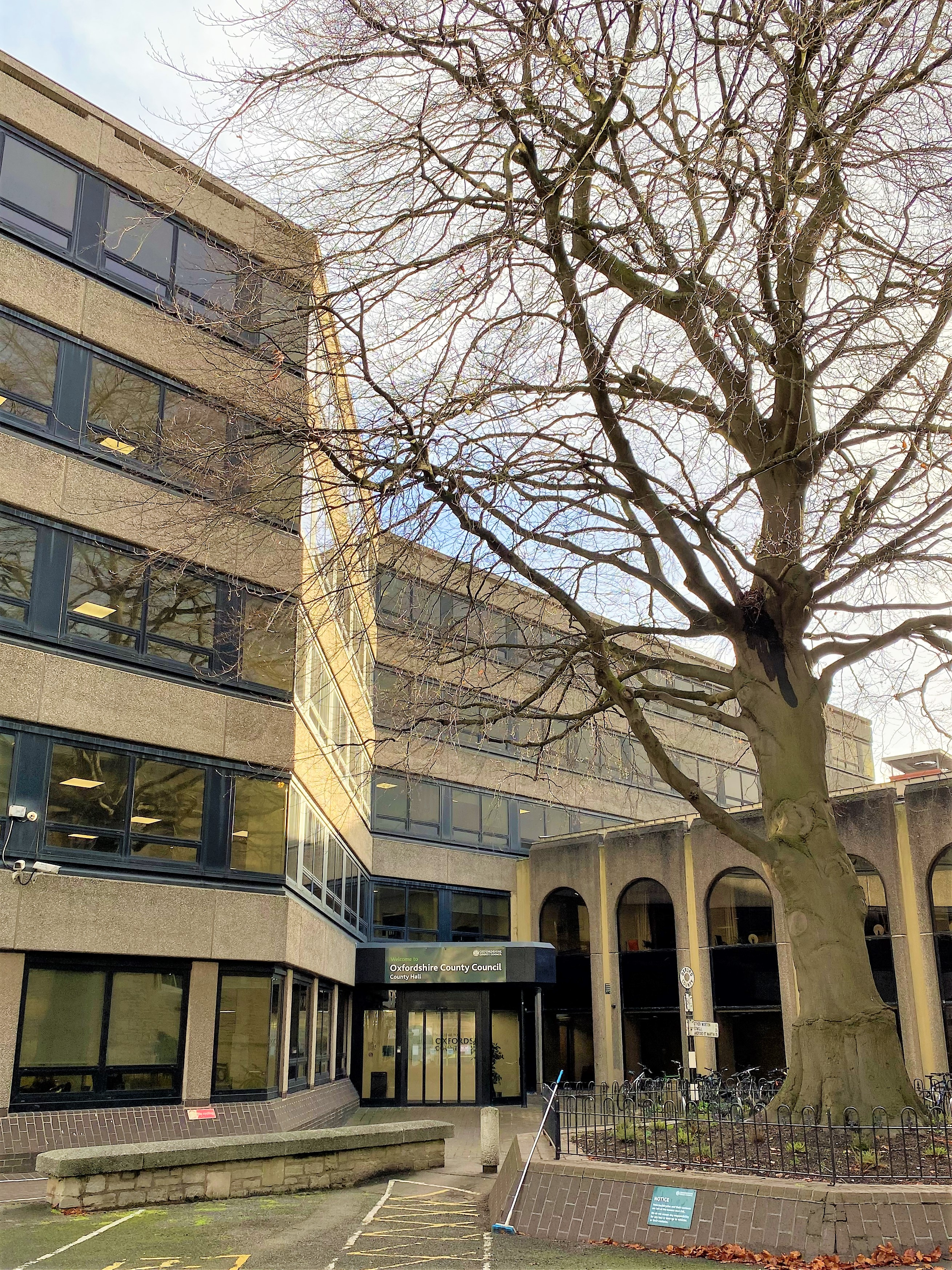
New County Hall

By the early 1970s, the council had outgrown County Offices. A modern facility, known as "New County Hall", was designed by the County Architect to accommodate the County Council's administrative staff: it was built adjacent to the original 1841 County Hall and was completed in 1973. (Note: New County Hall was built on the site of the Swan & Castle Public House which was built in 1896 and demolished in 1968, as well as the Salvation Army Citadel which was built in 1888 and also demolished in 1968.) The design for the five-storey building involved continuous bands of glazing with concrete panels above and below.

The old building continued to be used as a courthouse – it was the venue for the trial and conviction of Donald Neilson for the kidnapping and murder of Lesley Whittle in July 1976 – until the new Oxford Combined Court Centre in St Aldate's was completed in October 1985. Meetings of the county council continued to be held in the council chamber located within the old County Hall.

The 1912 County Offices at Tidmarsh Lane is now used as the Oxford register office. The county record office, which had been based in the basement of the new County Hall, moved to St Luke's Church in Temple Cowley in January 2001.
