= Worcester Street =

Street in west central Oxford, England

Coordinates: 51°45′14″N 1°15′48″W

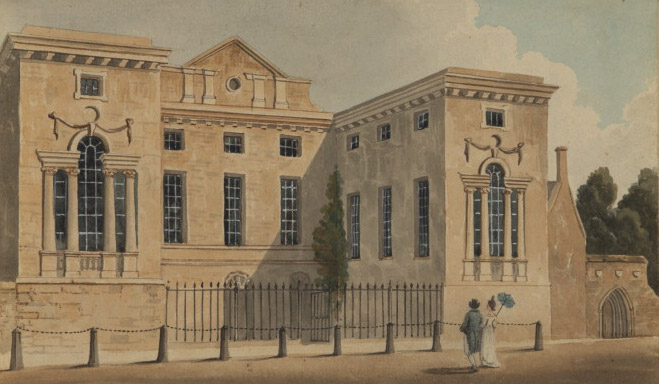
The main entrance of Worcester College in the 19th century, at the northern end of Worcester Street

Worcester Street is a street in west central Oxford, England.

== History ==
The street used to be called Stockwelle Street, also running along the line of Walton Street and Little Clarendon Street, to the north of the current Worcester Street. The name "Stoke" or "Stock" is often associated with streams. At the junction with Hythe Bridge Street, there was a well, known as Cornwell or Cornwall.

The Carmelites (also known as Whitefriars) settled in the street in 1256. The street was built up by 1279 and Gloucester College was established in 1283. The Carmelites moved to Beaumont Palace nearby in 1317. In the Tudor period Cornwell became known as Plato's Well, distinguishing it from Aristotle's Well close to Aristotle Lane to the north. In 1714 Gloucester College was re-established as Worcester College, one of the colleges of the University of Oxford. The street was known as Worcester Street by about 1850.

The Oxford Canal was completed at the end of 1789 with its terminus in a coal wharf on the east side of George Street between New Road and George Street Mews. It had a goods wharf on the west side of Worcester Street between Hythe Bridge Street and Park End Street. The southern part of Worcester Street crossed the canal via a humpback bridge.

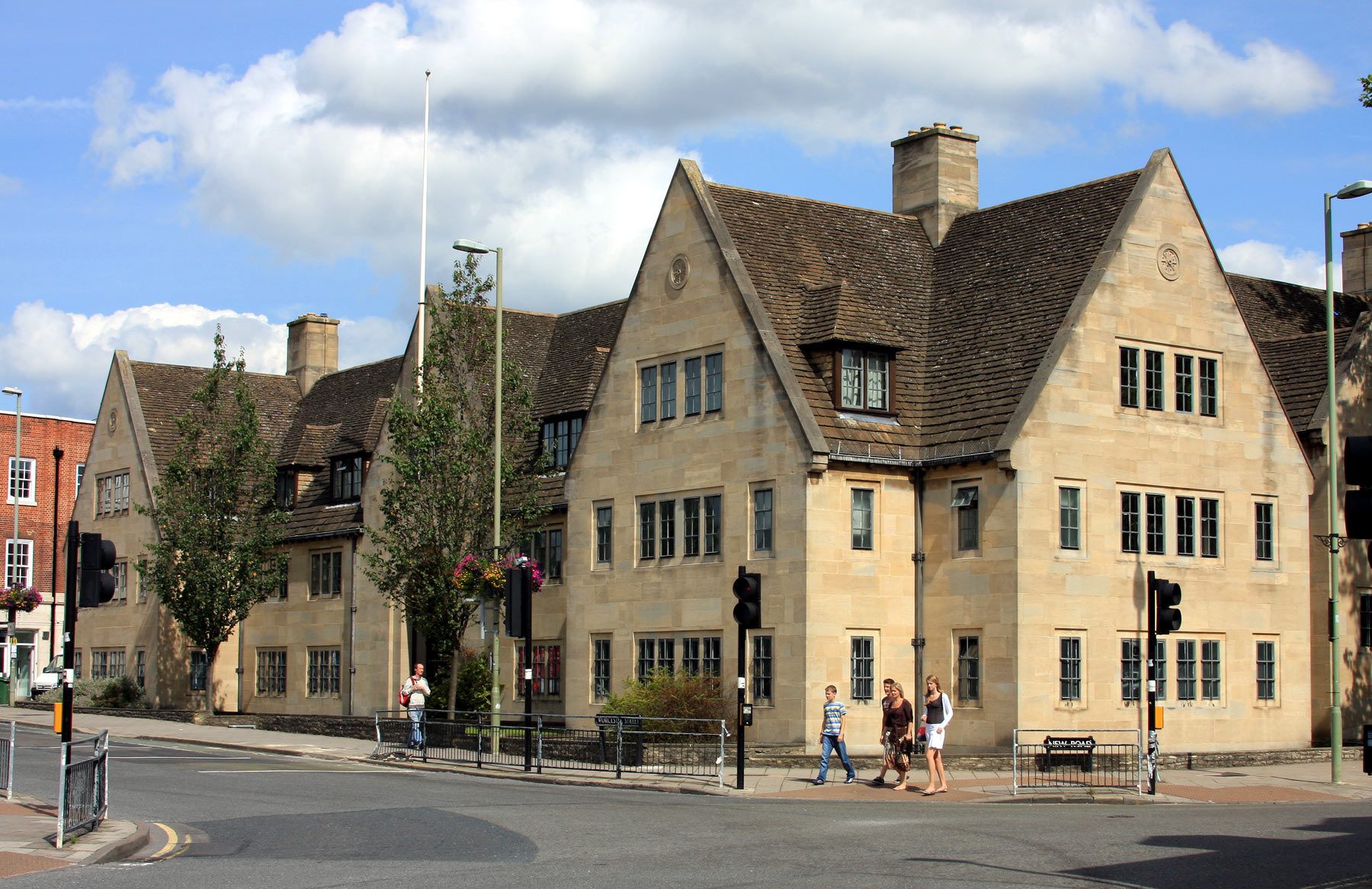
Nuffield College, at the corner of the southern end of Worcester Street (left) and New Road (right)

In 1937 Lord Nuffield bought the coal and goods wharves. In 1951 he had the canal south of Hythe Bridge Street filled in, and had Worcester Street south of the junction with George Street Mews re-aligned and widened.

On the east side of the street, on the site of the coal wharf, Lord Nuffield had Nuffield College built. It is a graduate college of the University of Oxford. On the west side, on the site of the former goods wharf, Nuffield planned to have the college extended. But this part of the college was never built, and the site has been a public car park ever since.

== Location ==
Worcester street runs roughly north–south. The northern section is part of the A4144 road. Its northern end is opposite the eponymous Worcester College, at the junction with Beaumont Street and Walton Street. Worcester College occupies the western side of the street from this junction as far south as the crossroads with Hythe Bridge Street and George Street. Gloucester Green, which includes Oxford's bus station, is to the east. The Refugee Studies Centre, part of the University of Oxford's Department of International Development, is also here.

From the crossroads the A4144 continues west as Hythe Bridge Street.

The southern part of the street links the crossroads with the junction of Park End Street and New Road at the southern end. Worcester Street Car Park is on the west side. Nuffield College is in the east side of the street, between George Street Mews and New Road.

== See also ==
- Buildings of Nuffield College, Oxford
