= Oxford University Society of Change Ringers =

Bellringers society

The Oxford University Society of Change Ringers, founded in 1872, is the official society dedicated to change ringing in Oxford University. Its objects are to promote the art of change ringing in the university and to ring for Sunday services in Oxford during full term.

== History ==
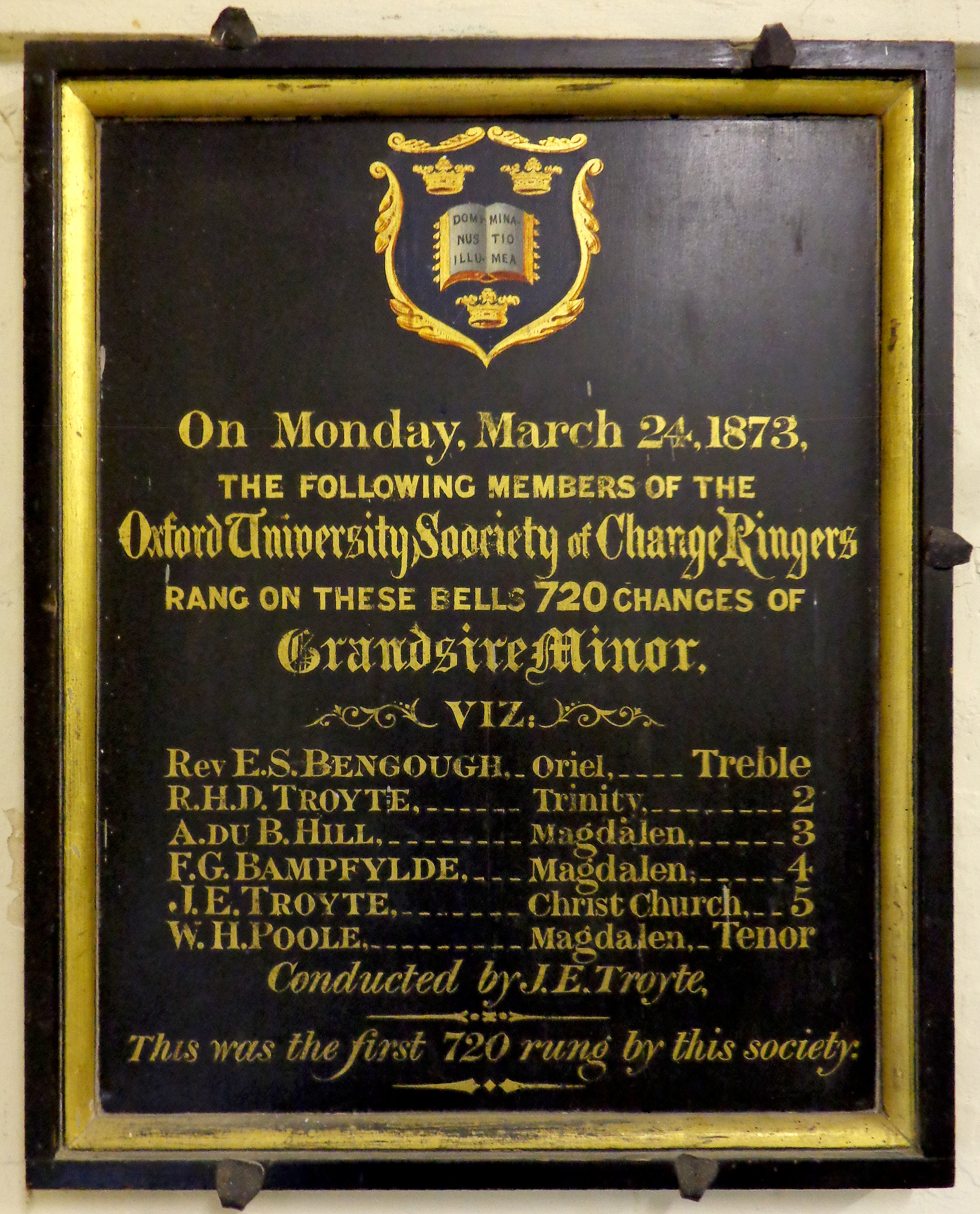
In 1873 the society visited Iffley church.

The society was founded by John Edward Troyte (1848–1932, né Acland) on 2 February 1872, making it the oldest university society dedicated to change ringing. In the early years, the majority of its members were training as clergy or from clerical families. The first peal for the society (Stedman Triples at Drayton) was rung on the 10th anniversary of the foundation. In 1887, the society lapsed, with three brief revivals in 1890, 1892 and 1902, until it was revived in 1920 by Harry Miles and has been in continuous existence ever since. A history of the Society's first 125 years was published in 1997.

For at least twenty years before the Second World War, the standard of ringing never rose much above Plain Bob Minor and Grandsire Doubles. The ban on ringing tower bells during the war could have caused the society to die out once more, but instead emphasis was placed on learning to ring handbells well with additional tied bell practices at New College. This was so successful that when the ban was lifted there were enough competent ringers to be able to ring more than had previously been possible, and surprise major began to be rung regularly. Since then the standard of ringing has mostly been quite high, with the number of peals rung peaking around 1976.

For some time the society had "no fixed abode", ringing at a number of towers, including All Saints (now Lincoln College library), St Ebbe's and St Giles. By 1939 the church of St Mary Magdalen (then a 6-bell tower) had become the society's base, although other towers were still borrowed for 8-bell practices on a regular basis. In its early history the society was dependent on the help of the local bands in offering their towers for practices. This co-operation has continued to the present day, with the links between the society and the Oxford Society being strengthened further with the bell improvement projects and augmentations at St Thomas the Martyr and St Mary Magdalen from the 1970s.

== Current activities ==
The society rings for Sunday services at the Oxford churches of St Thomas, St Mary Magdalen, St Mary the Virgin and St Ebbe's as well as New College. During full term, weekly practices are held at St Mary Magdalen and less frequently at St Thomas, where everything from rounds and call changes to the Standard 8 Surprise Major and Cambridge and Yorkshire Surprise Royal is rung. A day's outing is organised each term, the one in Hilary Term being joint with the Cambridge University Guild. During the Easter vacation a four-day tour is organised in a different area of the country where both present and past members visit several rings of bells each day. On the first Saturday of February an annual dinner is held which in recent years has taken place at Harris Manchester College. The society enters the SUA striking competitions in Michaelmas term and has hosted the event on a number of occasions. The master of the society in 2025 is Ritchie Usherwood.
