= William Henry Butler =

Wine merchant and Mayor of Oxford

William Henry Butler (24 February 1790 – 11 October 1865) was an English wine merchant and Mayor of Oxford.

William Butler was the ninth of the ten children. His parents were James and Jane (née Slatter) Butler from All Saints parish in Oxford. He married Elizabeth Briggs at St Giles' Church, Northampton, on 13 February 1817.

Butler became a wine merchant in the middle section of the High Street in central Oxford. Around 1820, he moved to new premises at Carfax, in the very centre of Oxford, on the corner of St Aldate's and Queen Street.

William Butler joined Oxford's Common Council on 30 September 1815, was elected Senior Chamberlain in 1819, and Senior Bailiff in 1824. He became Mayor of Oxford from January to October 1836. Soon after being Mayor, Butler retired to live at Linden House (now known as the Priory) in the Old High Street at Headington, east of central Oxford. He became a magistrate and alderman.

In 1865, William Butler was buried in the churchyard at Carfax in the centre of Oxford in the grave of his first wife Elizabeth Briggs and their two infant daughters. In 1900, the church was demolished to make way for road improvements and as a consequence the grave and tombstone were forgotten. It is probable the tombstone was made by either John Gibbs of Oxford (father of William Henry Butler's second wife, also named Elizabeth) or one of John Gibbs's employees. The tombstone is still in its original position and can be viewed at the rear of the tower.
