= Oxford Society =

Oxford Society may refer to:

- Oxford Society of Change Ringers, established in 1734, is a society dedicated to change ringing in Oxford, England
- Oxford Union Society
- The Oxford Society, previously associated with Oxford University
