= City Church, Oxford =

Church in Oxford, England

Coordinates: 51.7537°N 1.2583°W

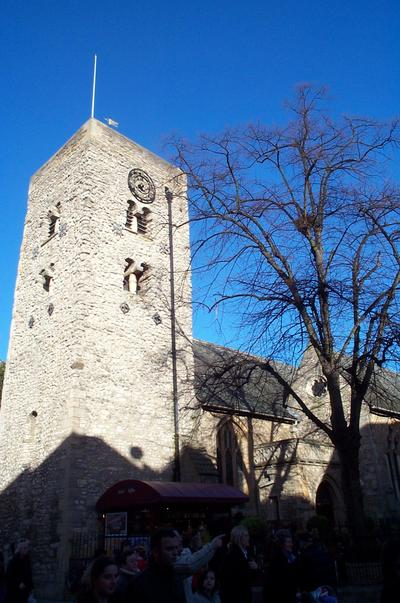
St Michael at the North Gate, the current City Church in Oxford, since 1971.

The City Church in Oxford, England, is where the mayor and corporation (local government officials) are expected to worship.

There have been three churches designated as the City Church in Oxford since the function was established around 1122:

1. St Martin's Church, Carfax (c. 1122–1896), now demolished apart from the tower
2. All Saints Church, High Street (1896–1971), deconsecrated, and now the library of Lincoln College
3. St Michael at the North Gate, Cornmarket (1971 onwards), the present City Church.
