= Carfax, Oxford =

Crossroads; central area of Oxford in England

Coordinates: 51.7520°N 1.2577°W

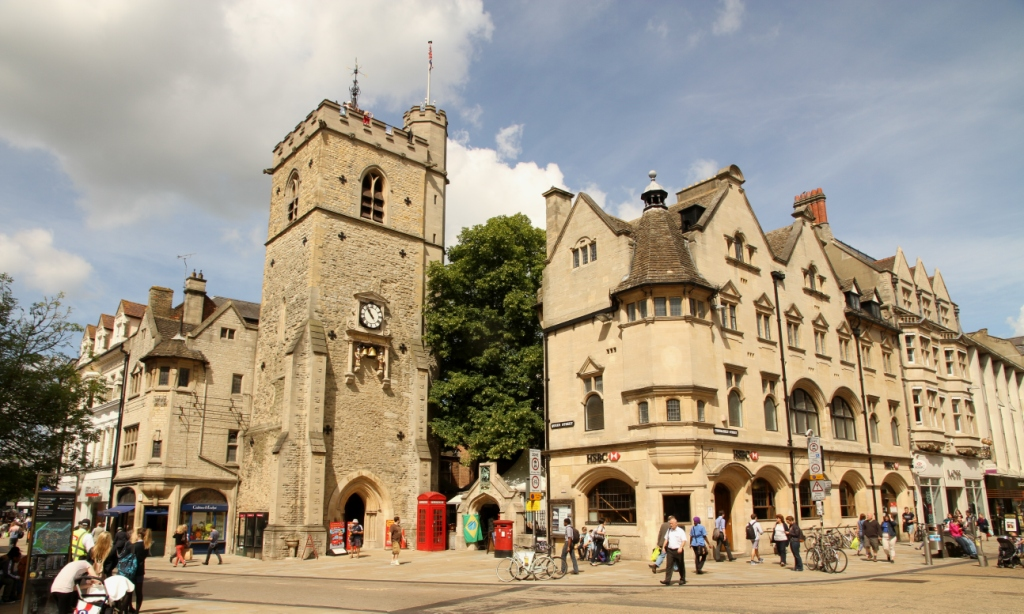
St Martin's tower (centre left) and the HSBC building (right), seen from the corner of High Street and St Aldate's

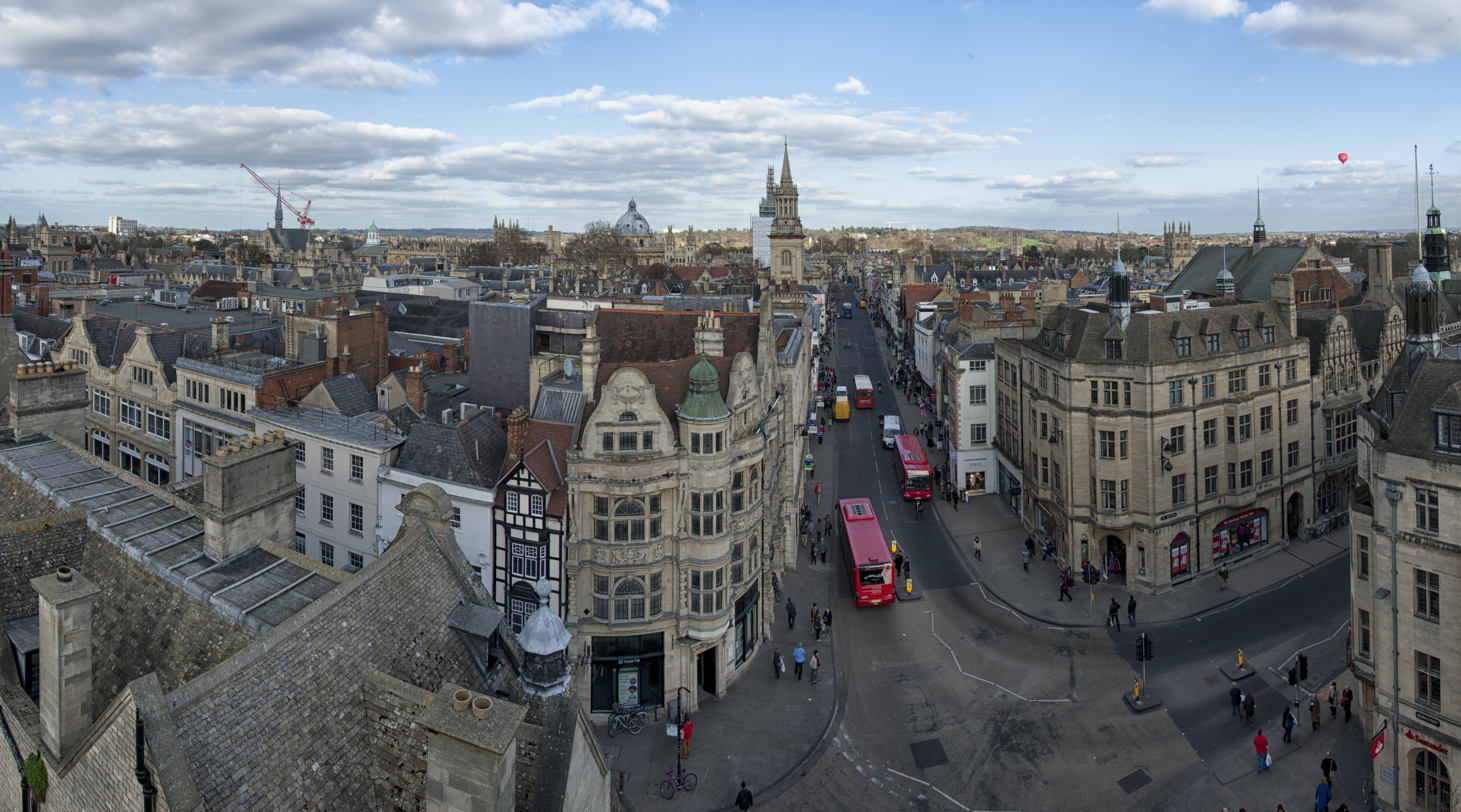
View from the top of St Martin's Tower

Carfax is the junction of St Aldate's (south), Cornmarket Street (north), Queen Street (west) and the High Street (east) in Oxford, England. It is considered to be the centre of the city. The name "Carfax" derives from the Latin quadrifurcus via the French carrefour, both of which mean "crossroads". The Carfax Tower, also known as St Martin's Tower (the remaining part of the City Church of St Martin of Tours), is a prominent landmark and provides a look-out over the town.

== Tower ==
St Martin's Tower, popularly called "Carfax Tower", is on the northwest corner of Carfax. It is all that remains of the 12th-century St Martin's Church and is now owned by Oxford City Council. St Martin's was the official City Church of Oxford, where the Mayor and Corporation were expected to worship, between about 1122 and 1896, when the main part of the church was demolished to make more room for road traffic, and All Saints' Church in the High Street then became the City Church for 75 years. All Saints then became the library of Lincoln College, and St Michael at the North Gate became the City Church.

The tower is 74 feet (23 m) tall, and the City Council stipulates that no building in central Oxford may be built higher than it (a rule broken by the Blavatnik School of Government). It is a Grade II listed building.

The tower still has a ring of six bells: five recast from the original ring by Richard Keene of Woodstock in 1676 and one cast by Keene two years later. They are rung on special occasions by the Oxford Society of Change Ringers.

There is a clock that chimes the quarter hours on a pair of bells cast by John Taylor & Co of Loughborough in 1898. The clock's current dial and surroundings were designed by Sir TG Jackson and installed in 1898. In 1938–39 the clock mechanism was replaced with an electric one made by Gents' of Leicester.

One can climb to the top of the tower for a view of the Oxford skyline. The tower is open November – February: 10:00 – 15:00, March: 10:00 – 16:00, April – September: 10:00 – 17:00 and October: 10:00 – 16:00.

== Events ==
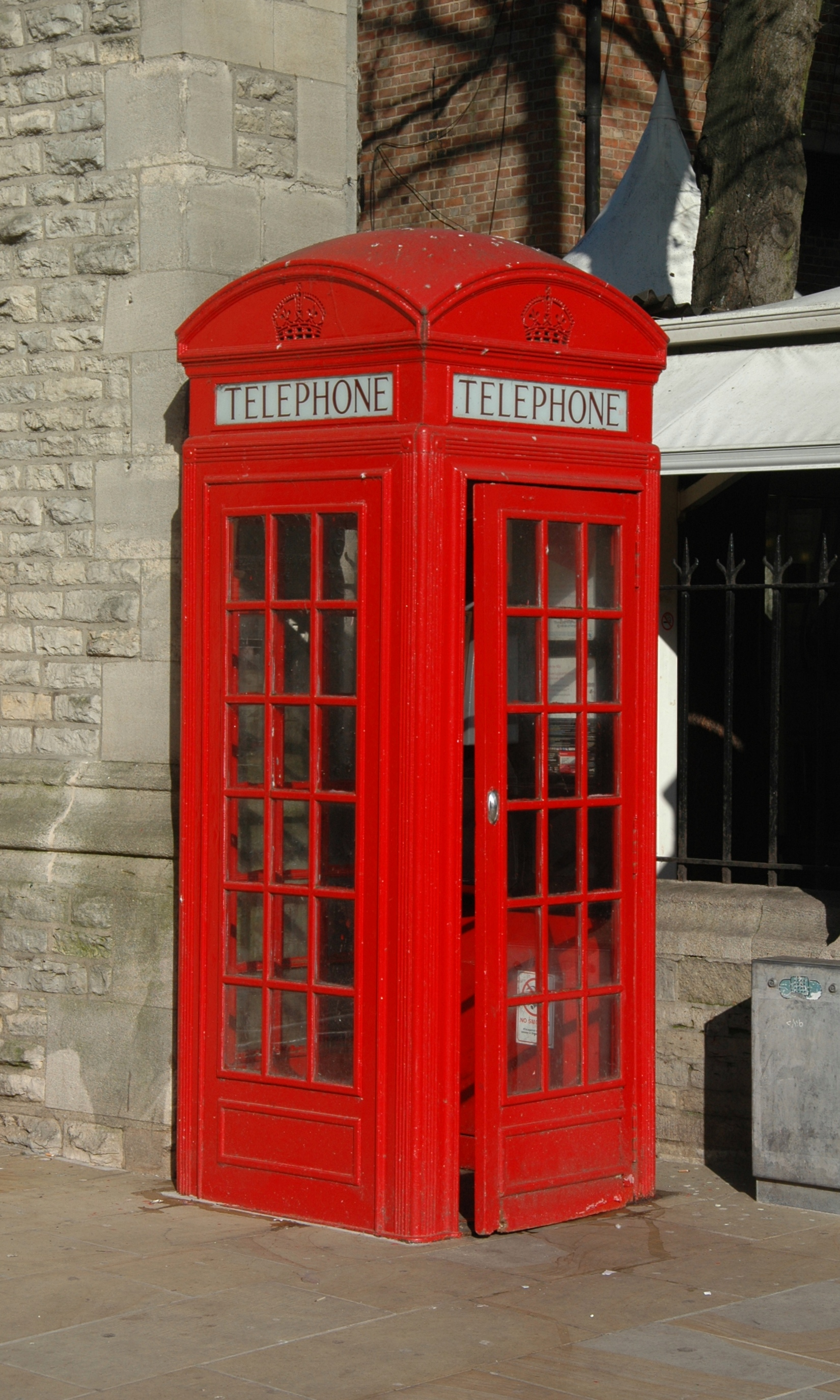
Grade II-listed K2 telephone kiosk beside St Martin's tower

The St Scholastica Day riot of 1355 began with an altercation in the Swindlestock Tavern (now the site of the Santander Bank on the southwest corner of Carfax, between St Aldate's and Queen Street) between two students and the taverner.

In 1865 William Henry Butler, who had been Mayor of Oxford in 1836, was buried in St Martin's churchyard in the grave of his first wife Elizabeth Briggs and their two infant daughters. In 1900 the church was demolished to make way for road improvements and as a consequence the grave and tombstone were forgotten. It is probable the tombstone was made by either John Gibbs of Oxford (father of Butler's second wife) or one of Gibbs's employees. The tombstone is still in situ and can be seen behind the tower. There is a campaign to protect the tombstone for posterity.

== University regulations ==
Comparable to St Mary the Great for the University of Cambridge, Carfax plays a role in the disciplinary regulations of the University of Oxford. For example, the university requires some students to reside within six miles (9.7 km) of Carfax.

== See also ==
- Carfax Conduit
- Battle of Carfax
- Frideswide Square
