= Oxford Martyrs =

Three Anglican bishops burnt at the stake (1555)

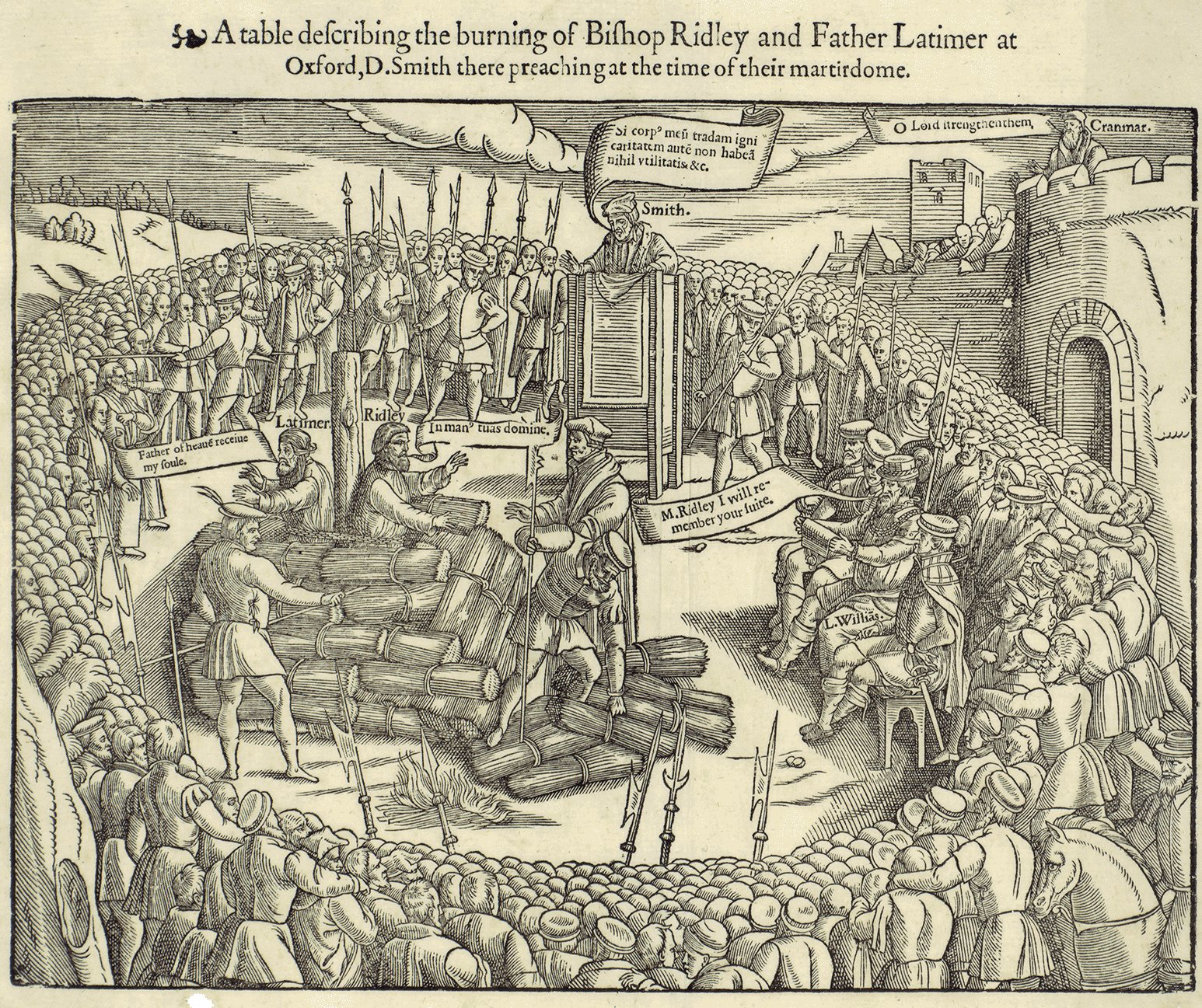
- The burning of Latimer and Ridley, from the Book of Martyrs by John Foxe (1563)
- Born: England
- Died: 1555 and 1556, Oxford, England
- Means of martyrdom: Burned at the stake
- Venerated in: Anglican Communion
- Feast: October 16

The Oxford Martyrs were Protestants tried for heresy in 1555 and burnt at the stake in Oxford, England, for their religious beliefs and teachings, during the Marian persecution in England.

The three martyrs were the Church of England bishops Hugh Latimer and Nicholas Ridley, and Thomas Cranmer, the Archbishop of Canterbury.

== History ==
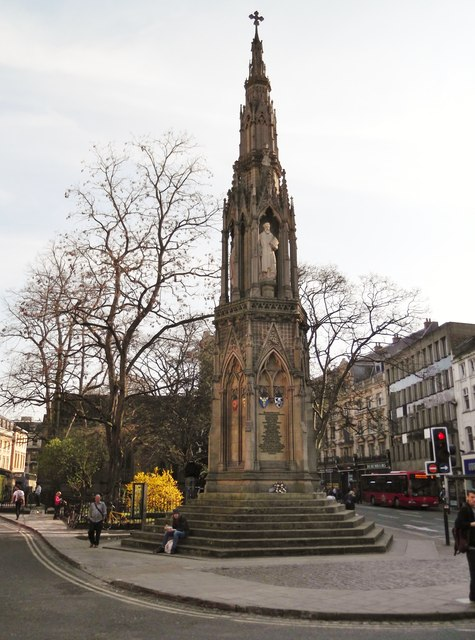
The Martyrs' Memorial, Oxford, completed in 1843

The three were tried at University Church of St Mary the Virgin, the official church of the University of Oxford on the High Street, Oxford. The men were imprisoned at the former Bocardo Prison near the extant St Michael at the North Gate church (at the north gate of the city walls) in Cornmarket Street. The door of their cell is on display in the tower of the church.

The men were burnt at the stake just outside the city walls to the north, where Broad Street is now located. Latimer and Ridley were burnt on 16 October 1555 for denying the Roman Catholic dogma of Transubstantiation. Cranmer was burnt five months later on 21 March 1556.

A small area paved with granite setts forming a cross in the centre of the road in front of Balliol College marks the site. The Victorian spire-like Martyrs' Memorial, at the south end of St Giles' nearby, commemorates the events.

== In literature ==
Lydia Sigourney's poem "Latimer and Ridley". was published in her 1827 collection of poetry.

== Gallery ==
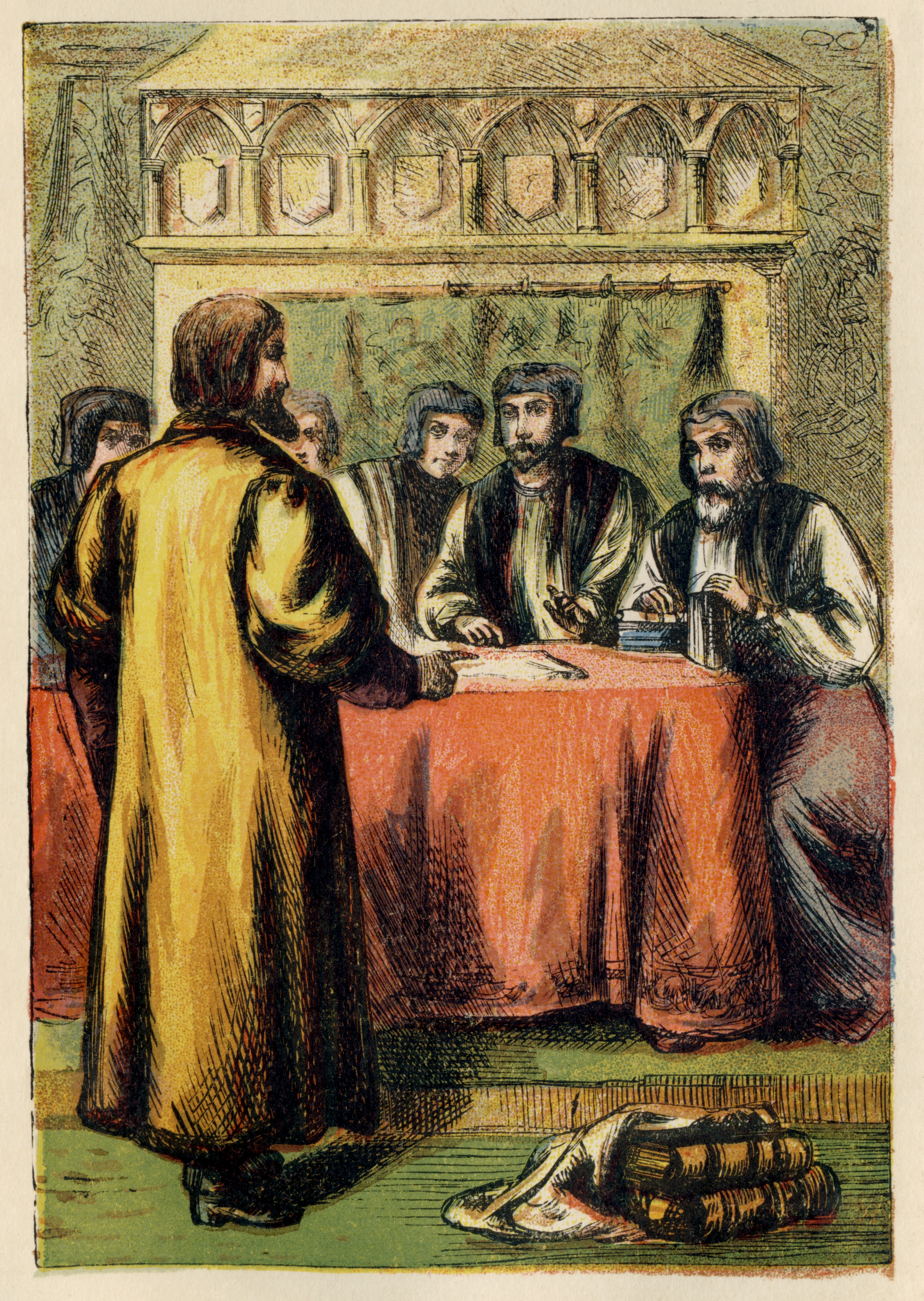
"Latimer before the Council", from an 1887 edition of Foxe's Book of Martyrs illustrated by Kronheim.

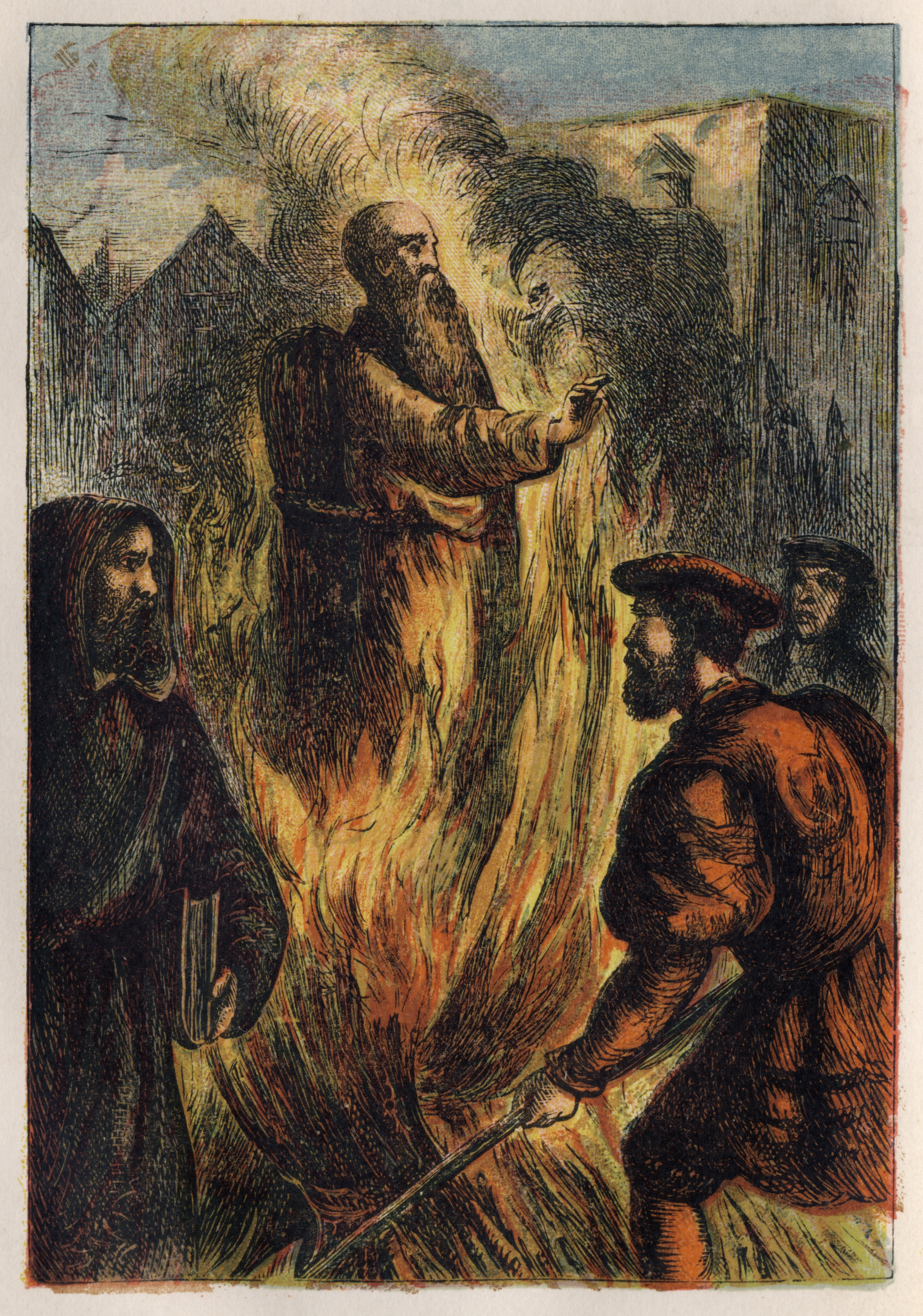
"Death of Cranmer", from the same.

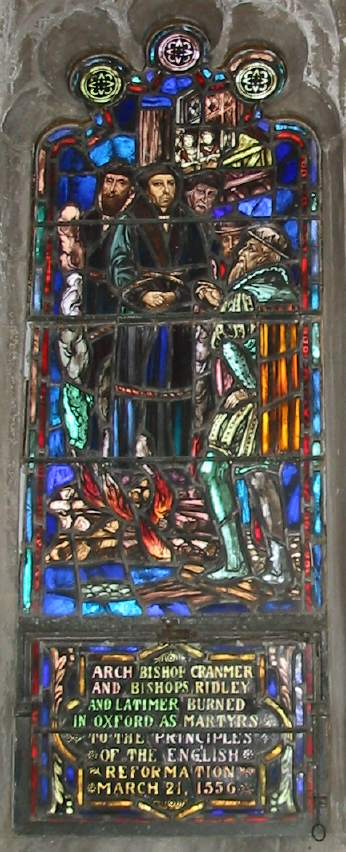
Stained-glass window depicting the Oxford Martyrs. Located in Christ Church, Little Rock, Arkansas, USA.

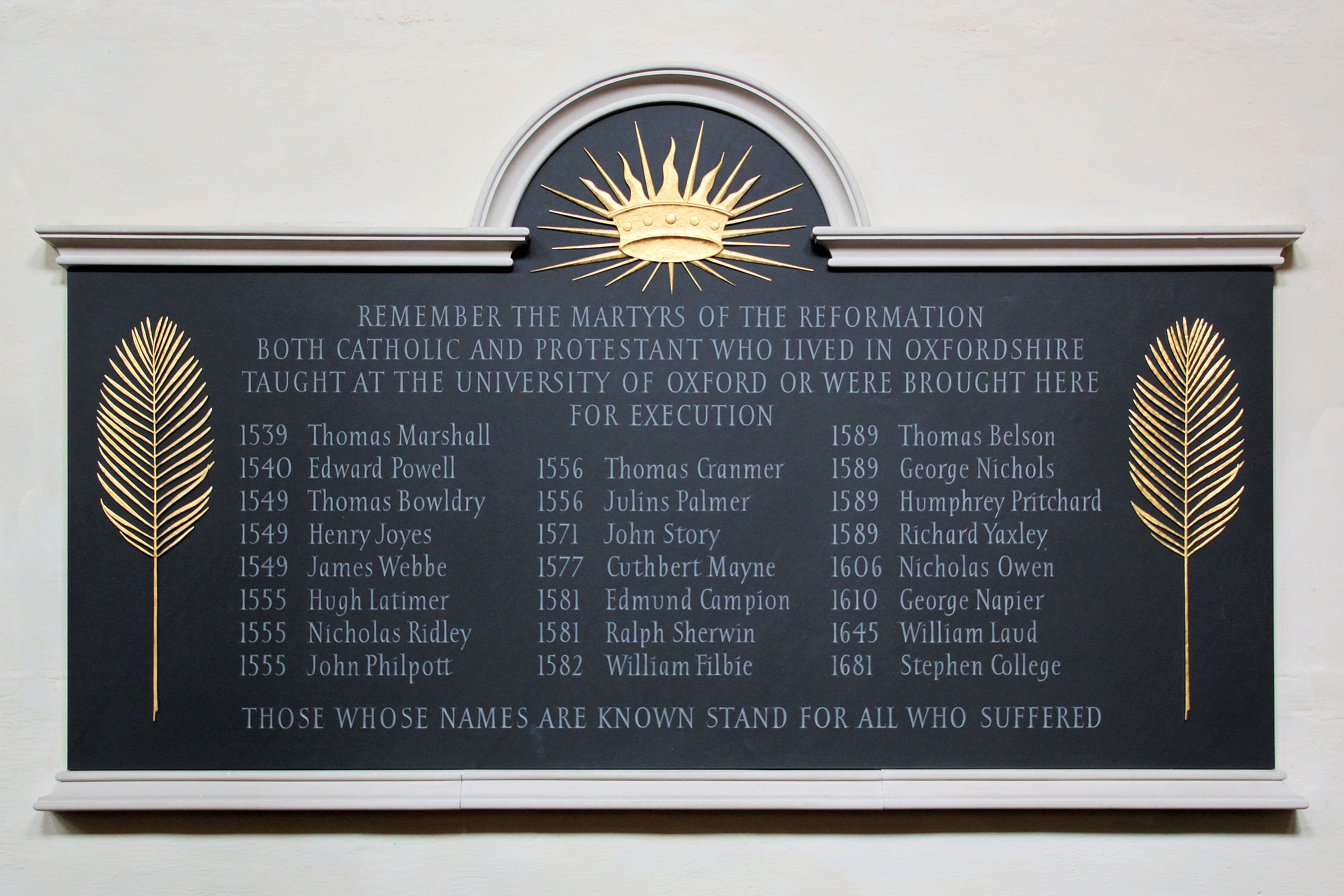
A memorial plaque, installed in 2008, to the Martyrs of the Reformation both Catholic and Protestant who lived in Oxfordshire, taught at the University of Oxford, or were brought to Oxford for execution. Northern wall of the University Church of St Mary the Virgin, Oxford.

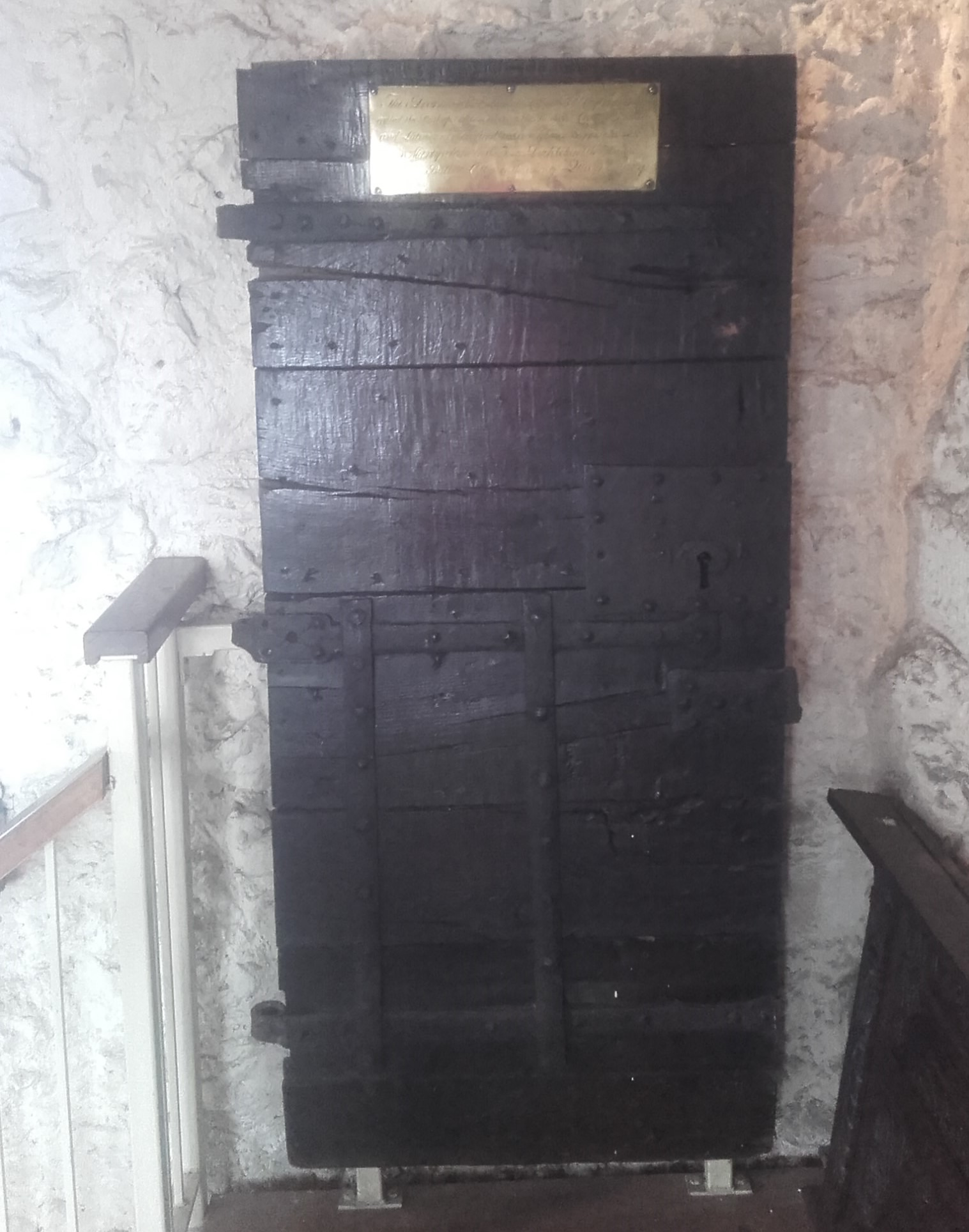
The cell door from the Bocardo Prison preserved in the tower of St Michael at the North Gate, Oxford.

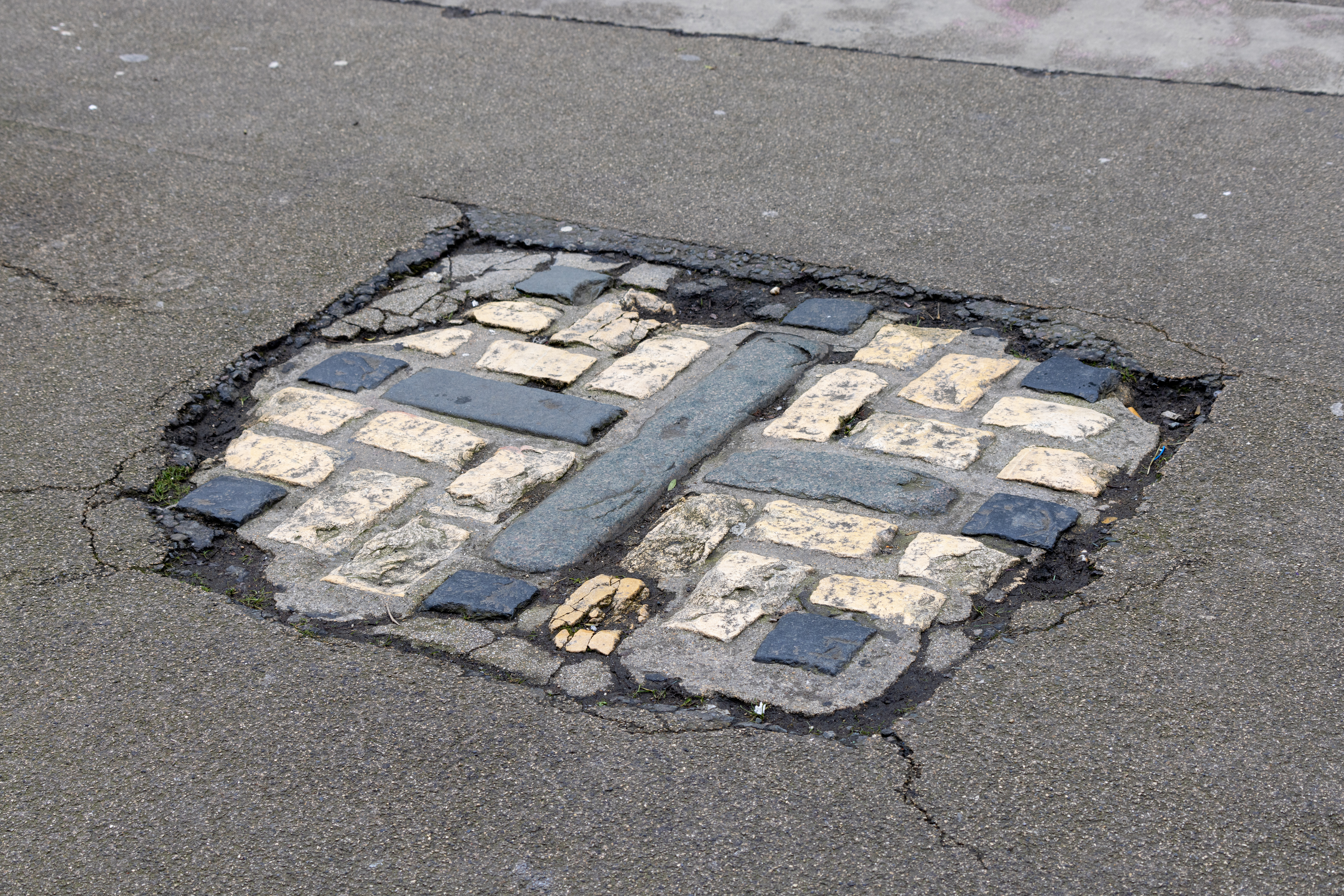
Cross marking the site of the executions in Broad Street

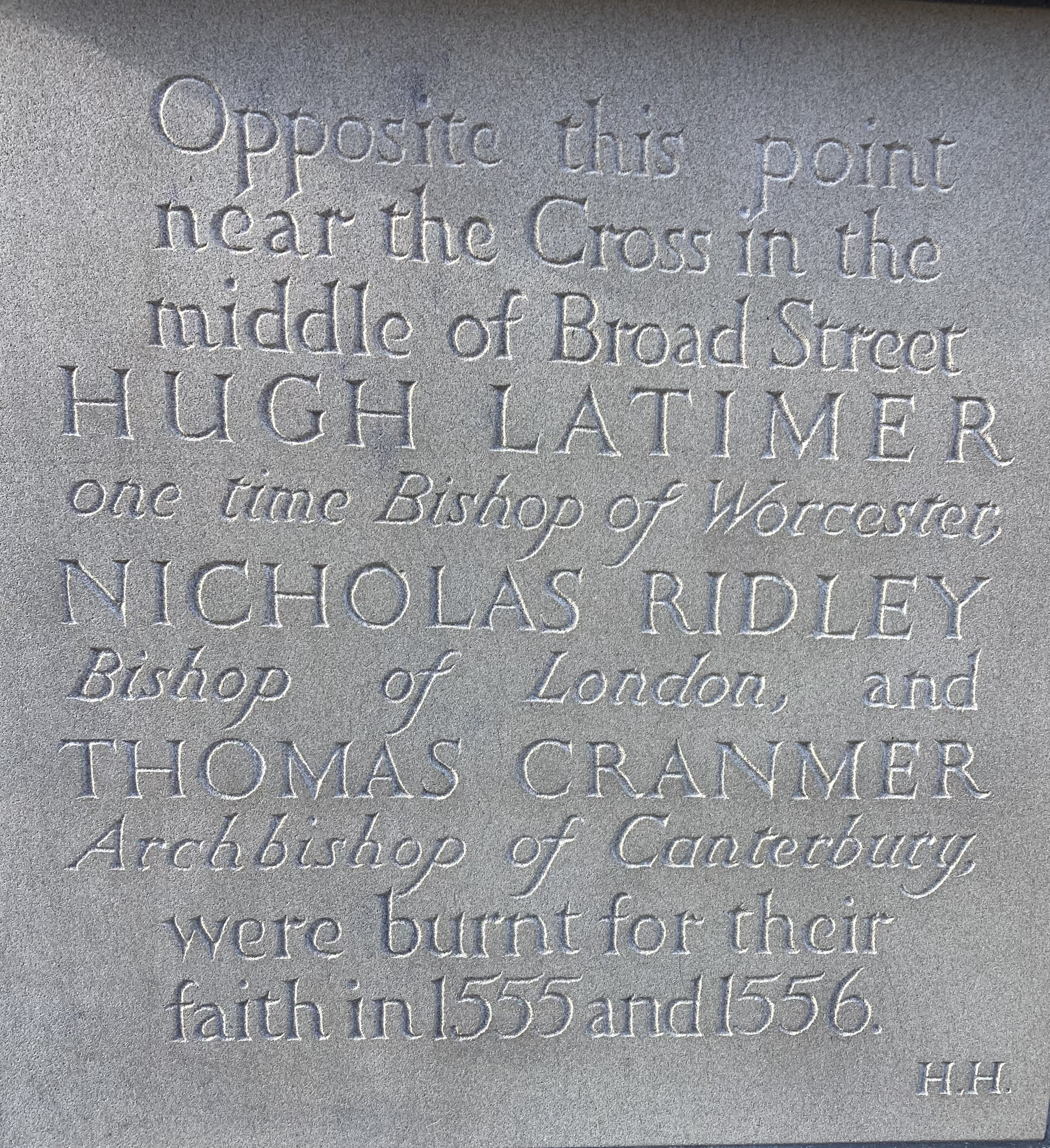
Oxford martyrs plaque on Broad St. at Balliol College.

== See also ==
- Christian martyrs
- James Brooks, one of the papal sub-delegates in the Royal Commission for the trial
- List of Protestant martyrs of the English Reformation
- Martyrs' Memorial, Oxford
- Oxford Movement
- Religion in the United Kingdom
