= St Mary Magdalen's Church, Oxford =

St Mary Magdalen
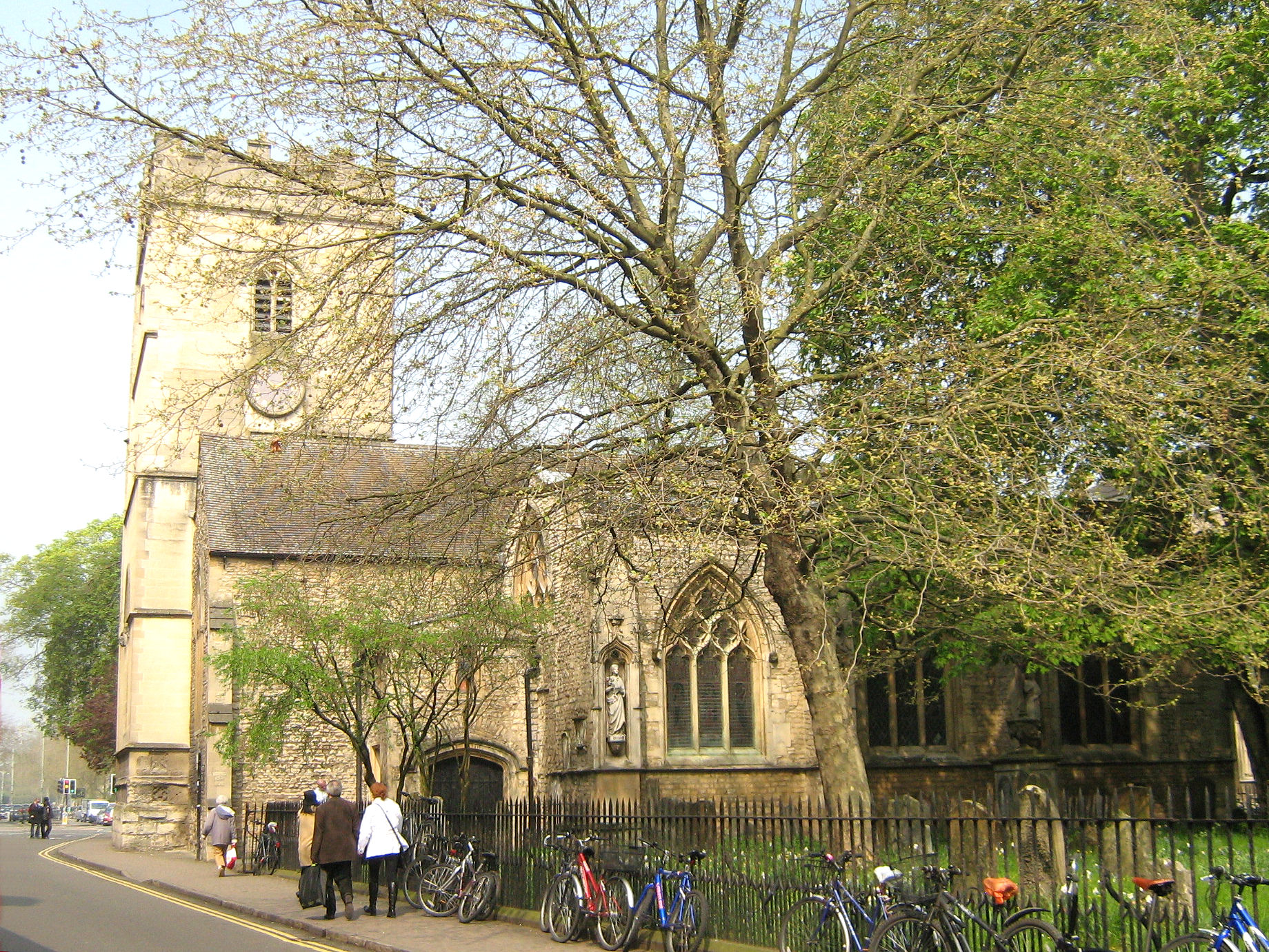

- Location within Oxford city centre
- 51.754620°N 1.258826°W
- OS grid reference: SP 51258 06471
- Location: Magdalen Street, Oxford
- Country: England
- Denomination: Church of England
- Churchmanship: Anglo-Catholic
- Website: stmarymagdalenoxford.org.uk

History
- Dedication: Mary Magdalene

Architecture
- Functional status: active
- Heritage designation: Grade I listed
- Designated: 12 January 1954
- Architects: North aisle by GG Scott and WB Moffatt; South aisle by Edward Blore; Alterations to tower and chancel by William Wilkinson
- Style: Gothic, Gothic Revival

Specifications
- Materials: Jurassic limestone

Administration
- Province: Province of Canterbury
- Diocese: Diocese of Oxford
- Archdeaconry: Oxford
- Deanery: Oxford
- Parish: Oxford St Mary Magdalen

Clergy
- Vicar: Fr. Jonathan Lewis-Jong

St Mary Magdalen is a Church of England parish church in Magdalen Street, Oxford, England, dedicated to Jesus' companion Mary Magdalene. It is one of the city's ancient parish churches and is a Grade I listed building.

== Worship ==
Worship at St Mary Magdalen's is high church which conforms to Anglo-Catholicism. Mass is celebrated 15 times a week: twice daily on weekdays, and three times on Sundays. The main celebration is at 10:30 am on Sunday mornings.

== History ==
A Saxon wooden church was built outside the Saxon walls of the city of Oxford, just beyond the North Gate. This church was burnt down in 1074, so Robert D'Oyly, the Norman Constable of Oxford, had single-aisle chapel built to replace it.

In 1194 Saint Hugh, Bishop of Lincoln, had the church rebuilt. Work of that period survives in the east wall of the chancel wall and in the south aisle, and the altar dedicated to St Thomas Becket. By 1235 the church had an altar dedicated to the Virgin Mary. The chancel was rebuilt late in the 13th century. A century later the scholars of newly founded Balliol College had an oratory dedicated to St Catherine in the present north aisle. In 1320 the Carmelites founded a chapel in the south aisle, which survives as the present Lady Chapel.

The west tower was built between 1511 and 1531. The south porch, with a room above it, was also added around this time.

In 1841–42 the church was restored. The architects for the north or "Martyrs' Aisle" were George Gilbert Scott, then young and unknown, and his partner W. B. Moffatt. Scott and Moffatt also had the Norman arch to the chancel removed. The north aisle complemented Scott's Martyrs' Memorial just north of the church. It was the first Gothic Revival interior in Oxford.

The architect for the restoration of the south aisle was Edward Blore.

In 1874–75 the 13th-century chancel was altered by raising the floor before the altar and adding a screen, the windows of the west tower were opened into the church and the bells were re-hung. The architect for these works was William Wilkinson.

The church holds an early 14th-century carved wooden chest known as the "Jewel Chest".

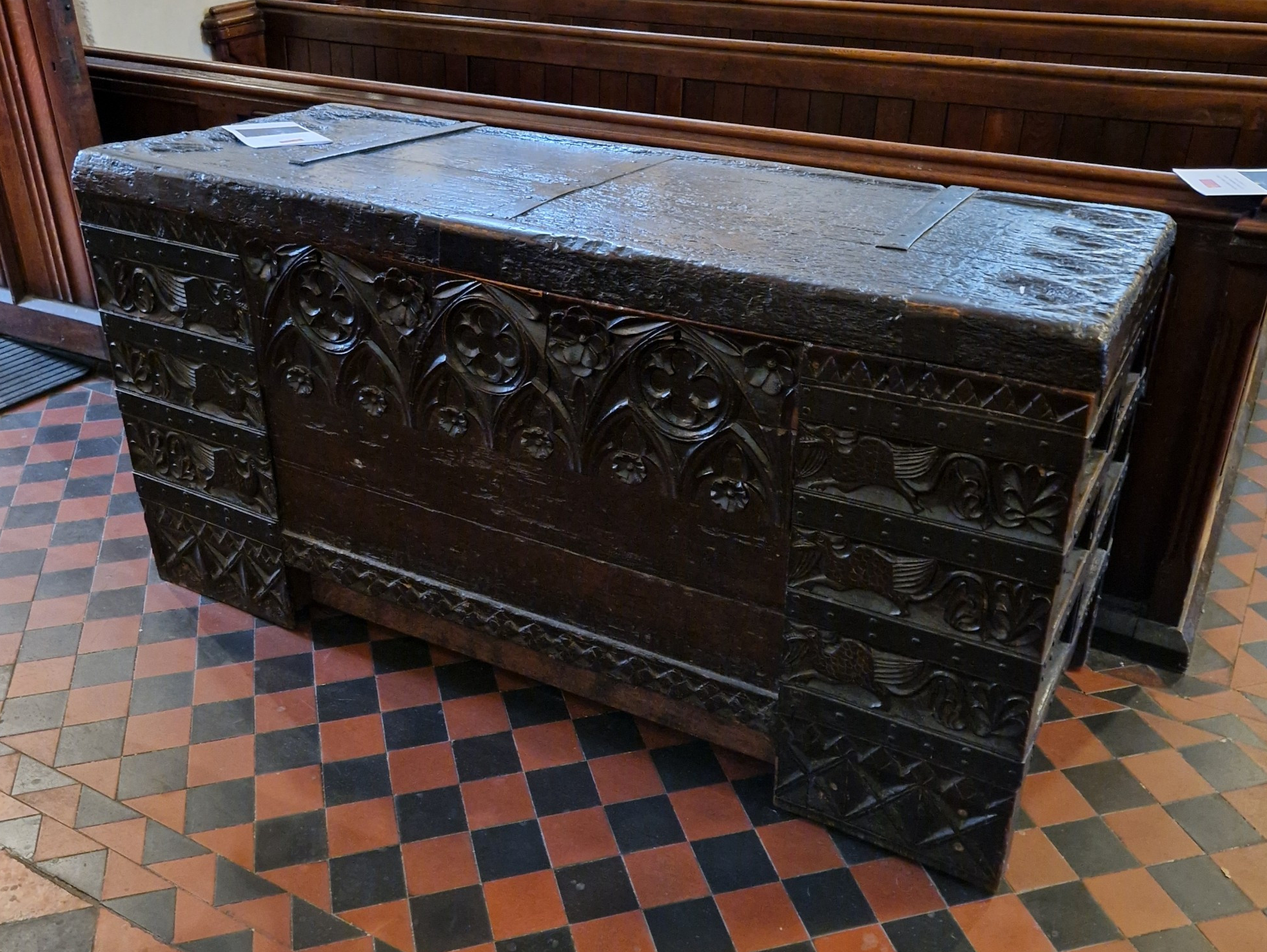
The medieval oak "Jewel Chest" within the church.

The antiquary and biographer John Aubrey was buried in the churchyard.

== Bells ==
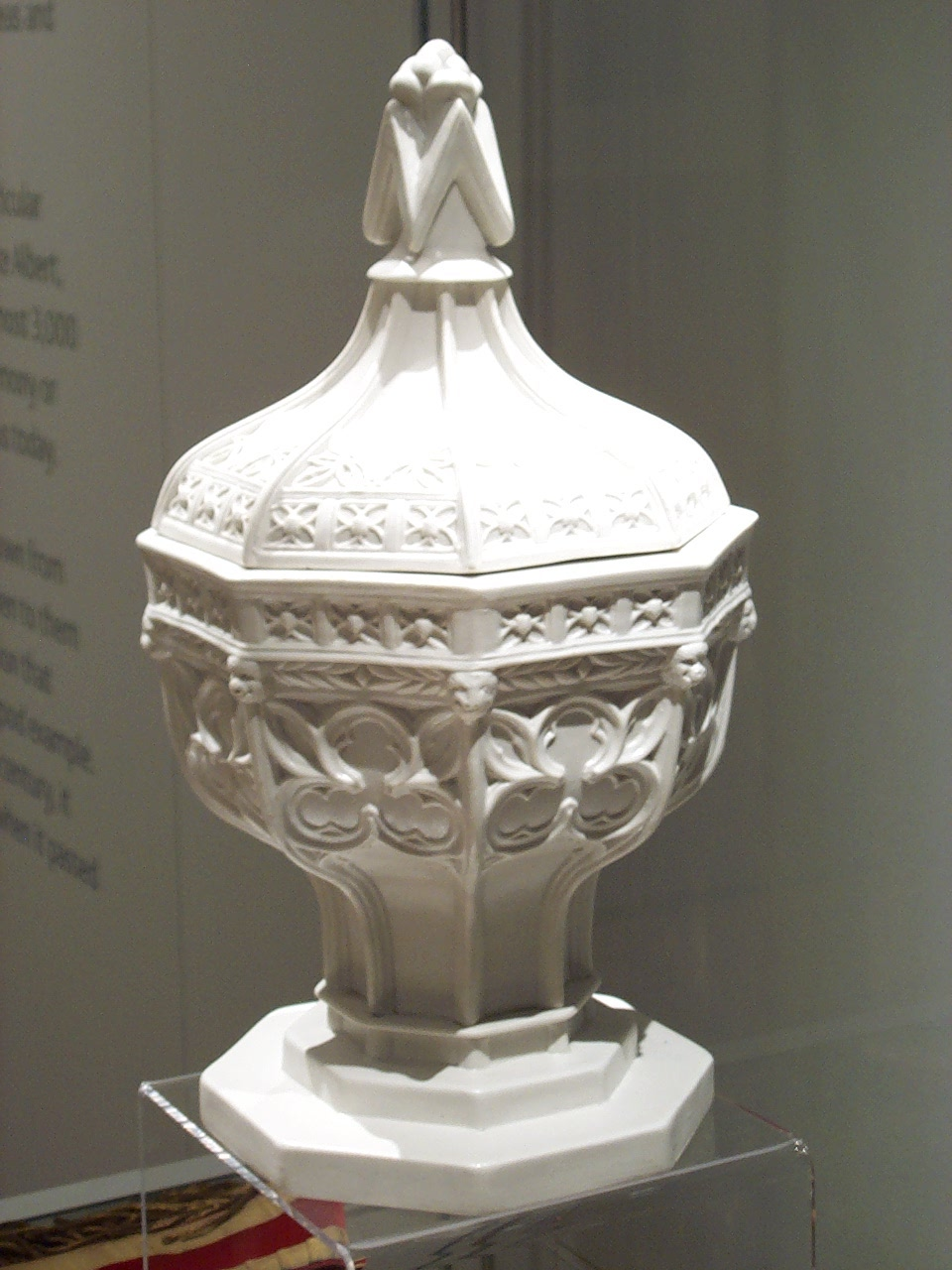
Small baptismal font formerly in St Mary Magdalen's Church

The west tower has a ring of 10 bells, all cast or re-cast by John Taylor & Co of Loughborough. The tenor bell was re-cast in 1988. The fifth, sixth, seventh, eighth and ninth bells were re-cast in 1990. The third and fourth bells were cast in 2000. There were eight bells in the ring until 2001, when John Taylor & Co cast and hung the present treble and second bell.

The Oxford University Society of Change Ringers has rung the bells since the 1930s.

== See also ==
- Oxford University Society of Change Ringers
- St Michael at the Northgate, to the south
- St Giles' Church, to the north

== Bibliography ==
- Crossley, Alan; Elrington, C. R., eds. (1979). "Churches". A History of the County of Oxford. Victoria County History. Vol. IV: The City of Oxford. London: Oxford University Press for the Institute of Historical Research. pp. 369–412.
- Sherwood, Jennifer; Pevsner, Nikolaus (1974). Oxfordshire. The Buildings of England. Harmondsworth: Penguin. pp. 293–294. ISBN 0-14-071045-0.
