= Bocardo Prison =

Prison in Oxford, England

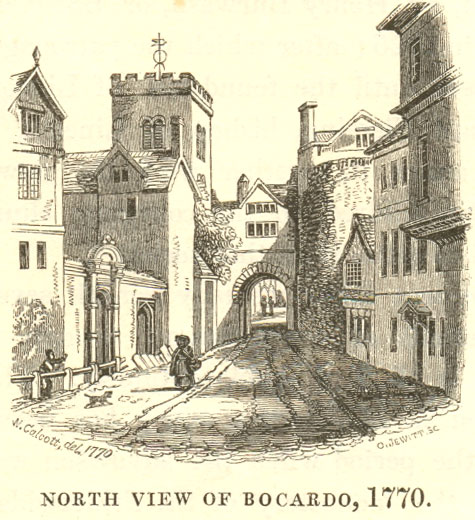
Engraving of part of Bocardo prison by N. Calcott in 1770, over Oxford's old Northgate.

The Bocardo Prison in Oxford, England existed until 1771. Its origins were medieval, and its most famous prisoners were the Protestant Oxford martyrs (Thomas Cranmer, Hugh Latimer and Nicholas Ridley) in 1555. Other prisoners included a number of Quakers, like Elizabeth Fletcher, among the first preachers of the Friends to come to Oxford in 1654.

It was located near the church of St Michael at the North Gate; the prison consisted in fact of rooms in a watchtower by Oxford's North Gate, the tower being attributed to Robert D'Oyly, a Norman of the eleventh century, though also said to be originally a Saxon construction of c. 1000–50; the gate itself was called also Bocardo Gate. The rooms were over the gate, and there was a box in the church for charitable contributions to the prisoners.

== History ==
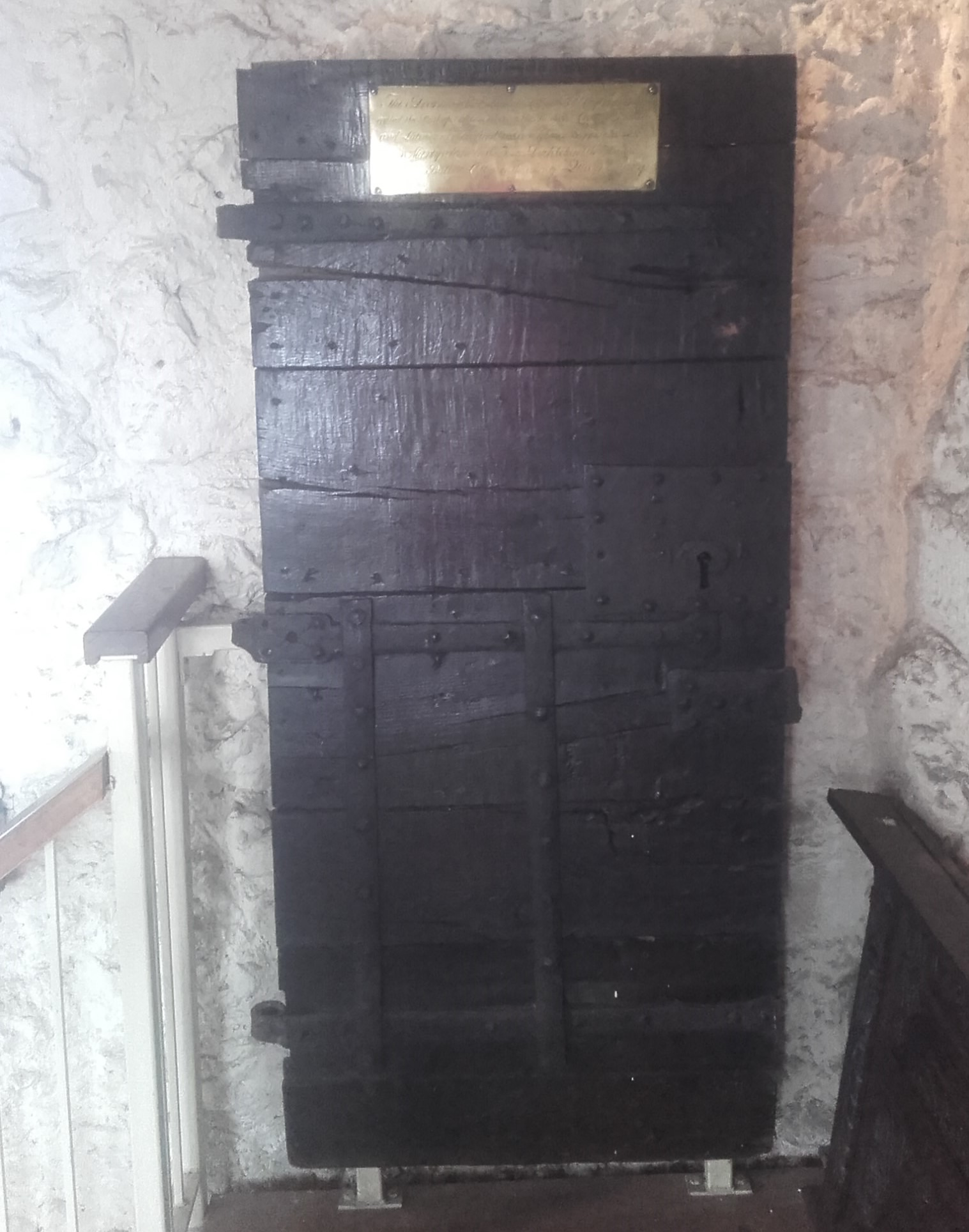
The door of the cell from the Bocardo Prison where Thomas Cranmer was held before his execution in 1556; one of the Oxford Martyrs. It is now preserved in the Saxon bell tower of St Michael at the North Gate Church, Oxford, which is adjacent to the site of the prison.

John Powderham, who claimed to be the real king in the reign of Edward II of England, was imprisoned there in or shortly before 1318, prior to being hanged. The prison was demolished in 1771, for a road construction scheme, following an Act of Parliament in 1770, and as part of the wider city redevelopment in Oxford under John Gwynn.

== Name ==
Venn diagram representation of Modus Bocardo

Bocardo is also a mnemonic for a traditional syllogism in scholastic logic. An example:

Some cats have no tails.
All cats are mammals.
Some mammals have no tails.

There is a folk etymology for the name: because Bocardo was found to be one of the harder forms of valid syllogism for students to learn, it was said to be the name of a prison that was hard to escape from. One of the rooms in Newgate Prison was also named bocardo. An essay presented to the Oxford University Genealogical and Heraldic Society in 1835 suggested that the name was "derived from the Anglo-Saxon, bochord, a library or archive". It also says that it is "probable" that "the academic prison lent its name to logic".

== See also ==
- Jacob Barnet affair of 1612
