= Nicholas Ridley (martyr) =

Bishop of London; Anglican saint

The Right Reverend Nicholas Ridley
- Bishop of London and Westminster
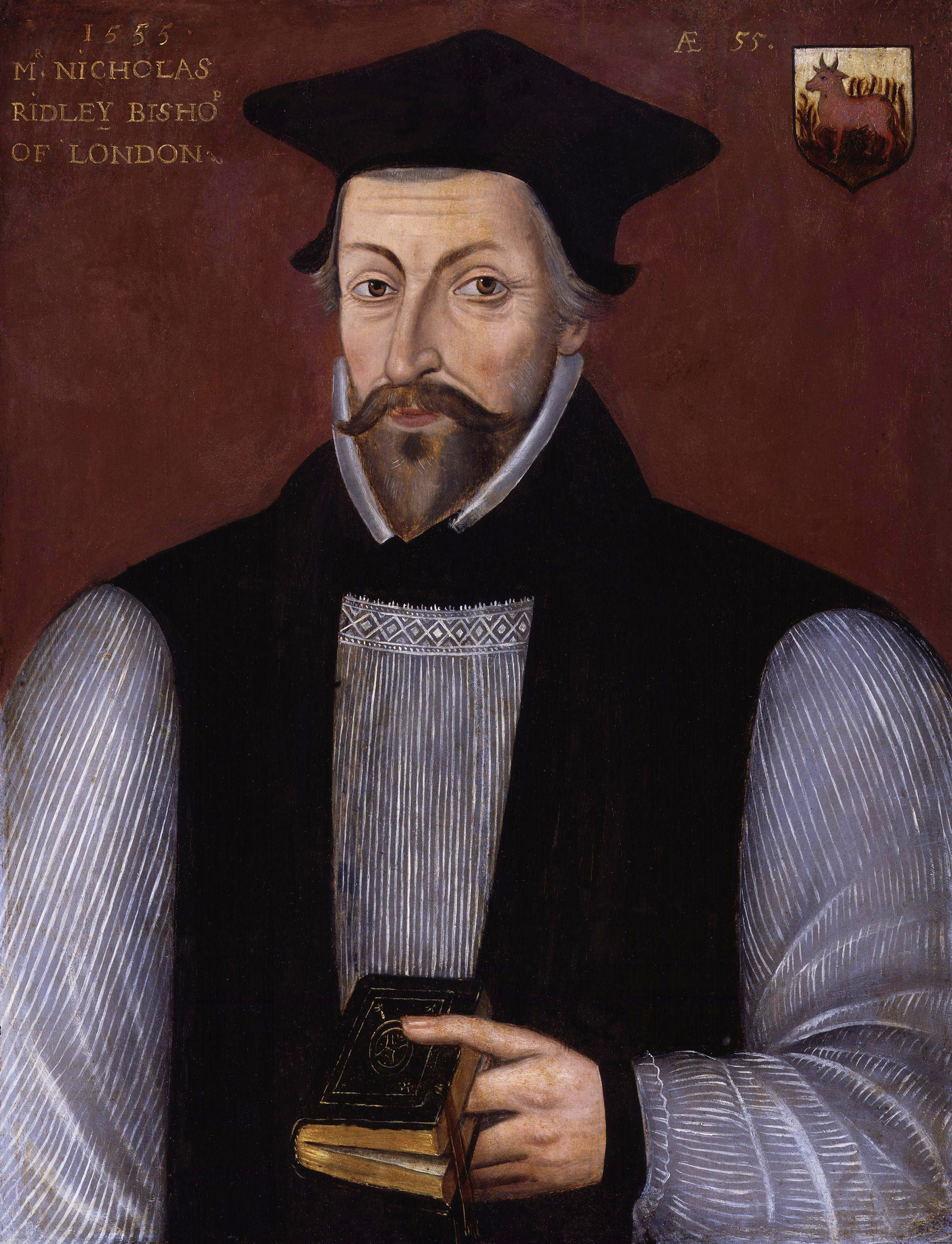
- Late 16th-century portrait of Nicholas Ridley in the National Portrait Gallery, London
- Church: Church of England
- Installed: 1550
- Term ended: 1553
- Predecessor: Edmund Bonner, Bishop of London
- Successor: Edmund Bonner, Bishop of London
- Other post: Bishop of Rochester (1547–1550)

Orders
- Consecration: 5 September 1547 by Henry Holbeach

Personal details
- Born: Nicholas Ridley c. 1500 South Tynedale, Northumberland, England
- Died: 16 October 1555 Oxford, Oxfordshire, England
- Denomination: Anglicanism

Sainthood
- Feast day: 16 October
- Venerated in: Anglican Communion
- Title as Saint: Oxford Martyr

Nicholas Ridley (c. 1500 – 16 October 1555) was an English Bishop of London (the only bishop called "Bishop of London and Westminster"). Ridley was one of the Oxford Martyrs burned at the stake during the Marian Persecutions, for his teachings and his support of Lady Jane Grey. He is remembered with a commemoration in the calendar of saints (with Hugh Latimer) in some parts of the Anglican Communion (Church of England) on 16 October.

== Early years and advancement (c.1500–50) ==
Ridley came from a prominent family in Tynedale, Northumberland. He was the second son of Christopher Ridley, first cousin of Lancelot Ridley and grew up in Unthank Hall from the old House of Unthank located on the site of an ancient watch tower or pele tower. As a boy, Ridley was educated at the Royal Grammar School, Newcastle, and Pembroke College, Cambridge, where he proceeded to Master of Arts in 1525. Soon afterward he was ordained as a priest and went to the Sorbonne, in Paris, for further education. After returning to England around 1529, he became the senior proctor of Cambridge University in 1534. Around that time there was significant debate about the Pope's supremacy. Ridley was well versed on Biblical hermeneutics, and through his arguments the university came up with the following resolution: "That the Bishop of Rome had no more authority and jurisdiction derived to him from God, in this kingdom of England, than any other foreign bishop." He graduated B.D. in 1537 and was then appointed by the Archbishop of Canterbury, Thomas Cranmer, to serve as one of his chaplains. In April 1538, Cranmer made him vicar of Herne, in Kent.

In 1540–1, he was made one of the King's Chaplains, and was also presented with a prebendal stall in Canterbury Cathedral. In 1540 he was made Master of Pembroke College and in 1541 was awarded the degree of Doctor of Divinity. In 1543 he was accused of heresy, but he was able to beat the charge. Cranmer had resolved to support the English Reformation by gradually replacing the old guard in his ecclesiastical province with men who followed the new thinking. Ridley was made the Bishop of Rochester in 1547, and shortly after coming to office, directed that the altars in the churches of his diocese should be removed, and tables put in their place to celebrate the Lord's Supper. In 1548, he helped Cranmer compile the first Book of Common Prayer and in 1549 he was one of the commissioners who investigated Bishops Stephen Gardiner and Edmund Bonner. He concurred that they should be removed. John Ponet took Ridley's former position. Incumbent conservatives were uprooted and replaced with reformers.

When Ridley was appointed to the see of London by letters patent on 1 April 1550, he was called the "Bishop of London and Westminster" because the Diocese of London had just re-absorbed the dissolved Diocese of Westminster.

== Vestments controversy (1550–3) ==
Ridley played a major part in the vestments controversy. John Hooper, having been exiled during King Henry's reign, returned to England in 1548 from the churches in Zurich that had been reformed by Zwingli and Heinrich Bullinger in a highly iconoclastic fashion. When Hooper was invited to give a series of Lenten sermons before the king in February 1550, he spoke against Cranmer's 1549 ordinal whose oath mentioned "all saints" and required newly elected bishops and those attending the ordination ceremony to wear a cope and surplice. In Hooper's view, these requirements were vestiges of Judaism and Roman Catholicism, which had no biblical warrant for Christians since they were not used in the early Christian church.

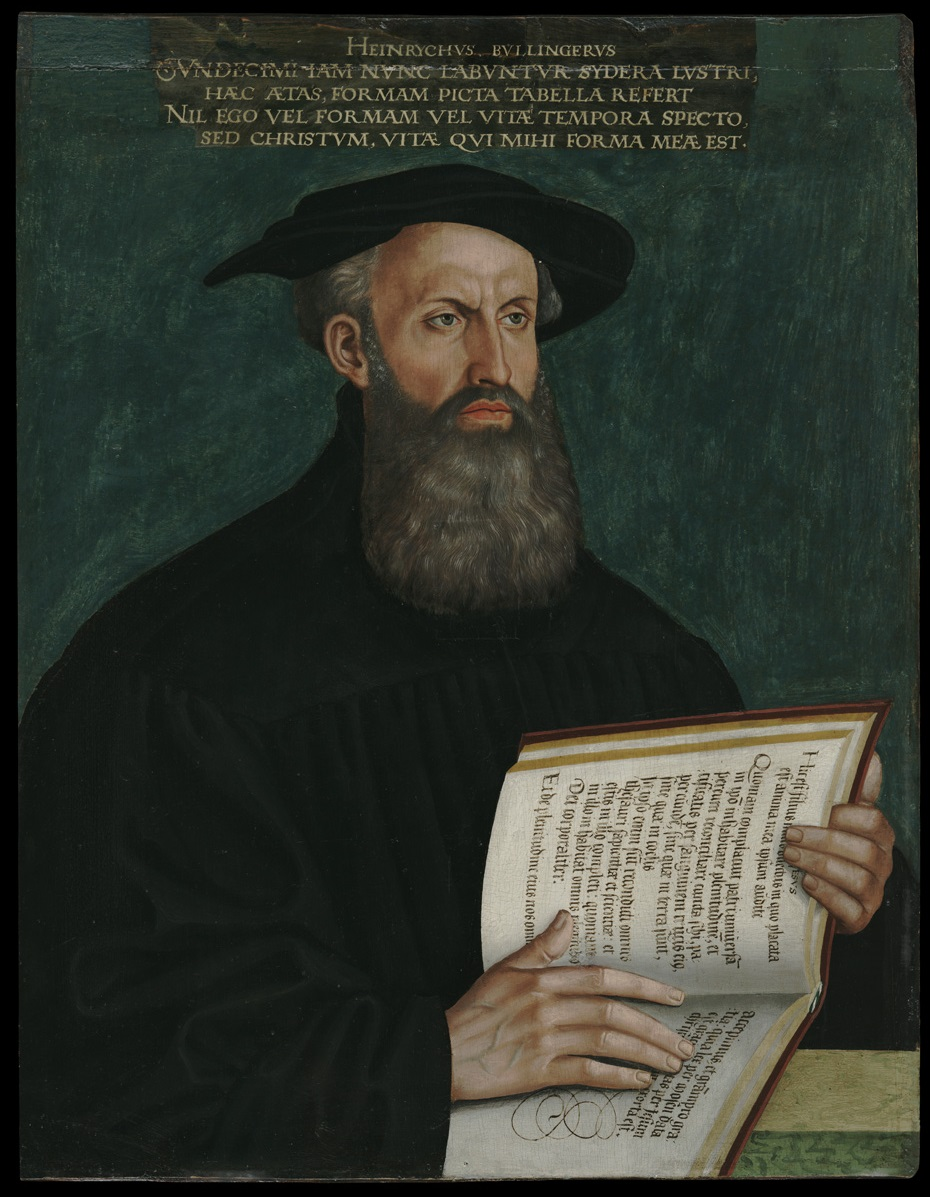
Heinrich Bullinger, a major influence on John Hooper, Ridley's opponent in the vestments controversy.

Summoned to answer to the Privy Council and archbishop—who were primarily concerned with Hooper's willingness to accept the royal supremacy, which was also part of the oath for newly ordained clergy—Hooper evidently made sufficient reassurances, as he was soon appointed to the bishopric of Gloucester. Hooper declined the office, however, because of the required vestments and oath by the saints. The king accepted Hooper's position, but the Privy Council did not. Called before them on 15 May 1550, a compromise was reached. Vestments were to be considered a matter of adiaphora, or Res Indifferentes ("things indifferent", as opposed to an article of faith), and Hooper could be ordained without them at his discretion, but he must allow that others could wear them. Hooper passed confirmation of the new office again before the king and council on 20 July 1550 when the issue was raised again, and Cranmer was instructed that Hooper was not to be charged "with an oath burdensome to his conscience".

Cranmer assigned Ridley to perform the consecration, and Ridley refused to do anything but follow the form of the ordinal as it had been prescribed by Parliament. Ridley, it seems likely, had some particular objection to Hooper. It has been suggested that Henrician exiles like Hooper, who had experienced some of the more radically reformed churches on the continent, were at odds with English clergy who had accepted and never left the established church. John Henry Primus also notes that on 24 July 1550, the day after receiving instructions for Hooper's unique consecration, the church of the Austin Friars in London had been granted to Jan Laski for use as a Stranger church. This was to be a designated place of worship for Continental Protestant refugees, a church with forms and practices that had taken reforms much further than Ridley would have liked. This development—the use of a London church virtually outside Ridley's jurisdiction—was one that Hooper had had a hand in.

The Privy Council reiterated its position, and Ridley responded in person, agreeing that vestments are indifferent but making a compelling argument that the monarch may require indifferent things without exception. The council became divided in opinion, and the issue dragged on for months without resolution. Hooper now insisted that vestments were not indifferent, since they obscured the priesthood of Christ by encouraging hypocrisy and superstition. Warwick disagreed, emphasising that the king must be obeyed in things indifferent, and he pointed to St Paul's concessions to Jewish traditions in the early church. Finally, an acrimonious debate with Ridley went against Hooper. Ridley's position centred on maintaining order and authority; not the vestments themselves, Hooper's primary concern.

=== Hooper–Ridley debate ===
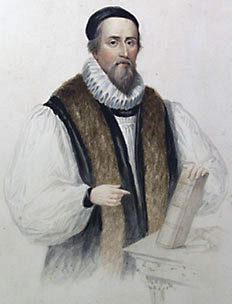
John Hooper clashed with Ridley as he advocated more radical reforms. Portrait by Henry Bryan Hall, 1839.

In a Latin letter dated 3 October 1550, Hooper laid out his argument contra usum vestium. With Ridley's reply (in English), it marks the first written representation of a split in the English Reformation. Hooper's argument is that vestments should not be used as they are not indifferent, nor is their use supported by scripture, a point he takes as self-evident. He contends that church practices must either have express biblical support or be things indifferent, approval for which is implied by scripture. Furthermore, an indifferent thing, if used, causes no profit or loss. Ridley objected in his response, saying that indifferent things do have profitable effects, which is the only reason they are used. Failing to distinguish between conditions for indifferent things in general and the church's use of indifferent things, Hooper then all but excludes the possibility of anything being indifferent in the four conditions he sets:

1) An indifferent thing has either an express justification in scripture or is implied by it, finding its origin and foundation in scripture.

Hooper cites Romans 14:23 (whatever is not faith is sin), Romans 10:17 (faith comes from hearing the word of God), and Matthew 15:13 (everything not "planted" by God will be "rooted up") to argue that indifferent things must be done in faith, and since what cannot be proved from scripture is not of faith, indifferent things must be proved from scripture, which is both necessary and sufficient authority, as opposed to tradition. Hooper maintains that priestly garb distinguishing clergy from laity is not indicated by scripture; there is no mention of it in the New Testament as being in use in the early church, and the use of priestly clothing in the Old Testament is a Hebrew practice, a type or foreshadowing that finds its antitype in Christ, who abolishes the old order and recognises the spiritual equality, or priesthood, of all Christians. The historicity of these claims is further supported by Hooper with a reference to Polydore Vergil's De Inventoribus Rerum.

In response, Ridley rejected Hooper's insistence on biblical origins and countered Hooper's interpretations of his chosen biblical texts. He points out that many non-controversial practices are not mentioned or implied in scripture. Ridley denies that early church practices are normative for the present situation, and he links such primitivist arguments with the Anabaptists. Joking that Hooper's reference to Christ's nakedness on the cross is as insignificant as the clothing King Herod put Christ in and "a jolly argument" for the Adamites, Ridley does not dispute Hooper's main typological argument, but neither does he accept that vestments are necessarily or exclusively identified with Israel and the Roman church. On Hooper's point about the priesthood of all believers, Ridley says it does not follow from this doctrine that all Christians must wear the same clothes.

2) An indifferent thing must be left to individual discretion; if required, it is no longer indifferent.

For Ridley, on matters of indifference, one must defer conscience to the authorities of the church, or else "thou showest thyself a disordered person, disobedient, as [a] contemner of lawful authority, and a wounder of thy weak brother his conscience." For him, the debate was finally about legitimate authority, not the merits and demerits of vestments themselves. He contended that it is only accidental that the compulsory ceases to be indifferent; the degeneration of a practice into non-indifference can be corrected without throwing out the practice. Things are not, "because they have been abused, to be taken away, but to be reformed and amended, and so kept still."

3) An indifferent thing's usefulness must be demonstrated and not introduced arbitrarily.

For this point, Hooper cites 1 Corinthians 14 and 2 Corinthians 13. As it contradicts the first point above, Primus contends that Hooper must now refer to indifferent things in the church and earlier meant indifferent things in general, in the abstract. Regardless, the apparent contradiction was seized by Ridley and undoubtedly hurt Hooper's case with the council.

4) Indifferent things must be introduced into the church with apostolic and evangelical lenity, not violent tyranny.

In making such an inflammatory, risky statement (he later may have called his opponents "papists" in a part of his argument that is lost), Hooper may not have been suggesting England was tyrannical but that Rome was—and that England could become like Rome. Ridley warned Hooper of the implications of an attack on English ecclesiastical and civil authority and of the consequences of radical individual liberties, while also reminding him that it was Parliament that established the "Book of Common Prayer in the church of England".

In closing, Hooper asks that the dispute be resolved by church authorities without looking to civil authorities for support—although the monarch was the head of both the church and the state. This hint of a plea for a separation of church and state would later be elaborated by Thomas Cartwright, but for Hooper, although the word of God was the highest authority, the state could still impose upon men's consciences (such as requiring them not to be Roman Catholic) when it had a biblical warrant. Moreover, Hooper himself addressed the civil magistrates, suggesting that the clergy supporting vestments were a threat to the state, and he declared his willingness to be martyred for his cause. Ridley, by contrast, responds with humour, calling this "a magnifical promise set forth with a stout style". He invites Hooper to agree that vestments are indifferent, not to condemn them as sinful, and then he will ordain him even if he wears street clothes to the ceremony.

=== Outcome of the controversy ===
The weaknesses in Hooper's argument, Ridley's laconic and temperate rejoinder, and Ridley's offer of a compromise no doubt turned the council against Hooper's inflexible convictions when he did not accept it. Heinrich Bullinger, Pietro Martire Vermigli, and Martin Bucer, while agreeing with Hooper's views, ceased to support him for the pragmatic sake of unity and slower reform. Only Jan Laski remained a constant ally. Some time in mid-December 1550, Hooper was put under house arrest, during which time he wrote and published A godly Confession and protestation of the Christian faith. Because of this publication, his persistent nonconformism, and violations of the terms of his house arrest, Hooper was placed in Thomas Cranmer's custody at Lambeth Palace for two weeks by the Privy Council on 13 January 1551. Hooper was then sent to Fleet Prison by the council, who made that decision on 27 January. On 15 February, Hooper submitted to consecration in vestments in a letter to Cranmer. He was consecrated Bishop of Gloucester on 8 March 1551, and shortly thereafter, preached before the king in vestments.

== Downfall (1553–5) ==
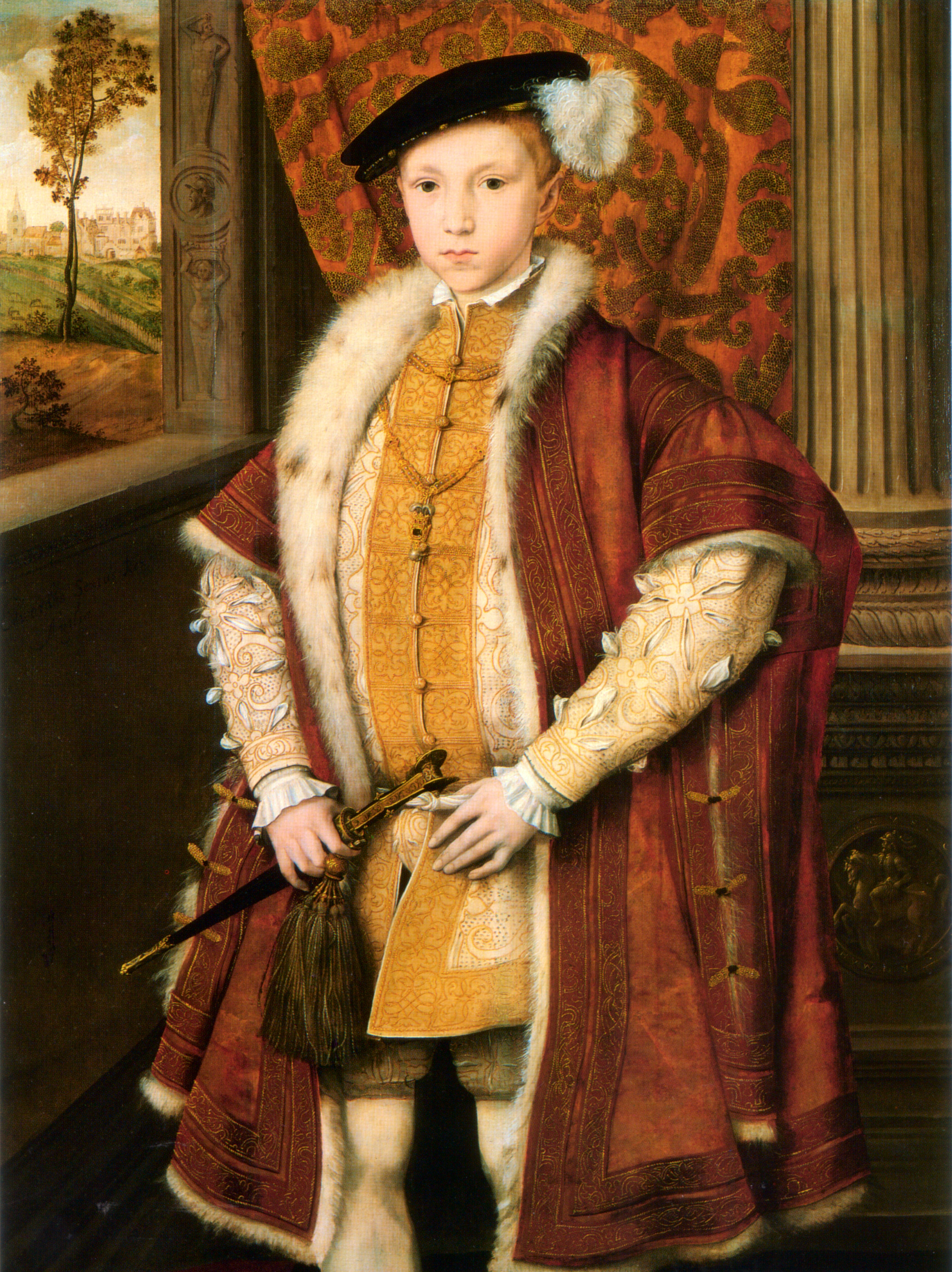
The death of Edward VI, here as Prince of Wales, brought about Ridley's downfall.

On 2 February 1553 Cranmer was ordered to appoint John Knox, a Scot, as vicar of All Hallows, Bread Street in London, placing him under the authority of Ridley. Knox returned to London in order to deliver a sermon before the king and the court during Lent, after which he refused to take his assigned post. That same year, Ridley petitioned Edward VI to give some of his empty palaces over to the City of London (governed by the City of London Corporation) to house homeless women and children. The subsequent royal charter of 1553 (26 June, 7 Edw. VI) created three institutions Christ's Hospital, St Thomas' Hospital and the Bridewell Hospital. The latter subsequently changing its name to King Edward's School, Witley.

Edward VI became seriously ill from tuberculosis and in mid-June the councillors were told that he did not have long to live. They set to work to convince several judges to put on the throne Lady Jane Grey, Edward's cousin, instead of Mary, daughter of Henry VIII and Catherine of Aragon and a Roman Catholic. On 17 June 1553 the king made his will noting Jane would succeed him, contravening the Third Succession Act.

Ridley signed the letters patent giving the English throne to Lady Jane Grey. On 9 July 1553 he preached a sermon at St Paul's cross in which he affirmed that the princesses Mary and Elizabeth were bastards. By mid-July, there were serious provincial revolts in Mary's favour and support for Jane in the council fell. As Mary was proclaimed queen, Ridley, Jane's father, the Duke of Suffolk and others were imprisoned. Ridley was sent to the Tower of London.

Through February 1554 Jane and her leading supporters were executed. After that, there was time to deal with the religious leaders of the English Reformation and so on 8 March 1554 the Privy Council ordered Cranmer, Ridley, and Hugh Latimer to be transferred to Bocardo prison in Oxford to await trial for heresy. The trial of Latimer and Ridley started shortly after Cranmer's with John Jewel acting as notary to Ridley. Their verdicts came almost immediately: they were to be burned at the stake.

== Death and legacy ==
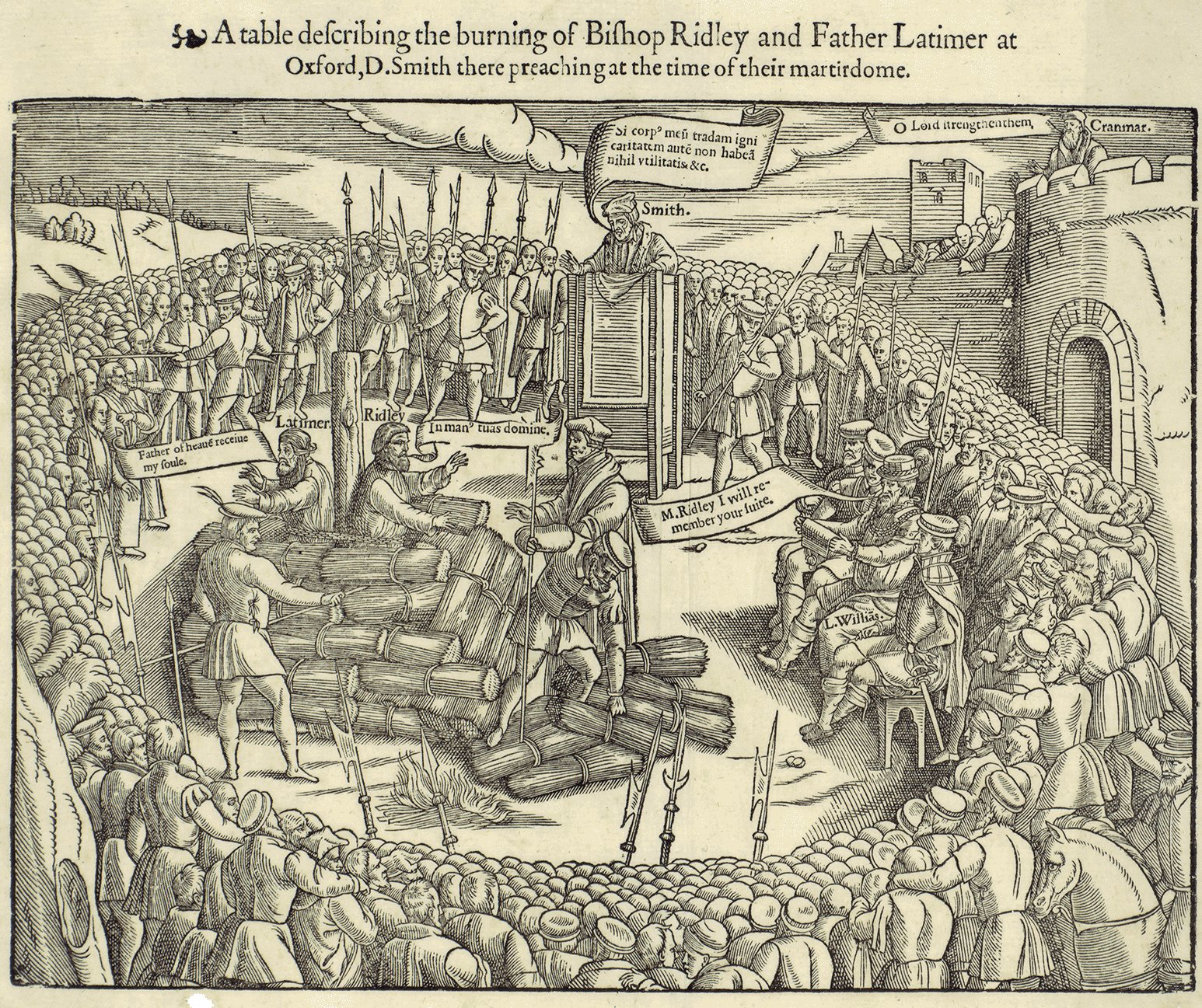
Ridley being burned at the stake, together with Hugh Latimer. From John Foxe's Book of Martyrs.

The sentence was carried out on 16 October 1555 in Oxford. Cranmer was taken to a tower to watch the proceedings. Ridley burned extremely slowly and suffered a great deal: his brother-in-law had put more tinder on the pyre in order to speed his death, but this only caused his lower parts to burn. Latimer is supposed to have said to Ridley, "Be of good comfort, and play the man, Master Ridley; we shall this day light such a candle, by God's grace, in England, as I trust shall never be put out." This was quoted in Foxe's Book of Martyrs.

A metal cross in a cobbled patch of road in Broad Street, Oxford, marks the site. Eventually Ridley and Latimer were seen as martyrs for their support of a Church of England independent from the Roman Catholic Church. Along with Thomas Cranmer, they are known as the Oxford Martyrs.

In the Victorian era, his death was commemorated by the Martyrs' Memorial, located not far from the site of his execution. As well as being a monument to the English Reformation and the doctrines of the Protestant and Reformed doctrines, the memorial is a landmark of the 19th century, a monument stoutly resisted by John Keble, John Henry Newman and others of the Tractarian Movement and Oxford Movement. Profoundly alarmed at the Romewardizing intrusions and efforts at realignment that the movement was attempting to bring into the Church of England, Protestant and Reformed Anglican clergymen raised the funds for erecting the monument, with its highly anti-Roman Catholic inscription, a memorial to over three hundred years of history and reformation. As a result, the monument was built 300 years after the events it commemorates.

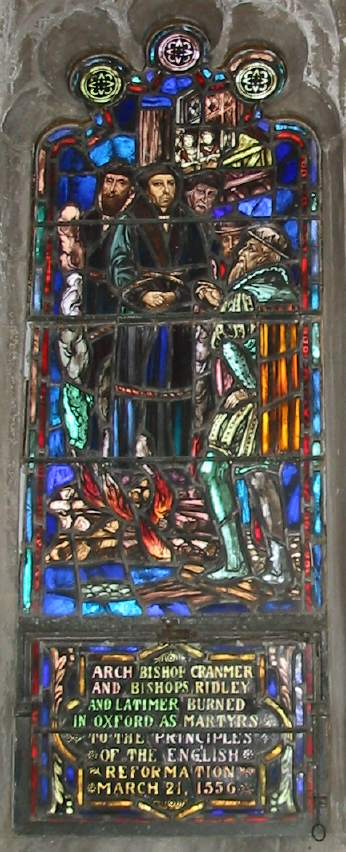
Stained glass window depicting Cranmer, Ridley, and Latimer, the Oxford Martyrs

In 1881, Ridley Hall in Cambridge, England, was founded in his memory for the training of Anglican priests. Ridley College, a private university-preparatory school located in St. Catharines, Ontario, Canada, was founded in his honour in 1889. Also named after him is Ridley College (Melbourne), an evangelical Anglican theological college in Australia, founded in 1910. There is a Church of England church dedicated to him in Welling, southeast London. The words spoken to Ridley by Latimer at their execution are used. Ridley and Latimer are remembered with a commemoration in the calendar of saints in some parts of the Anglican Communion on 16 October.

== See also ==
- Saints in Anglicanism
- Marian Farquharson (descendant)

== Notes ==
Academic offices
Preceded by George Folbury	Master of Pembroke College, Cambridge; 1540–1555	Succeeded by John Young
Church of England titles
Preceded by Henry Holbeach	Bishop of Rochester; 1547–1550	Succeeded by John Ponet
Preceded by Edmund Bonner, Bishop of London	Bishop of London and Westminster; 1550–1553	Succeeded by Edmund Bonner, Bishop of London
