= St Michael at the North Gate =

Church in Oxford, England

Coordinates: 51°45′13″N 1°15′30″W

- St Michael at the North Gate, Oxford
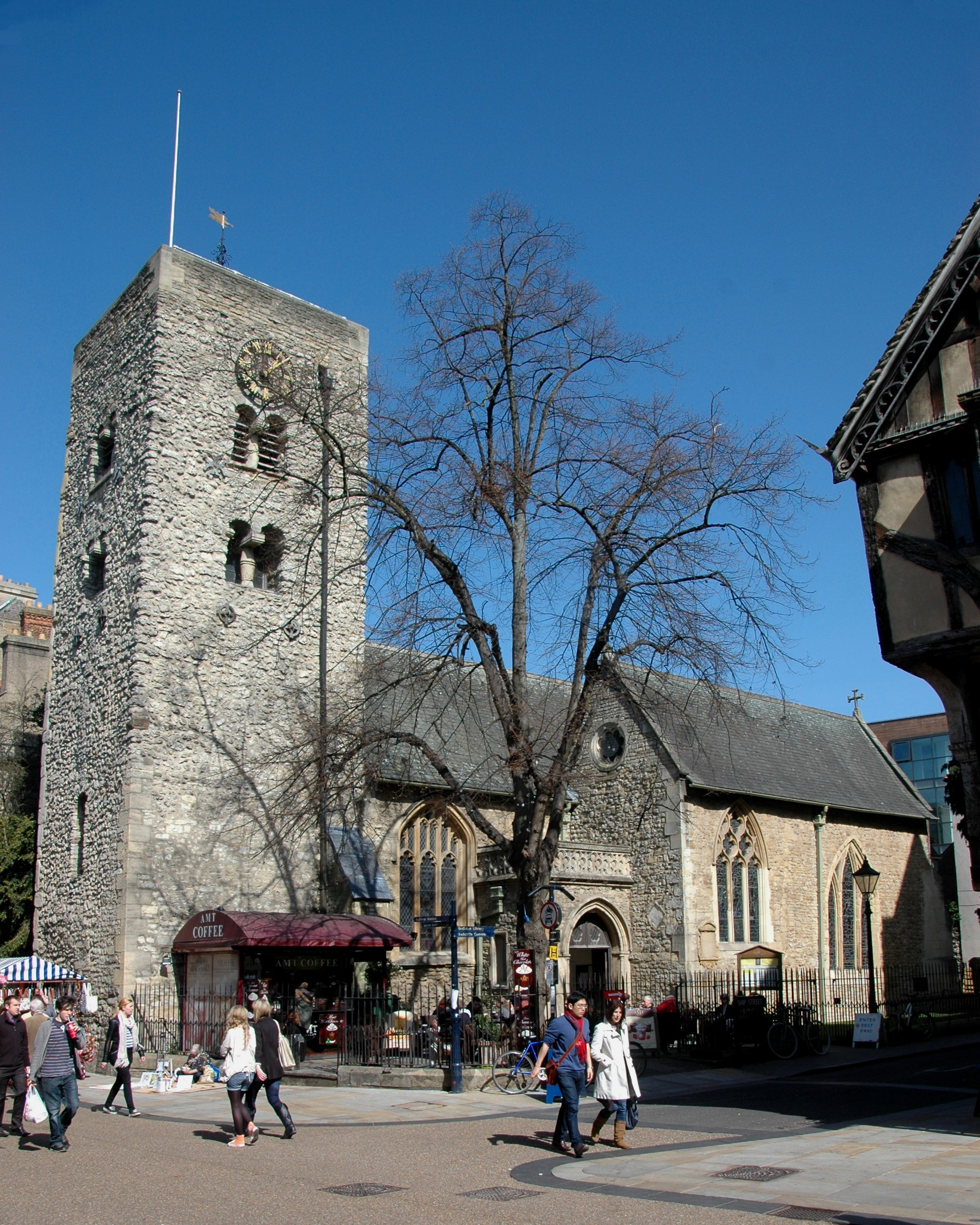
- The Saxon tower of St Michael at the North Gate
- St Michael at the North Gate
- OS grid reference: SP 51289 06375
- Location: Cornmarket Street, Oxford
- Country: England
- Denomination: Church of England
- Website: www.smng.org.uk

History
- Dedication: St Michael

Architecture
- Style: Saxon
- Years built: 1000–1050; 976 years ago

Administration
- Diocese: Oxford

Clergy
- Vicar: Anthony Buckley

St Michael at the North Gate is a church in Cornmarket Street, at the junction with Ship Street, in central Oxford, England. The name derives from the church's location on the site of the north gate of Oxford when it was surrounded by the Oxford city wall.

Since 1971, it has served as the ceremonial City Church of Oxford, and has joined the parishes of the two earlier City Churches with its own.

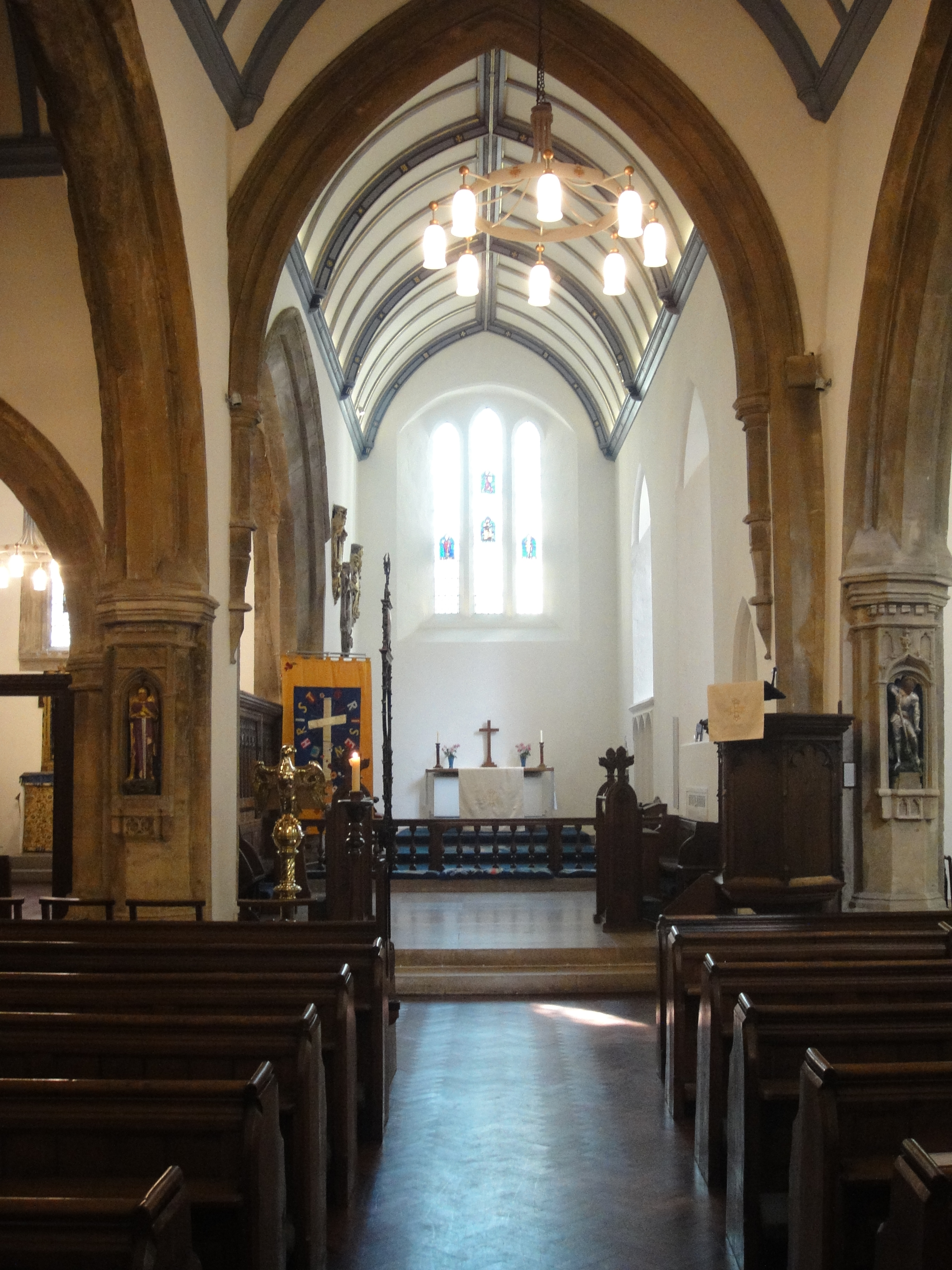
Interior of the church

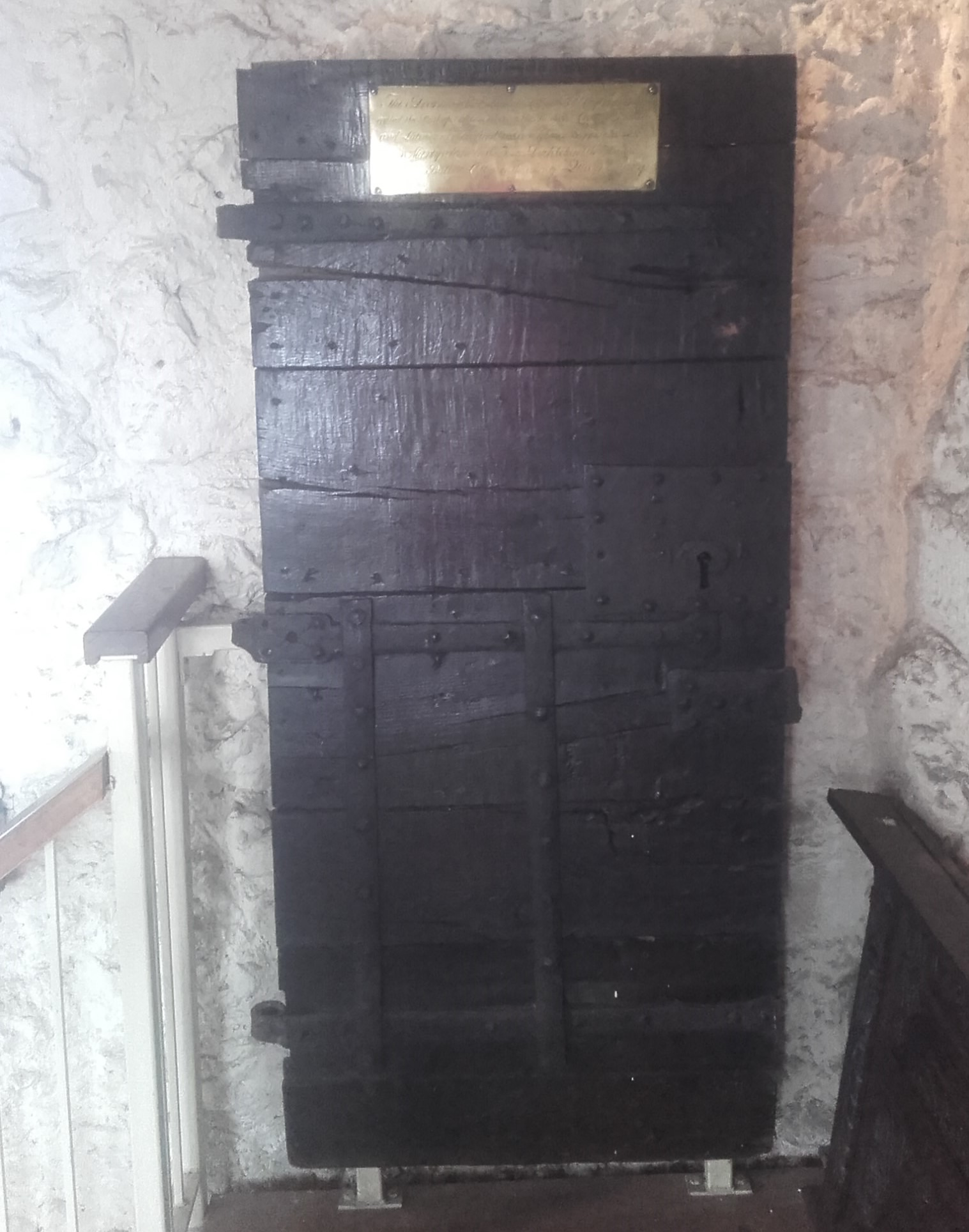
The cell door from the Bocardo Prison where Thomas Cranmer was held before his execution in 1556, now preserved in the Saxon bell tower of St Michael's Church.

The entire tower is accessible to the public, including the top which provides a view of the city as well as an original clockwork mechanism.

== History ==
Originally built around 1000–1050, with the tower from 1040 still in existence, the church claims to be Oxford's oldest building. It was constructed of Coral Rag. The church tower is Anglo-Saxon. The architect John Plowman rebuilt the north aisle and transept in 1833.

The Oxford Martyrs were imprisoned in the Bocardo Prison by the church before they were burnt at the stake in what is now Broad Street nearby, then immediately outside the city walls, in 1555 and 1556. Their cell door can be seen on display in the church's tower.

St Michael at the North Gate is the current City Church of Oxford, which is the church where the Mayor and Corporation of Oxford are expected to worship. The title was originally held by St Martin's Church at Carfax, and then by All Saints' Church in the High Street after St Martin's Church was demolished (except for its tower) in 1896. City Church status passed to St Michael's when All Saints' Church was declared redundant in 1971 and was subsequently converted into the library of Lincoln College. The parishes of St Martin's and All Saints are now amalgamated with St Michael's.

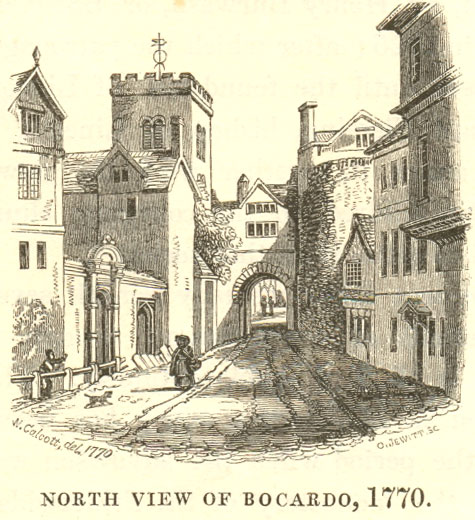
The church and former North Gate, with the Bocardo over the gate

A ceremony, called "beating the bounds", is held each year on Ascension Day to mark out the boundary of the parish. Led by the vicar, parishioners process around the old boundary stones of the parish; the vicar places a cross in chalk on each, and then church wardens hit the stones with wands made of willow, shouting "Mark, mark, mark!" as they do so.

According to Margaret Murray (writing 1934), there was a sheela na gig figure at St Michael at the North Gate which had a tradition of being shown to brides on their wedding day.

== People ==
William Morris and Jane Burden (who lived off Holywell Street nearby) were married here on 25 April 1859. The marriage certificate is on view in the Saxon tower. John Wesley's pulpit is also on view here.

== See also ==
- Anglo-Saxon architecture
- St Mary Magdalen, Oxford, to the north
- Bocardo Prison
