= Jacob Barnet affair =

1612 scandal at the University of Oxford, England

The Jacob Barnet affair occurred in 1612 when a Jewish teacher by the name of Jacob Barnet was arrested and imprisoned by officials of the University of Oxford for changing his mind about being baptised.

== Background ==
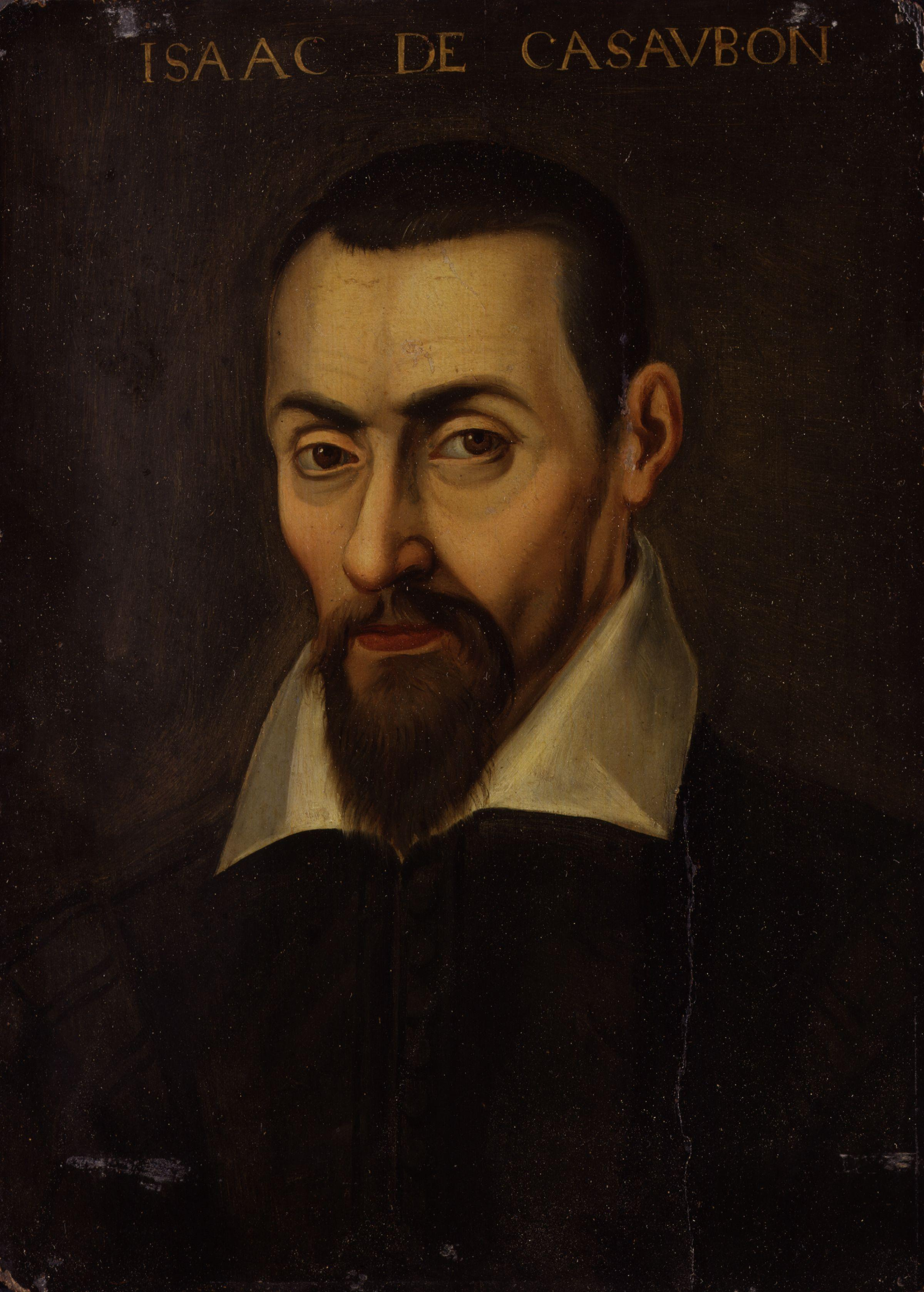
Isaac Casaubon, by unknown artist

Throughout the Middle Ages and up until the 1850s the University of Oxford required all students and the faculty staff to be Christians; following the English Reformation, they were required to be members of the established church (the Church of England). In addition, Edward I's ban on Jews living in England remained in force until Cromwell overturned it. Nevertheless, a few visiting Jewish Hebrew teachers taught students at the university privately, or worked in the Bodleian Library on Hebrew manuscripts.

In 1609, the French Huguenot scholar Isaac Casaubon invited Jacob Barnet, an Italian Jew, to his home in Drury Lane, London. During their time together, they discussed Jewish texts on various topics, and Barnet proved to Casaubon that Jesus had been buried in accordance with standard Jewish burial practice rather than (as argued by Cardinal Baronio) in a new way that became the method of Catholic burial. Casaubon thereafter employed Barnet as his secretary, and in 1610 the two of them came to Oxford.

== Oxford ==
Barnet's personal qualities, as well as his erudition, meant that he was liked and respected by scholars at the university. While at Oxford, he decided to be baptised as a Christian, and told Casaubon of his decision; Casaubon told the Vice-Chancellor, who (like other members of the university) was pleased with Barnet's decision. Preparations were made for Barnet to be baptised at a grand service in the University Church of St Mary the Virgin.

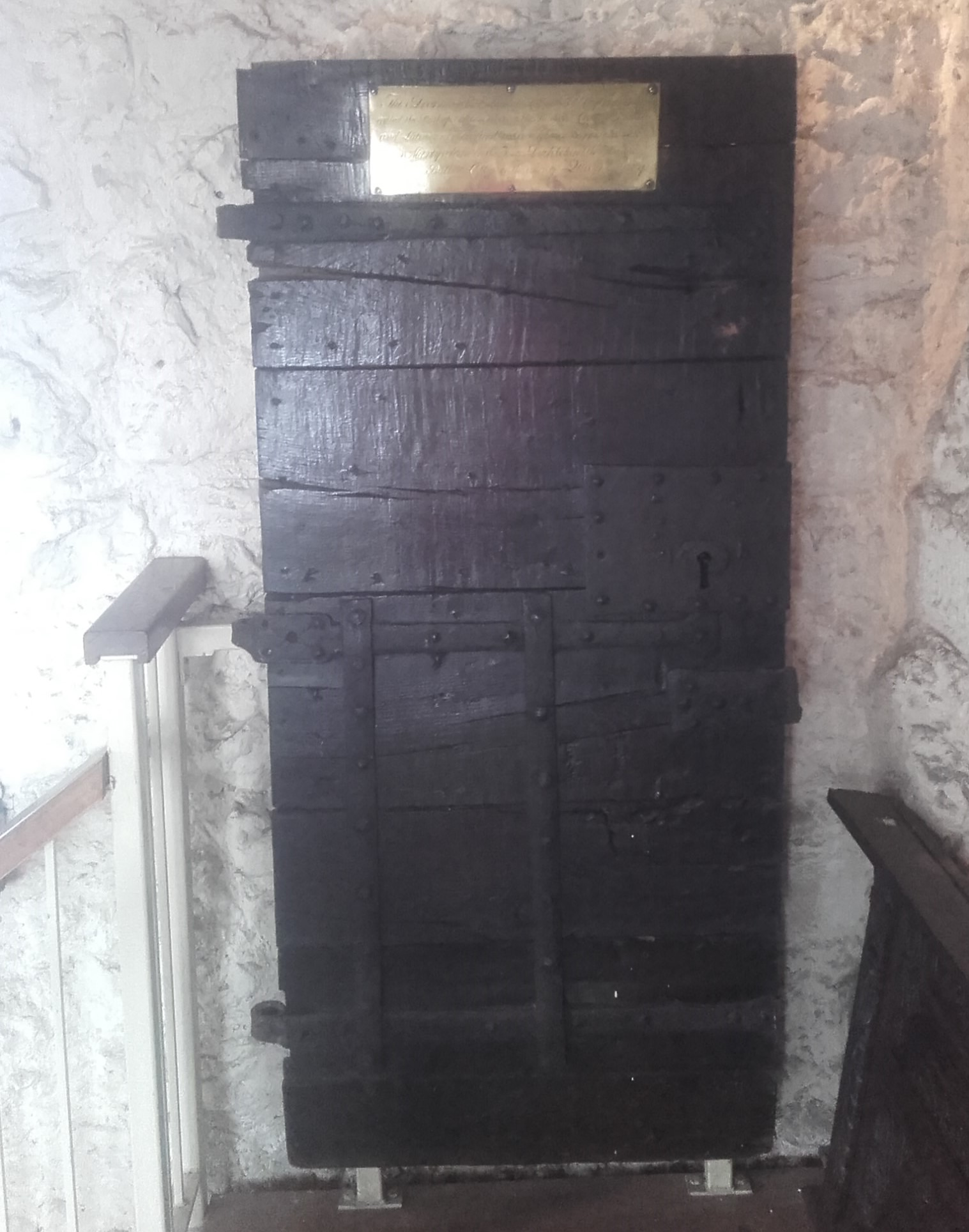
A Bocardo Prison cell door

Barnet, however, did not attend the ceremony, having decided against converting; he left Oxford on foot. According to the 17th-century Oxford antiquarian Anthony Wood, Arthur Lake, the Warden of New College, Oxford, sent pursuers after Barnet on foot and on horseback; Lake was one of the "learned Doctors" of the university whom Wood said had been "deceived" by Barnet's "tricks". Barnet was apprehended and taken back to Oxford, where he refused to be baptised. He was then detained in the unpleasant conditions of the Bocardo Prison. In the meantime, William Twisse, who was to preach at the service, changed his sermon to address Barnet's change of heart, demonstrating (according to Wood) "God's just judgment upon that perverse nation and people, whom he had given up to a reprobate sense even to this very day."

== Aftermath ==
Casaubon was appalled by the treatment of Barnet and considered it a "violation of Christian ethics". He later said that he did not think that changing one's mind on such a matter of religion was a criminal matter. He appealed on Barnet's behalf to King James I, who issued a warrant for his release. Some months after his arrest, he was put on a ship to France and exiled. Later, Barnet was an adviser at the French court on Jewish matters.
