= Oxford Society of Change Ringers =

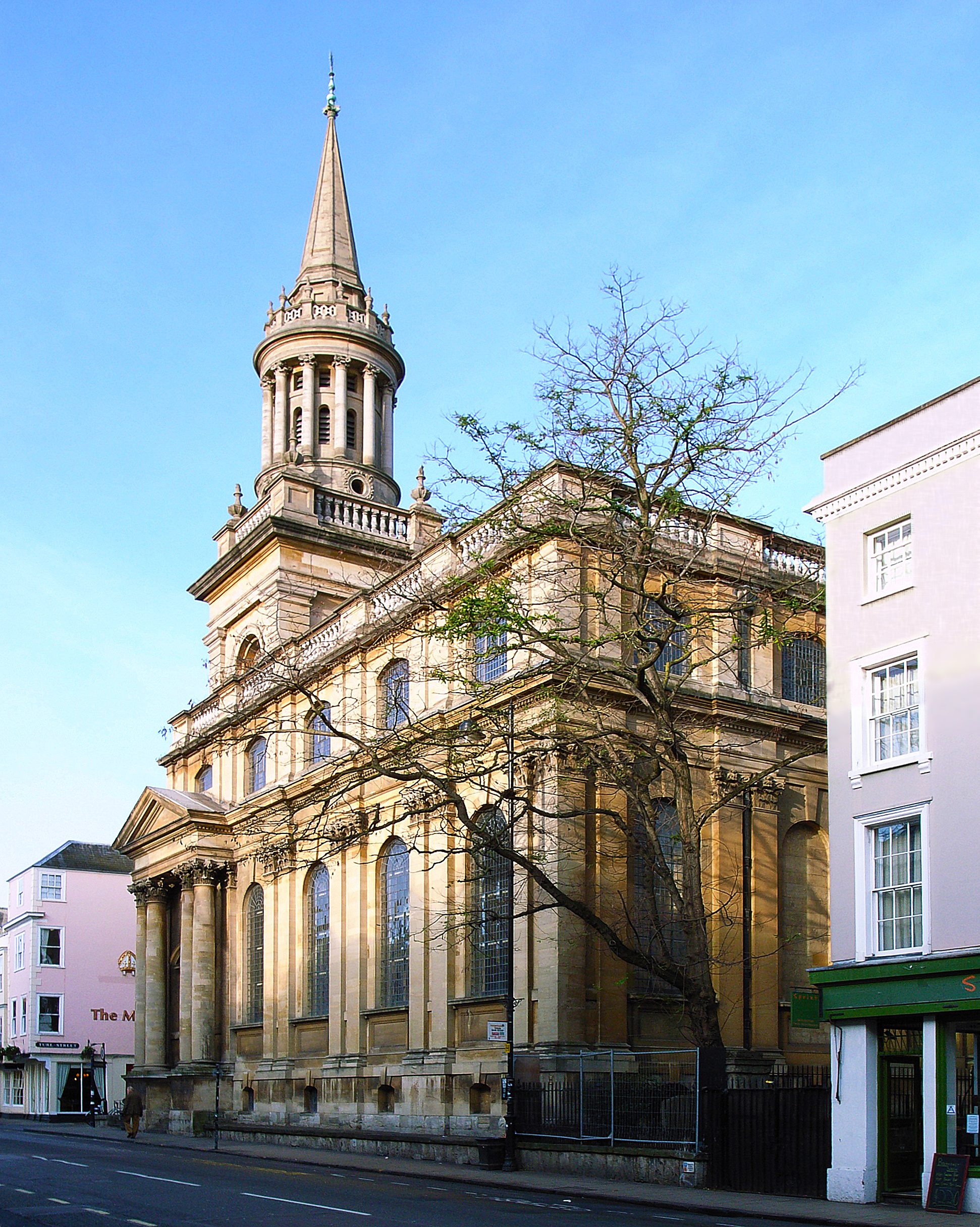
All Saints Church on the High Street, now Lincoln College library, where the Oxford Society of Change Ringers practise.

The Oxford Society of Change Ringers, established in 1734, is a society dedicated to change ringing in Oxford, England. It should not be confused with the Oxford University Society of Change Ringers. The society is based at the Cathedral Church of Christ where its members ring for Sunday services as well as practising there twice a month. Weekly practices are held at Lincoln College, in the former All Saints Church, now the college library, which still has a peal of eight bells.

Other towers at which the Oxford Society rings include:

- Carfax Tower
- Magdalen College
- Merton College
- New College
- University Church of St Mary the Virgin
- Tom Tower, Christ Church (Tom Tower holds the bell of Great Tom, which is swung for special occasions)
