= All Saints' Church, Oxford =

Coordinates: 51°45′09″N 1°15′20″W

All Saints
- All Saints Church
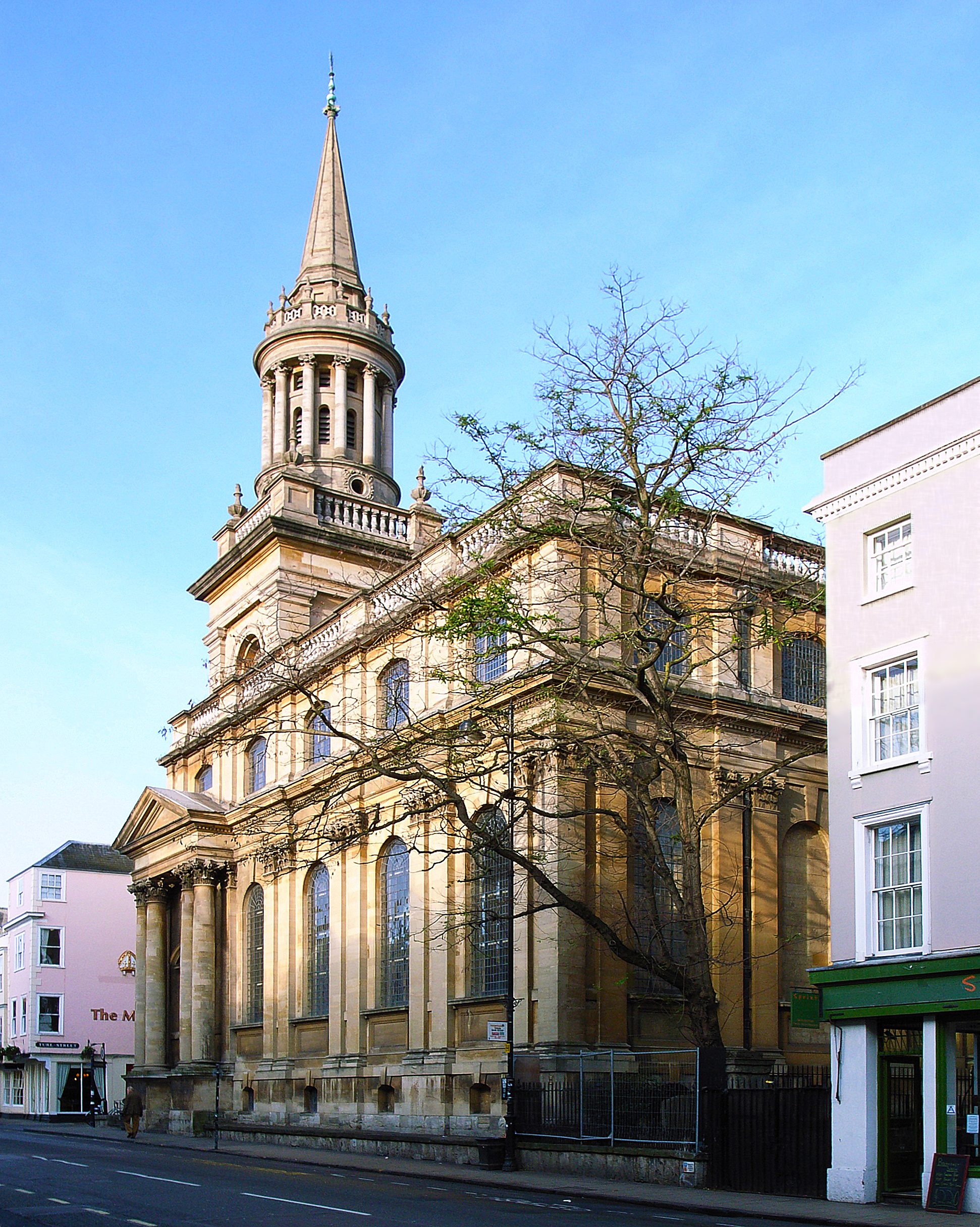
- All Saints Church, now Lincoln College library, viewed from the High Street
- All Saints
- OS grid reference: SP 51480 06232
- Location: Turl Street, Oxford
- Country: England
- Denomination: Anglican
- Website: www.lincoln.ox.ac.uk

Architecture
- Style: English Baroque
- Years built: 1720

Administration
- Diocese: Oxford

All Saints Church is a former church on the north side of the High Street in central Oxford, England, on the corner of Turl Street. It is now the library of Lincoln College. This former church is Grade I listed.

== History ==
The original All Saints Church was founded in 1122 on this site. However, on 8 March 1700, the spire of the church collapsed, destroying most of the building. There was an appeal for funds and the current building, seating 350, was completed in 1720. The building was designed by Henry Aldrich, the Dean of Christ Church. Nicholas Hawksmoor is thought to be responsible for the tower and spire. Four of the original bells survived the collapse. The repairs to the church were very expensive and donations were received from most of the Oxford colleges and also Queen Anne.

In 1896, when St Martin's Church at Carfax was demolished (except for its tower), All Saints became the official City Church, where the Mayor and Corporation were expected to worship. In 1946 a Union Jack which had been draped over the coffins of prisoners of war at Batu Lintang camp, Sarawak, Borneo was placed in the church together with two wooden memorial plaques; they were later moved to Dorchester Abbey in Dorchester on Thames. In 1971, All Saints Church was declared redundant and the City Church moved to St Michael at the North Gate. All Saints was then deconsecrated and offered to Lincoln College, located immediately to the north of the church. Since 1975, after conversion, the building has been Lincoln College's library.

== Library ==
The only major change to the interior of the church during its conversion into a library was the raising of the original floor by over four feet to provide space for the lower reading rooms. The upper reading room is known as the Cohen Room and has an elegant plastered ceiling. The decorations include the shields of the major donors who contributed to the cost of the 18th-century rebuilding. The lower reading room is the science library and the senior library, holding older books. The science section is named after a former Lincoln College Fellow, Howard Florey (1898–1968), instrumental in the development of penicillin, for which he won the Nobel Prize for Physiology or Medicine.

The Library still has a full peal of eight bells, which are regularly rung by the Oxford Society of Change Ringers, founded in 1734. They are also rung for special occasions, such as the election of a new Rector of the College.

== Headington ==
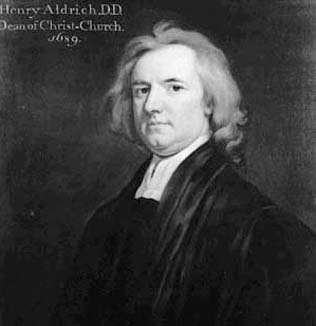
Henry Aldrich, architect of the current church (completed 1720)

There is another All Saints Church in the suburb of Headington to the east of central Oxford, on Lime Walk. It was consecrated in 1910.

== Gallery ==
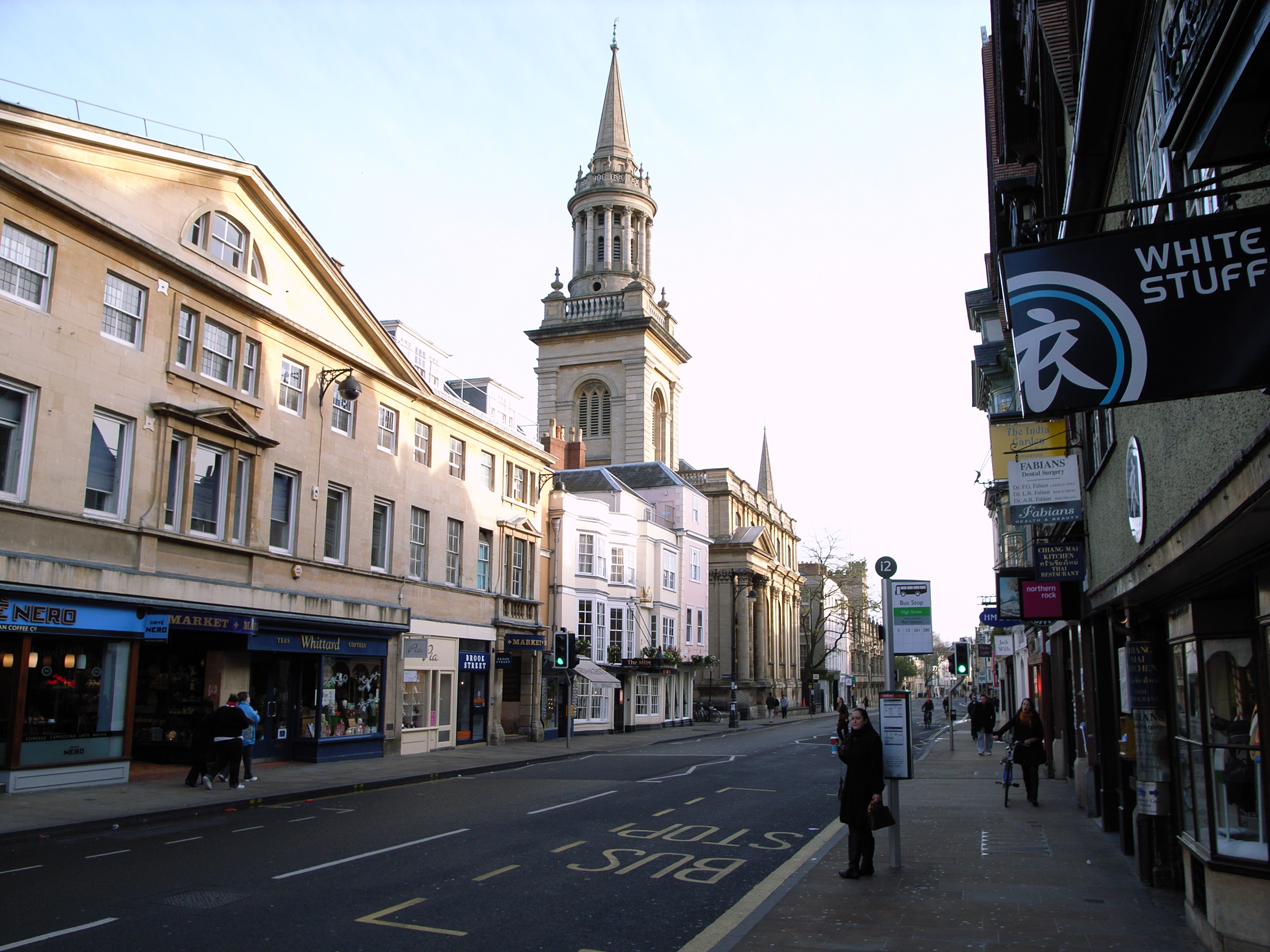
View of All Saints Church from the west along the High Street.

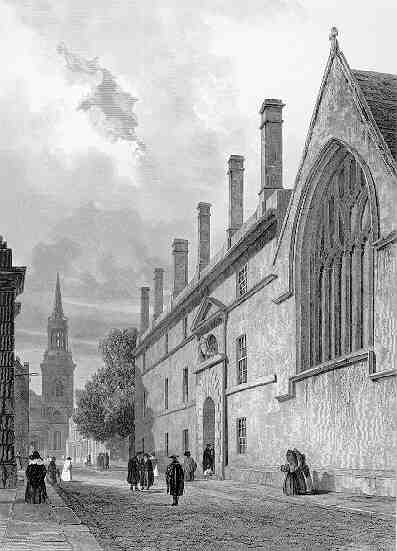
Engraving looking south along Turl Street, with the spire of All Saints Church in the background (1839).

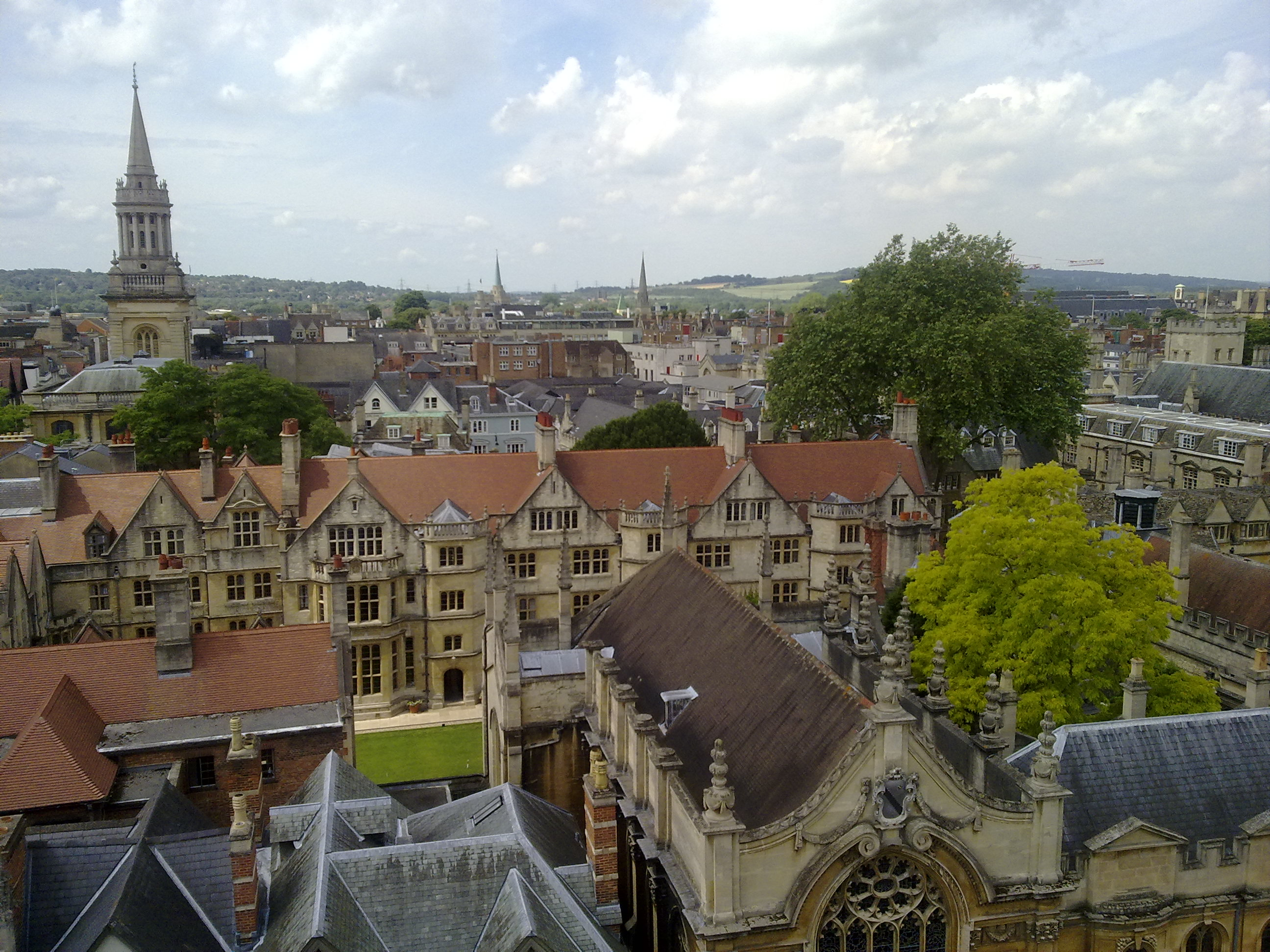
All Saints Church from St Mary's, on the High Street.

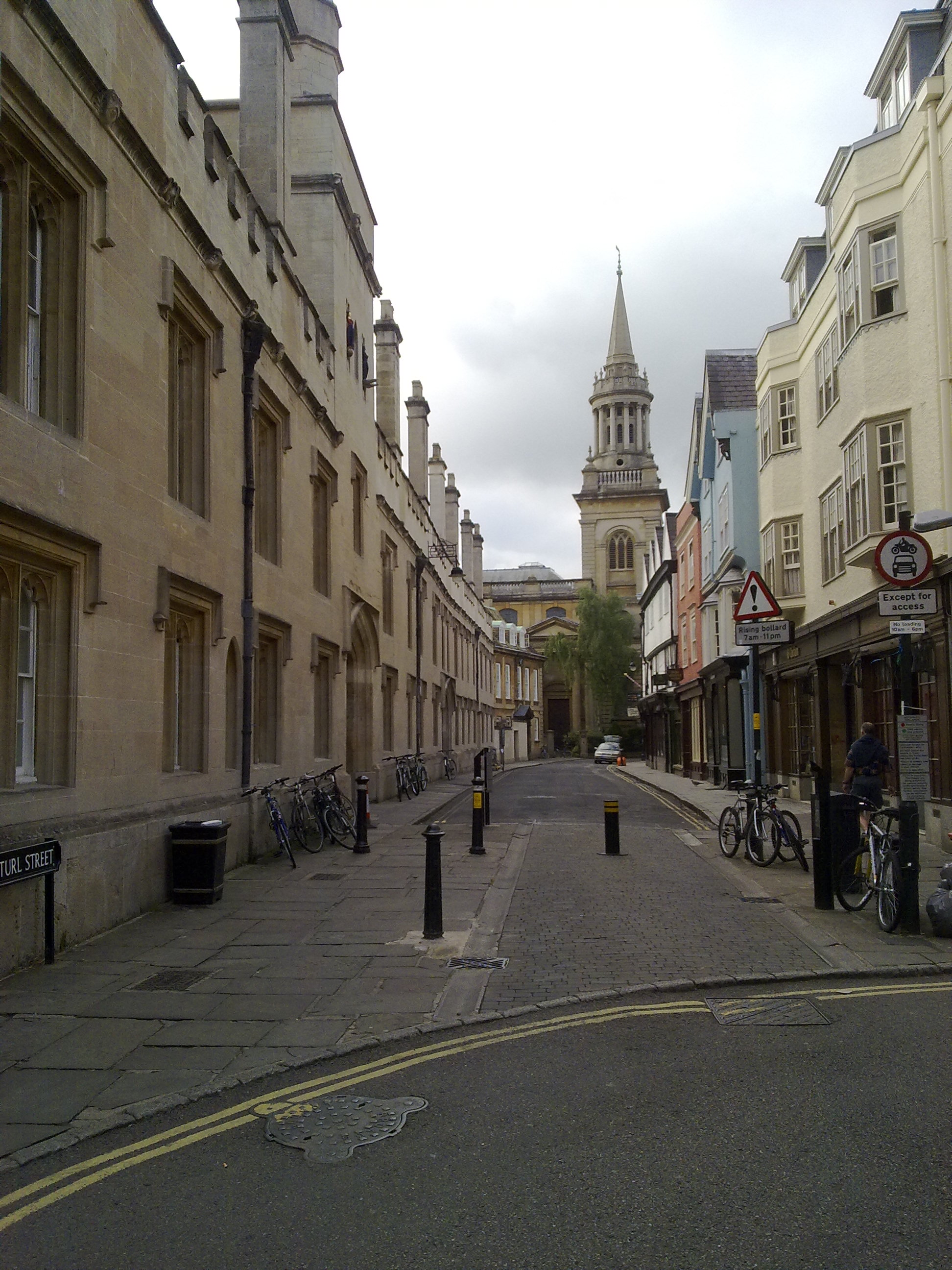
All Saints from Turl Street, looking south.
