= St. Ebbes =

District of central Oxford, England

Coordinates: 51.751°N 1.260°W

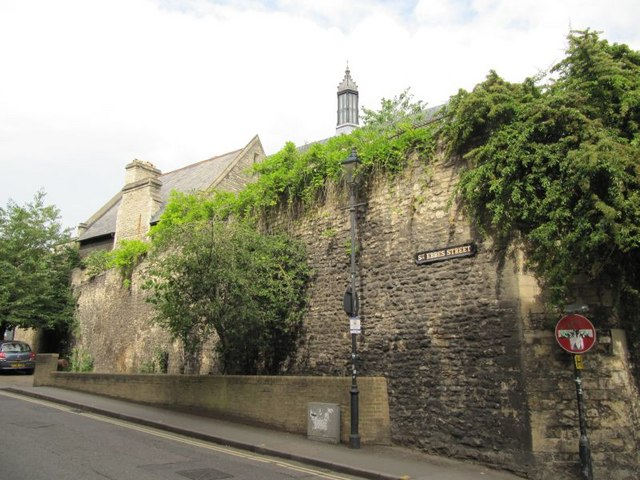
- Wall in St Ebbe's Street, part of Pembroke College, Oxford.

- Location within Oxfordshire
- OS grid reference: SP511060
- Civil parish: unparished
- District: Oxford
- Shire county: Oxfordshire
- Region: South East
- Country: England
- Sovereign state: United Kingdom
- Post town: Oxford
- Postcode district: OX1
- Dialling code: 01865
- Police: Thames Valley
- Fire: Oxfordshire
- Ambulance: South Central
- UK Parliament: Oxford West and Abingdon
- Website: Oxford City Council

St Ebbes is a district of central Oxford, England, southwest of Carfax. St Ebbes Street runs south from the western end of Queen Street.

== Overview ==
The area takes its name from the parish church of St Ebbe's, dedicated to Saint Æbbe the Elder. The name was first recorded in about 1005, when the church and other nearby property was granted to Eynsham Abbey. The parish extended southwards to the River Thames. By 1279 the area was known for property inhabited by the poorer townsfolk, and remained so until the middle of the 20th century.

The southern part of the parish was also known as The Friars. In 1818, a gas works was built on the north bank of the River Thames in St Ebbes to supply the city of Oxford with gas. St Ebbes expanded significantly in the 19th century, and by 1882 there was no room to expand the gas works, and new gasholders had to be built on the south bank of the river. A railway bridge, the Gasworks Bridge, was built across the river to connect the gas works to the Great Western Railway line. The gas works were closed in 1960.

The area was redeveloped between the 1950s and the 1980s. A new main road, Thames Street, was built through the area in 1968. Between 1970 and 1972 the Westgate Shopping Centre was built in St Ebbes, and much of the rest of the area became car parks. Only a few residential properties remain to the north of Thames Street. There is a small housing estate between Thames Street and the river, known as St Ebbes by the River.

St Ebbe's Street runs south from Queen Street past Pembroke Street (on the right), to Brewer Street (on the right). There the street becomes "Littlegate".

St Ebbe's Church of England parish church in Pennyfarthing Place, on the corner with St Ebbe's Street, now serves a conservative evangelical congregation. St Ebbe's Church of England Primary School is south of the river, outside the parish.

== Notable people ==
- The Victorian photographer Henry Taunt was born at Penson's Gardens, St Ebbes, on 14 June 1842.

== See also ==
- Castle Street, Oxford
- Paradise Street, Oxford

== Sources and further reading ==
- Eleanor Chance; Christina Colvin; Janet Cooper; C.J. Day; T.G. Hassall; Nesta Selwyn (1979). Crossley, Alan; Elrington, C.R. (eds.). Victoria County History: A History of the County of Oxford, Volume 4.
- Curl, James Stevens (1977). The Erosion of Oxford. Oxford Illustrated Press Ltd. pp. 107–132. ISBN 0-902280-40-6.
- Hibbert, C, ed. (1988). Encyclopaedia of Oxford. London: Macmillan Publishers. ISBN 0-333-39917-X.
- Sherwood, Jennifer; Pevsner, Nikolaus (1974). The Buildings of England: Oxfordshire. Harmondsworth: Penguin Books. pp. 292, 326–329. ISBN 0-14-071045-0.
