= Paradise Street, Oxford =

Street in central Oxford, England

Coordinates: 51.7511°N 1.2636°W

Paradise Street is a historical street in central Oxford, England. It is in the St Ebbe's area of Oxford, to the southwest of Oxford Castle.

The street runs from Paradise Square to Quaking Bridge, across Castle Mill Stream. It continues to the east into Castle Street.

Historically, both Greyfriars and Blackfriars lived here. The Jolly Farmers public house, a tavern originating in 1592, and in continual use ever since, sits on the corner of Paradise Street and Square. It has been the main Oxford LGBTQ+ venue since 1982. On the south side of the street is a late 17th-century house, Greyfriars, conserved in 1985. The two Greyfriars buildings on this street are now luxury holiday rentals called Greyfriars Hideaway.

Swan Bridge is a Grade II listed bridge over the Castle Mill Stream forming part of Paradise Street. The bridge was Grade II listed in 1972.

The Swan's Nest Brewery, later the Swan Brewery, was established by the early 18th century in Paradise Street. In 1795, it was acquired by William Hall. The brewery became known as Hall's Oxford Brewery, which acquired other local breweries. Hall's Brewery was acquired by Samuel Allsopp & Sons in 1926, after which it ceased brewing in Oxford.

In 1885, Castle Terrace was built by F. J. Codd in the street. This became Simon House but has since been demolished and is now under transformation to become apartments. At the top end of the street is Westgate Oxford, the transformed shopping centre that is now home to many luxury brands, coffee shops, gyms, cinema, delis and restaurants.

== See also ==
- Westgate Shopping Centre, Oxford

== Gallery ==
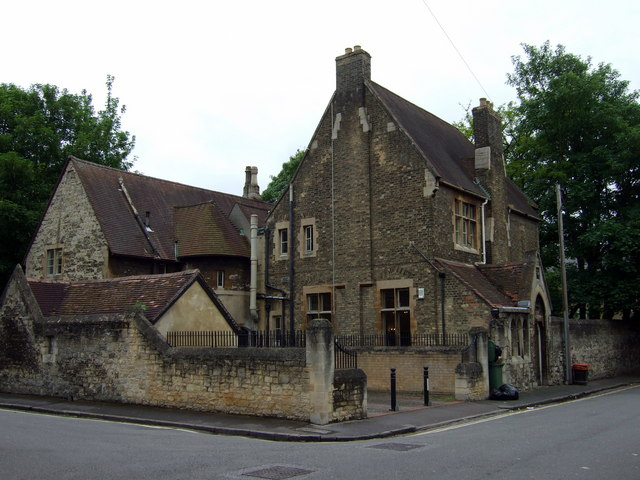
The former St Ebbe's Rectory, designed by G. E. Street in 1852, off Paradise Street

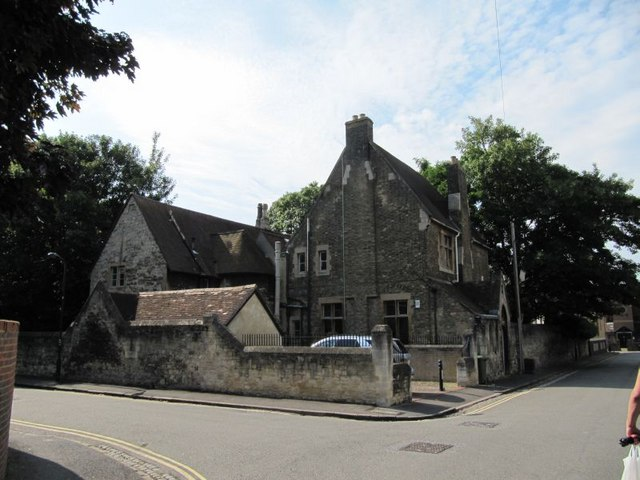
Another view of the St Ebbe's Rectory

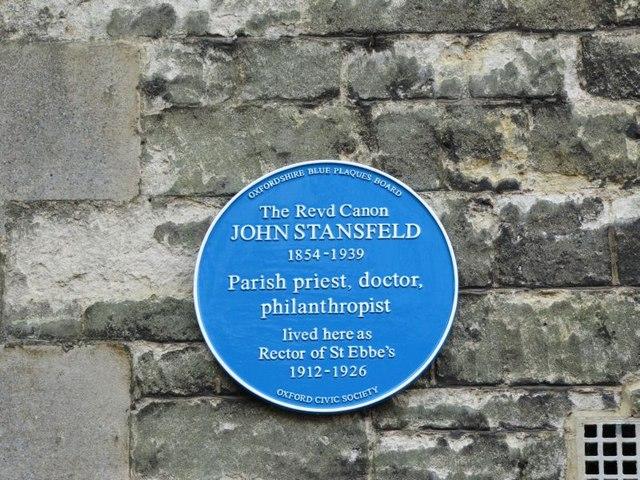
.Blue plaque for John Stansfeld (1854–1939), Rector of St Ebbe's Church 1912–26, on the wall of the former St Ebbe's Rectory

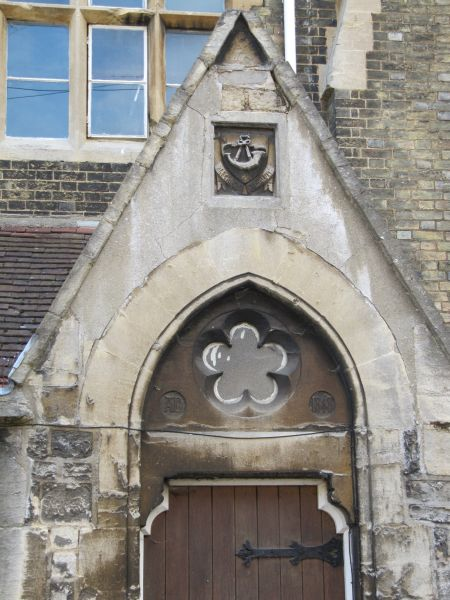
Detail of the porch on the former school on Paradise Street

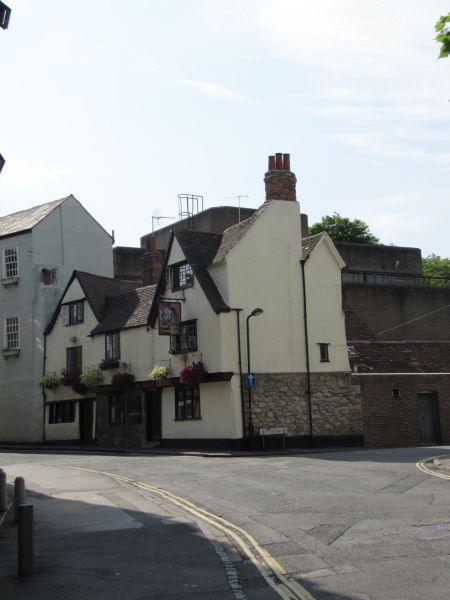
The Jolly Farmer public house on Paradise Street
