= Castle Street, Oxford =

Street in Oxford, England

Coordinates: 51.7512°N 1.2613°W

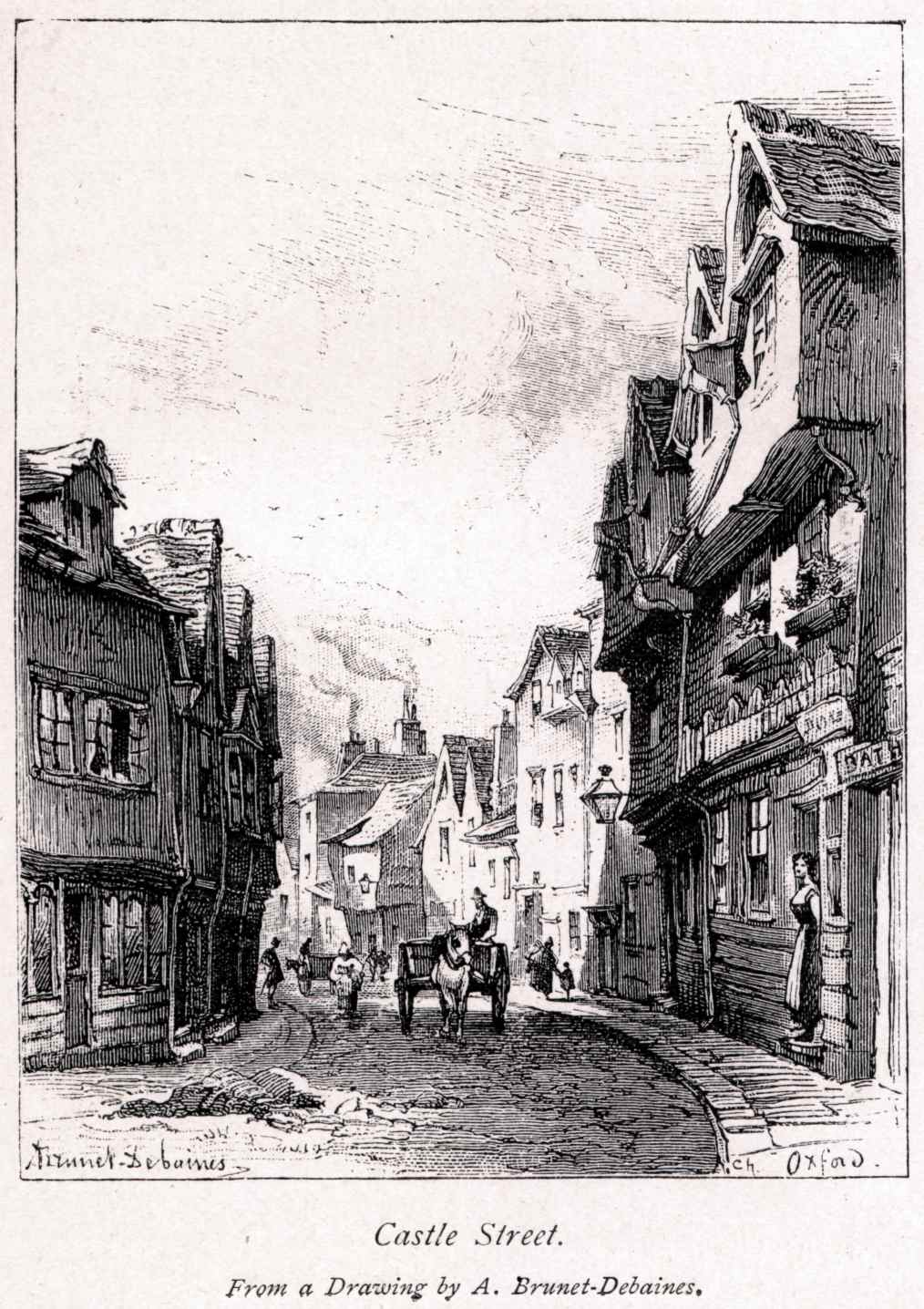
19th-century view of Castle Street in Oxford

Castle Street is a historic street in Oxford, England. It is named after Oxford Castle which is close by to the west and is located in the St Ebbe's area of southwest central Oxford.

The main entrance of Oxford Castle, dating from 1071, was on Castle Street.

"Castell Streate" can be found on a map of 1578 by Ralph Agas.

In 1885, Castle Terrace was built by F. J. Codd in the adjoining Paradise Street. This became Simon House, run by the Cyreneans.

The original street was relatively narrow. Castle Street was realigned and widened due to the demolition of old buildings and the creation of the Westgate Centre during 1968–73. The remains of Oxford Castle and Oxford Prison lie between Castle Street and New Road. Some of the remaining historic buildings on Castle Street are Grade II listed, but there has been an issue of maintaining them.

To the north, there is a junction with New Road and Queen Street. The Westgate Shopping Centre is to the east at the northern end of the street.

== Gallery ==
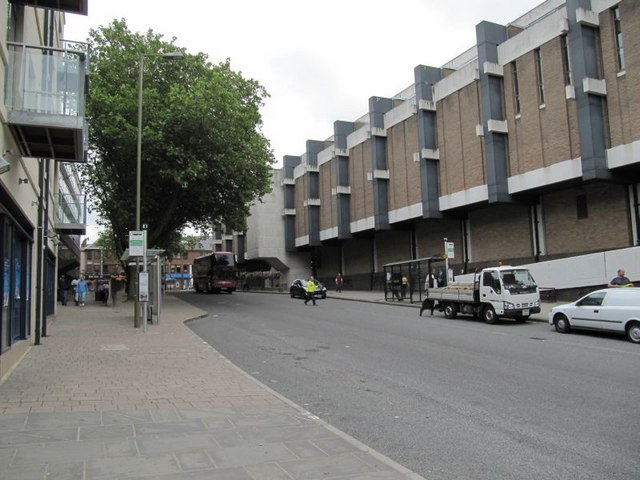
View up Castle Street past Westgate Shopping Centre

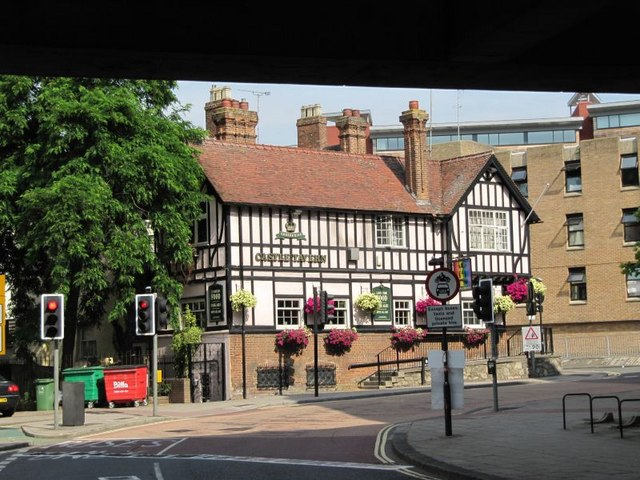
The Castle Tavern on Castle Street
