= Shoe Lane =

Shoe Lane may refer to:

- Shoe Lane, a passage off Fleet Street, in the City of London, mentioned in The Diary of Samuel Pepys (21 December 1663) and by Charles Dickens in "Sketches by Boz, Omnibuses"
- Shoe Lane, an alley leading from New Inn Hall Street, Oxford, to the Clarendon Shopping Centre
