= Bonn Square =

Square in central Oxford, England

Coordinates: 51.7517°N 1.2600°W

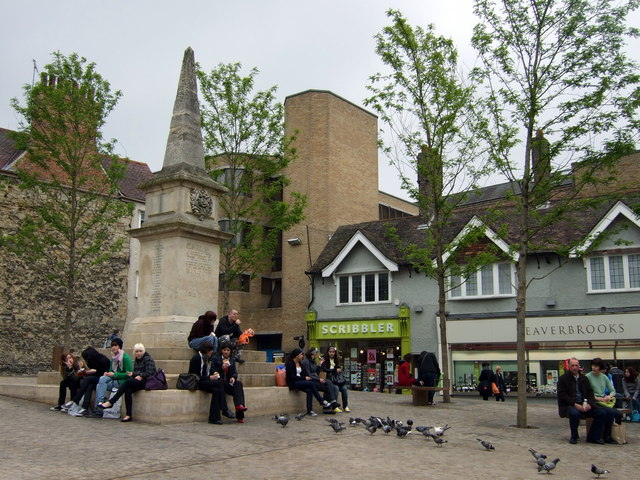
Bonn Square and Tirah Memorial

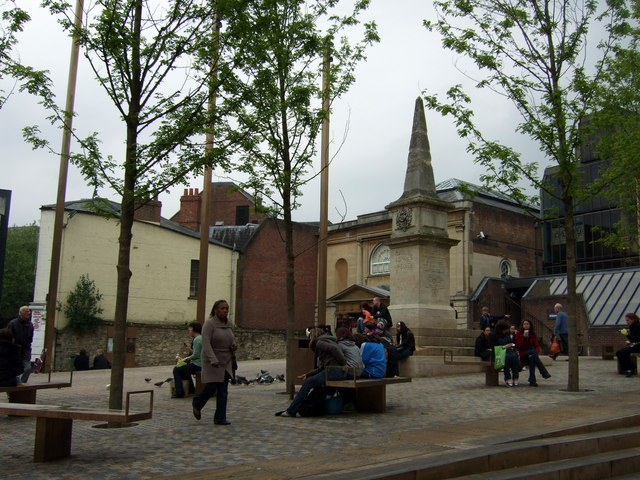
Alternative view of Bonn Square with the New Road Baptist Church in the background

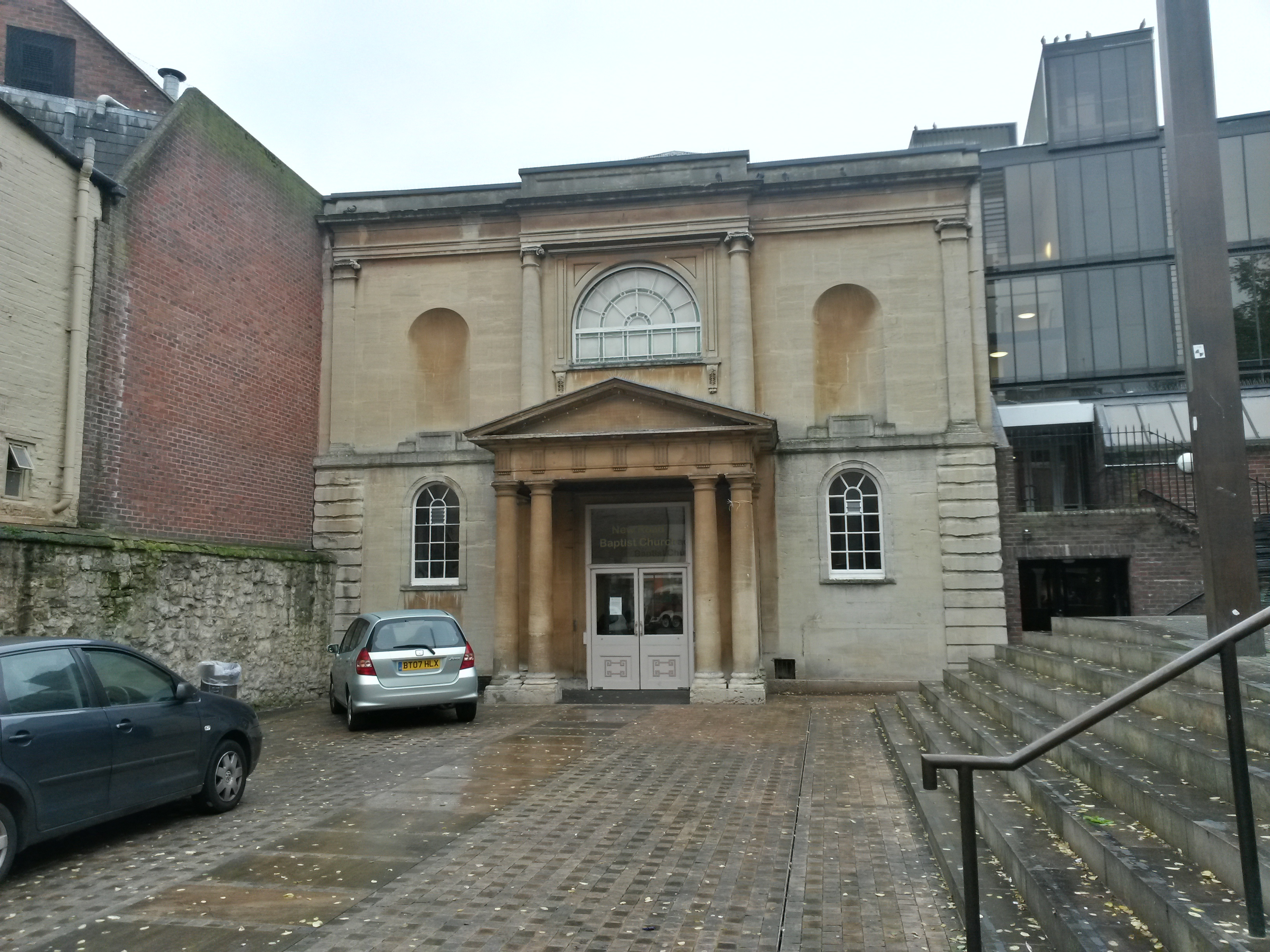
The New Road Baptist Church

Bonn Square in Oxford, England, is named after the German city of Bonn with which Oxford is twinned. It is close to the original west gate of the city of Oxford, where the Westgate Shopping Centre is now located. To the east is Queen Street, a shopping street. New Inn Hall Street leads north from near here. Oxford Castle and the old Oxford Prison are also nearby, now converted into a hotel and restaurants.

== History ==
For over 700 years, from the 12th century until 1870, the area was the graveyard of St Peter-le-Bailey Church. Although no records exist for the first 400 years of the graveyard's existence, parish records for the period from 1585 to 1870 list around 6,800 burials. The church stood at the front of the square, overlapping on to the present Queen Street. In 1874 the church was rebuilt further up the road (now St Peter's College chapel), and the old church was demolished to make way for a road widening scheme. From 1874 to 2007 the churchyard was a memorial garden, and the Tirah Memorial, the first war memorial erected in Oxford, was appropriately placed there in 1900. The area was named Bonn Square in 1974. The new paved Bonn Square was opened on 28 November 2008.

== Modern developments ==
The Square has been a site favoured by the homeless in Oxford, and major redevelopment commenced in January 2008, although work was initially disrupted by protesters who objected to the felling of a sycamore tree in the square. Meanwhile, protests also erupted about development work proposed as part of the Westgate Shopping Centre, with a Green Party county councillor being arrested during an attempt to stop the felling of London plane trees and eventual demolition of the Westgate multi-storey car park.

The redevelopment in 2008 made it possible to inspect and record a number of gravestones which had been buried since the church of St Peter-le-Bailey on the site was demolished in 1873. During the redevelopment, Oxford Archaeology undertook the archaeological investigations on behalf of Oxford City Council.

In May 2009 a multi-part sculpture by Diana Bell was set in the square "to commemorate sixty years of exchange" between the cities of Bonn and Oxford. Titled "Knowledge and Understanding" but known locally as "Books", the sculpture was cast from a set of real books, and bears the words "Knowledge", "Trust", "Friendship" and "Understanding" in English on one stack of books, and in German on the other.
