= Church of St Peter-le-Bailey =

Coordinates: 51.75253°N 1.26061°W

St Peter-le-Bailey
- Church of St Peter-le-Bailey
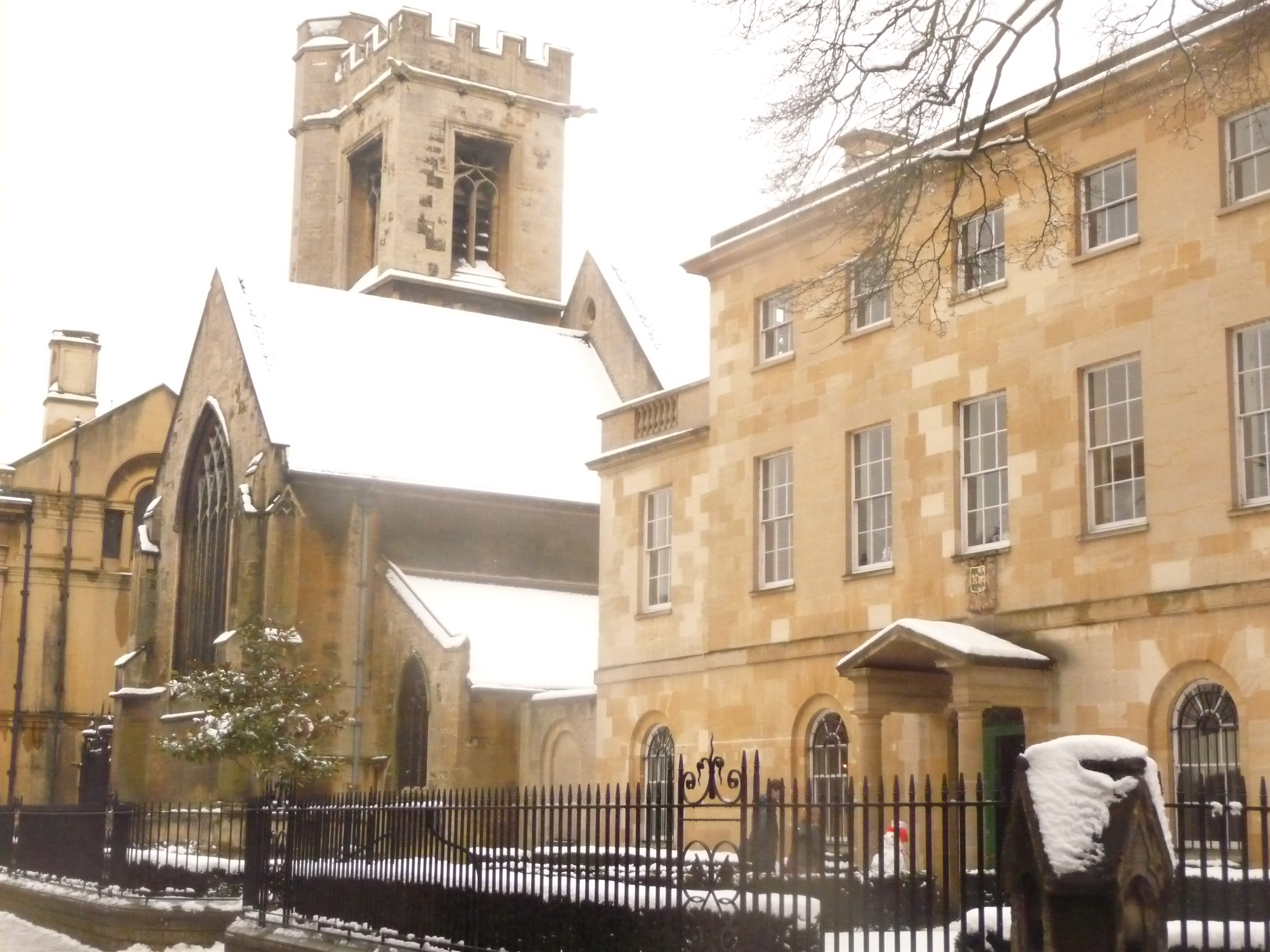
- St Peter-le-Bailey, now St Peter's College chapel
- St Peter-le-Bailey
- OS grid reference: SP 51128 06239
- Location: New Inn Hall, Oxford
- Country: England
- Denomination: Church of England
- Website: St Peter's College: chapel

Architecture
- Style: Victorian Gothic Revival
- Years built: 1874

Administration
- Diocese: Oxford
- Parish: St Ebbe with Holy Trinity and St Peter-le-Bailey

The Church of St Peter-le-Bailey is a church on New Inn Hall Street in central Oxford, England. It was formerly next to Bonn Square, which was originally the churchyard. Now it is located halfway up New Inn Hall Street to the north. Several churches have existed on or close to the site. The current church is now the chapel of St Peter's College, Oxford.

== History ==
The church of "St Peter at the Castle", subsequently known as "St Peter-in the-West" or "St Peter-le-Bailey", was granted to St Frideswide's Priory in 1122. The Church has existed in or near the area now known as Bonn Square, since the twelfth century The suffix "le-Bailey" was due to its position close to Oxford Castle. It also distinguished it from Oxford's other church dedicated to St Peter, namely St Peter-in-the-East, near the original east gate of the city, now the library of St Edmund Hall.

Since the inception of the parish, there have been three different church buildings. The first church was built in the 12th century. It had a single, pitched-roofed nave with a low tower at the southwest corner.

A second church was built on the site of the original church, opening in 1740. It was a flat roofed rectangular building with a tower at the northwest corner. The churchyard remained in its original position since there was no room to expand it. The church remained in use until the middle of the 19th century, when in 1848 Holywell Cemetery, Osney Cemetery, and St Sepulchre's Cemetery opened. In 1855, new burials were forbidden at all city churches, apart from existing vaults. This church was demolished in 1873 as part of a road widening scheme.

The third church was built to the north of the old church, approximately halfway along New Inn Hall Street, to designs by Basil Champneys. It was opened in 1874 and was photographed by Henry Taunt. When St Peter's Hall was founded in 1928, this church took on the combined role of the parish church and a college chapel. In 1961, St Peter's Hall became a full Oxford University college. In the same year, with a decreasing number of residents in the parish, it was merged with St Ebbe's and the church building was solely used as the college chapel.

The original churchyard was retained as a memorial garden when the church was moved in 1874. Many of the gravestones were moved at that time.

== Excavations ==
Bonn Square was redeveloped in 2008 and this made it possible to inspect and record a number of gravestones which had been buried since the church on the site was demolished in 1873. During the redevelopment, Oxford Archaeology undertook the archaeological investigations on behalf of Oxford City Council.

== See also ==
- St Peter-in-the-East at St Edmund Hall, Oxford
- Tirah Memorial, a war memorial erected in 1900
