= St Ebbe's Church, Oxford =

Coordinates: 51°45′02″N 1°15′35″W

St Ebbe's Church
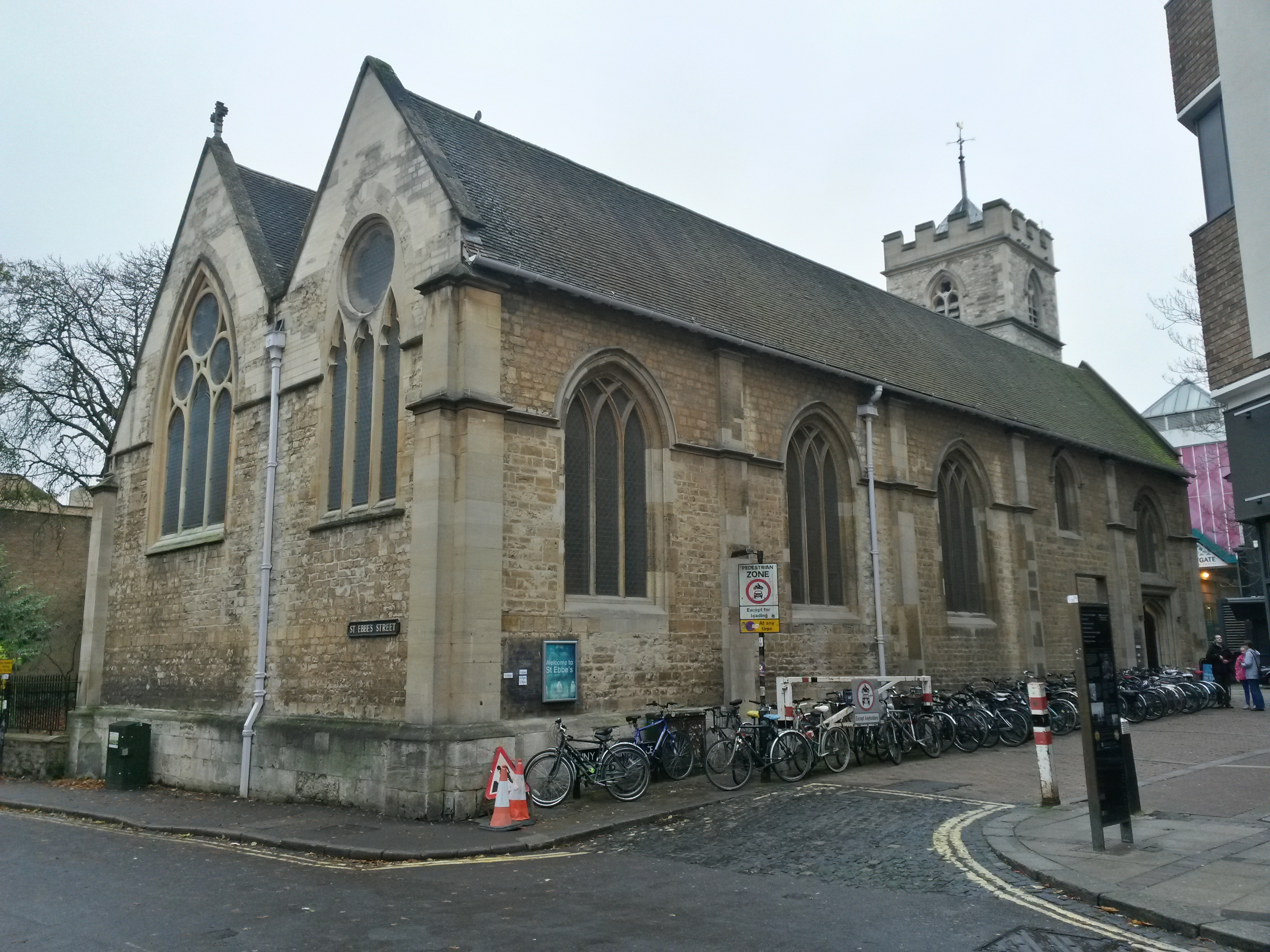
- St Ebbe's Church
- OS grid reference: SP 51203 06024
- Location: Pennyfarthing Place, Oxford, Oxfordshire
- Country: England
- Denomination: Church of England
- Churchmanship: Conservative Evangelical
- Website: stebbes.org

History
- Status: Active
- Dedication: St Ebbe

Architecture
- Functional status: Parish church

Administration
- Diocese: Diocese of Oxford
- Archdeaconry: Archdeaconry of Oxford
- Deanery: Deanery of Oxford
- Parish: Oxford, St. Ebbe with Holy Trinity and St. Peter-le-Bailey

Clergy
- Bishop: The Rt Revd Rob Munro (AEO)
- Rector: The Revd Canon Vaughan Roberts

St Ebbe's is a Church of England parish church in central Oxford, named after the seventh-century abbess Æbbe of Coldingham. The church is within the conservative evangelical tradition and participates in the Anglican Reform movement. It has members from many nations, many of whom are students at Oxford University. The rector is Vaughan Roberts who is also an author and conference speaker.

== History ==
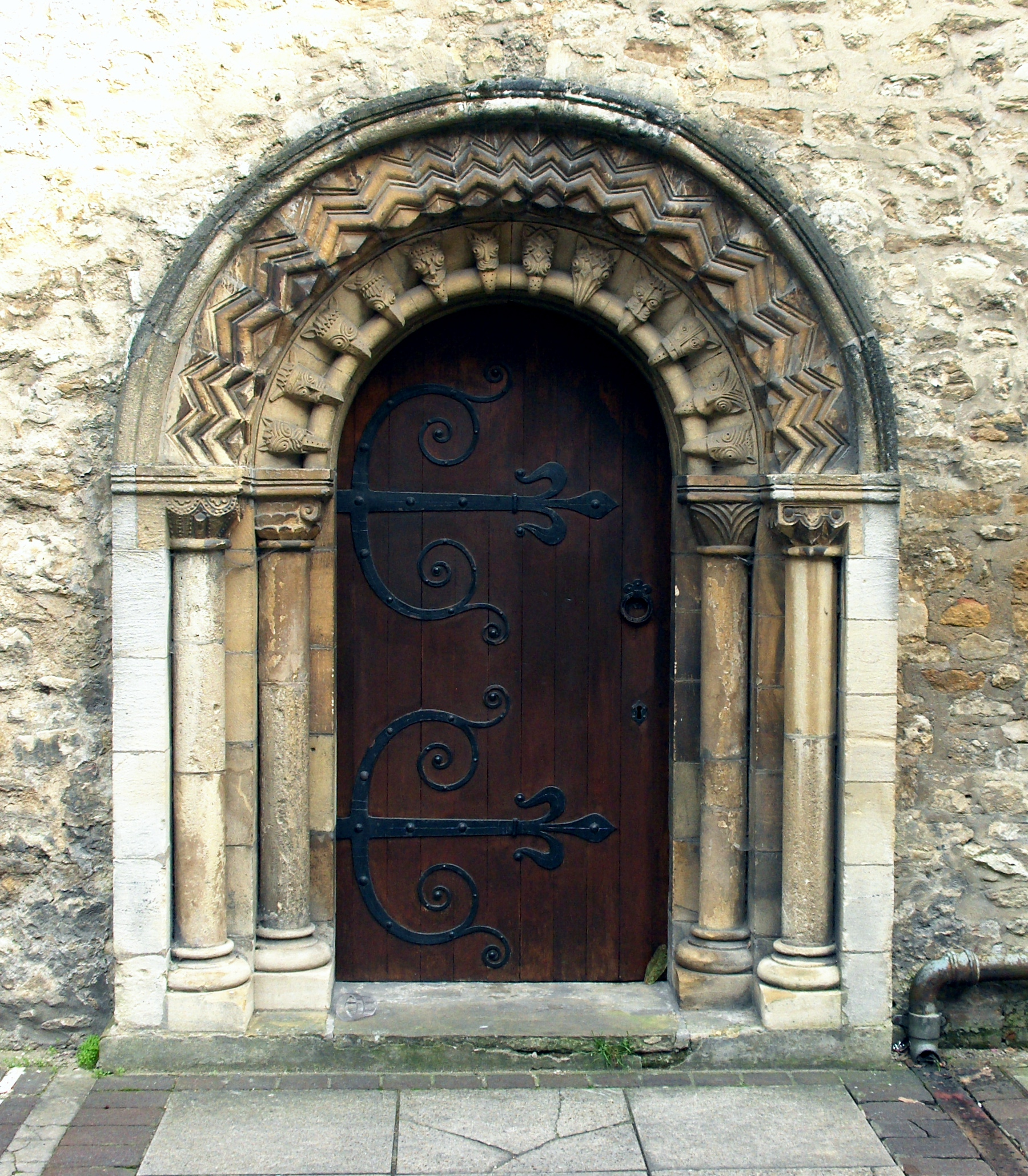
Norman period west door

The church stands on the site of one dedicated to St Æbbe before 1005. Most sources suggest that this was the Northumbrian St Æbbe of Coldingham, but it has been suggested that Æbbe of Oxford was a different saint. The name was first recorded in about 1005 when the church was granted to Eynsham Abbey by Ealdorman Æthelmær the Stout, when it was already recorded as the "ancient St Ebbe's".

The present church was built in 1814–16. It was restored between 1862 and 1868, and again in 1904. A Norman doorway of the 12th century has been restored and placed at the west end. The church is the parish church for the parish of St Ebbes, a portion of which was demolished to make way for the nearby Westgate Shopping Centre in the 1970s. The church underwent further restoration in 2017 under the direction of Quinlan Terry. During this restoration some internal fittings were sold as architectural antiques. The organ was transferred to St Denys, York.

In 1957, the church of Holy Trinity, Blackfriars Road, was demolished having been deemed unsafe. This was merged into the present parish. In 1961, the parish of St Peter-le-Bailey merged with St Ebbe upon the foundation of St Peter's College (formerly St Peter's Hall) and its use of the church as its college chapel.

== Present day ==
St Ebbe's continues to be highly active, with three services each Sunday at 10:00, 4:00 and 6:30. There are also a range of mid-week groups and youth work.

St Ebbe's is within the Conservative Evangelical tradition of the Church of England, and it has passed resolutions to reject the ordination of women and/or female leadership. It receives alternative episcopal oversight from the Bishop of Ebbsfleet (currently Rob Munro).

The church has a ministry among the remaining part of the parish, although most of its members live outside the parish. The church is a partner church of St Ebbe's Primary School, a school within the parish.

== Ministers ==
=== Rectors ===
- 15??-1550: Thomas Dobson
- 1550-1553: Ralph Rudde; Principal of St Edmund Hall
- 1553-1576: Vacant
- 1576-1585: John Paule
- 1589-1593: William Singleton
- 1593-1604: John Hilliard
- 1604-1631: Jacob Yate
- 1631-1641: Edward Wyrley
- 1643-1648: Hugh Boham; Chaplain of All Souls College
- 1664-1666: Richard Tapping
- 1690-1691: Thomas Shewring
- 1695-1696: Josias Dockwray
- 1696-1697: Henry Hellier
- 1697-1707: William Baker; later the Bishop of Norwich
- 1707-1714: John Knott
- 1714-1719: Matthew Panting; Master of Pembroke College
- 1719-1727: Bernard Peisley
- 1727-1734: Thomas Hillman
- 1736-1742: Nathaniel Bliss; later the fourth Astronomer Royal
- 1742-1753: Thomas Camplin; Vice-Principal of St Edmund Hall and later the Archdeacon of Taunton
- 1753-1771: Robert Ewings
- 1771-1809: Henry Richards
- 1808-1868: William Hambury; later Chaplain to George IV
- 1868-1874: E.P. Hathaway
- 1874-1877: Thomas Valpy French, later Bishop of Lahore
- 1881: John Arkell
- 1901-1909: P.W.G. Filleul
- 1912-1926: John Stansfeld
- 1947–1952: Maurice Wood, later Principal of Oak Hill College and Bishop of Norwich
- 1952–1964: Basil Gough
- 1964–1985: Keith Weston
- 1986–1998: David Fletcher
- 1998–present: Vaughan Roberts

=== Curates ===
- 1816: John Penson
- 1822-1824: William Wilson
- 1825: Henry Bliss
- 1826-1831: Henry Bulteel
- 1831-1837: William Champneys
- 1837-1842: H.B. Whitaker Churton
- 1847-1860: G.T. Cameron
- 1860-18??: S.Y.N. Griffith
- 1934-1936: Pat Gilliat
- 1950-1952: Edward Saunders
- 1952-1956: Michael Farrer
- 1955-1958: David Pytches, later Bishop of Chile, Bolivia and Peru
- 1957-1960: Peter Dawes
- 1958-1960: Brian Ringrose
- 1960-1963: Patrick Harris
- 1961-1964: James Spence
- 1963-1966: Anthony Baker
- 1964-1968: Gilbert Gauntlett
- 1966-1972: Simon Starkey
- 1968-1971: John Wesson
- 1971-1974: Robert Hope
- 1973-1976: Anthony Burdon
- 1974-1976: Peter Toon
- 1976-1980: Robert Key
- 1980-1983: David Banting
- 1983-1986: Kevin Scott
- 1988-1991: Timothy Hastie-Smith, later Director of Scripture Union (England & Wales).
- 1991-1998: Vaughan Roberts, later Rector
- 1995-2001: David Gibb
- 1999-2003: Anthony Jones
- 2002–present: Pete Wilkinson
- 2003-2008: Julian Bidgood
- 2008-2012: Phil Jack
- 2009–present: David Reid
- 2010-2014: Suresh Menon
- 2013-2018: James Fletcher
- 2013-2017: Alistair Gibbs
- 2017–2019: Matt Pope
- 2017–2021: Joel Knight
- 2021–present: Glenn Nesbitt

=== Non-stipendiary ministers ===
- 2005-2008: Sam Allberry
- 2012-2013: Phil Jack
- 2015–present: James Poole
- 2016–present: John Miller

=== Deacons ===
- 1979-1991: Jean Ritchie
- 1991-1993: Patricia Whelan
