= Oxford Westgate Library =

Coordinates: 51°45′05″N 1°15′36″W

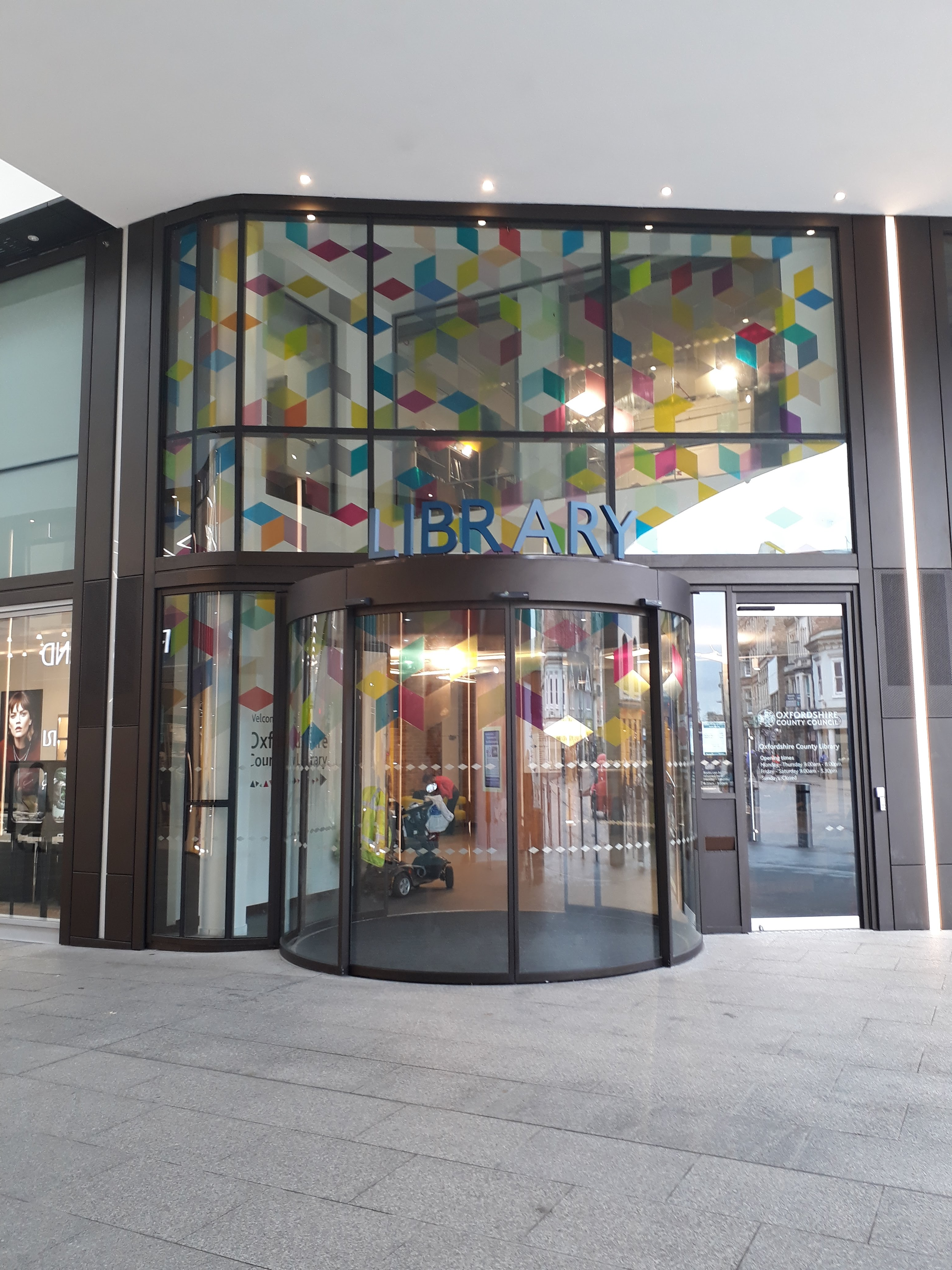
Oxford Westgate Library entrance in 2018.

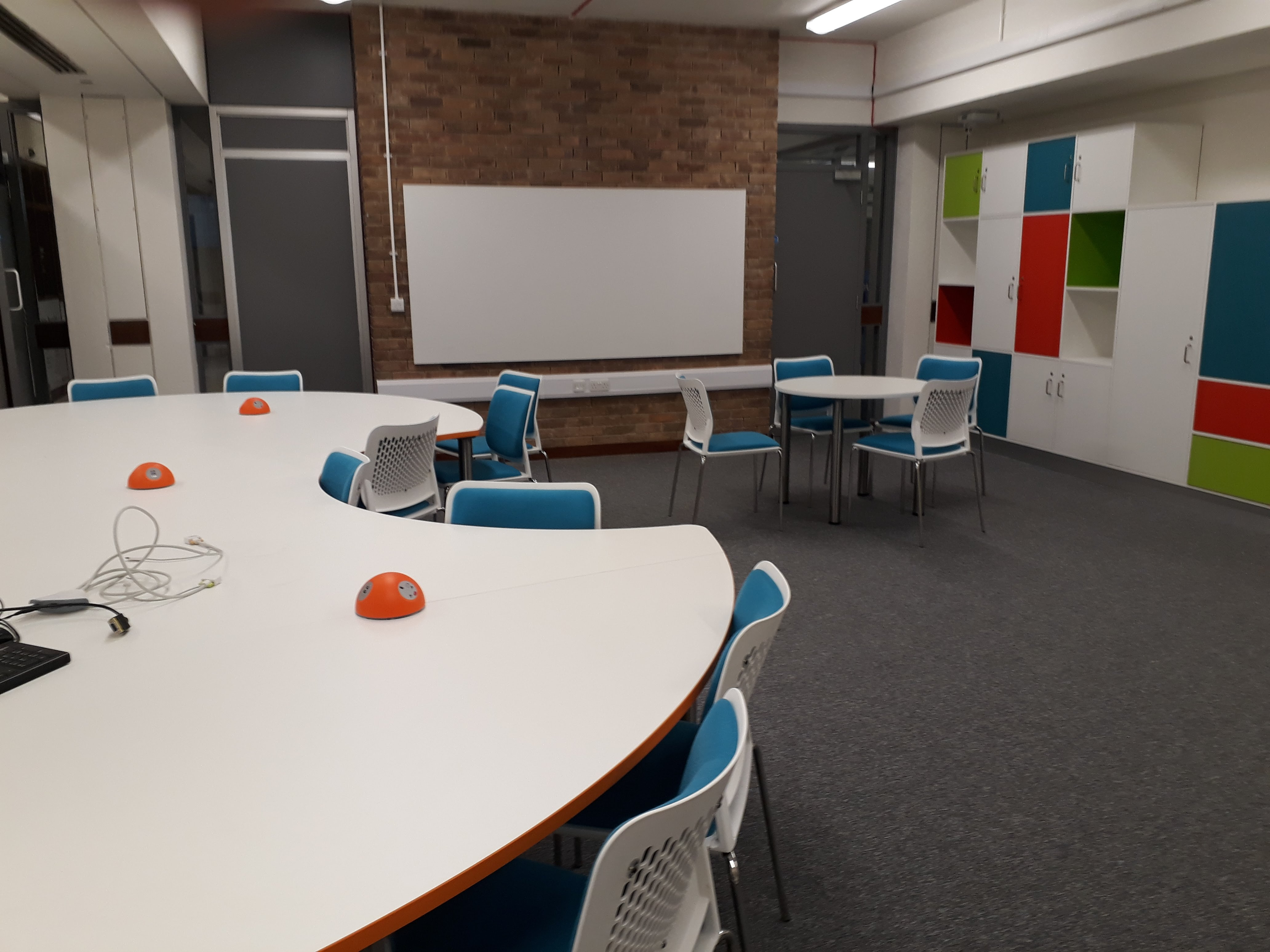
Interior of the Oxford Westgate Library Makerspace

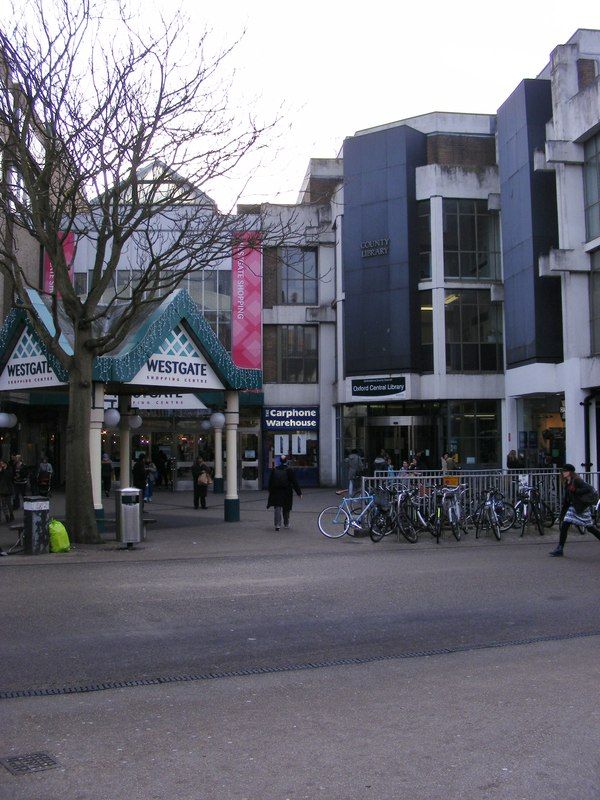
The old Oxford Central Library, prior to the 2017 renovation.

Oxford Westgate Library is the main public library in the city of Oxford, England. It is the largest public lending library in Oxfordshire, as the far larger Bodleian Library predominantly operates only as a reference library.

The library opened in its current location in 1973 as Oxford Central Library above shops in Westgate, Oxford. Over 500,000 items are available for loan. The library is run by Oxfordshire County Council. Due to the redevelopment of the Westgate Centre, the library closed to the public on 27 February 2016. During the Westgate redevelopment it temporarily relocated to a smaller location in the neighbouring Oxford Castle complex.

The library reopened at the Westgate on 18 December 2017 as Oxfordshire County Library, before changing to the current name of Oxford Westgate Library on 30 October 2023 to mark the 50th birthday of the library opening. The Oxfordshire Business & Intellectual Property Centre (BIPC) opened on the second floor of the library in April 2022.

The library holds books in these languages: English, Arabic, Bengali, Chinese, French, German, Italian, Pashto, Polish, Russian, Spanish, Ukrainian and Urdu.
