= Tirah Memorial =

War memorial in Oxford, England

Coordinates: 51.7517°N 1.2600°W

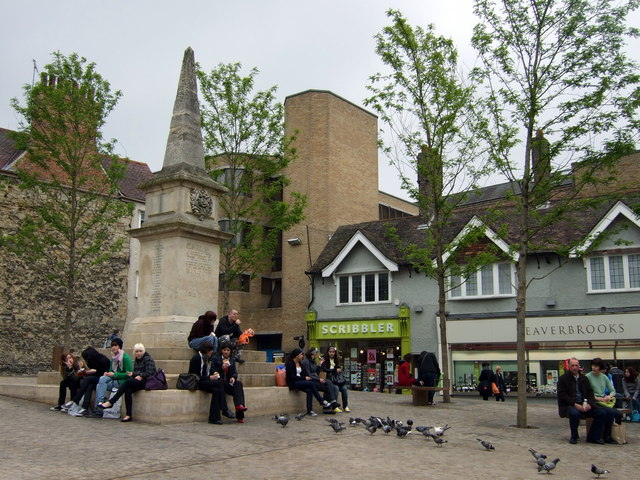
The Tirah Memorial in Bonn Square, Oxford

The Tirah Memorial is a war memorial in Bonn Square, Oxford, England. It commemorates soldiers of the 2nd Battalion Oxfordshire Light Infantry who died in 1897–98 on the Tirah Expedition and Punjab Frontier Campaign to suppress rebel tribes on the North West Frontier of British India.

== History ==
The Tirah Memorial was unveiled in 1900, making it Oxford's first free-standing war memorial.

The monument was designed by Inigo Thomas. It is an obelisk 25 feet (7.6 m) high, with foundations 20 feet (6.1 m) deep. It was erected in a public garden that had been the graveyard of St Peter-le-Bailey parish church and is now Bonn Square. The digging of the memorial's foundations unearthed human remains, which were re-interred at Osney Cemetery 1.2 miles (2 km) away.

The Tirah Memorial is a Grade II listed building.

== Other Tirah memorials ==
Men of the Dorset Regiment who died during the Tirah Expedition are commemorated by a Tirah Memorial in Borough Gardens, Dorchester, Dorset, southern England.

Men of the King's Own Scottish Borderers who died during the Tirah Expedition are commemorated on the memorial at North Bridge, Edinburgh, Scotland.

Men of the Royal Sussex Regiment who died during the Tirah Expedition are commemorated on a memorial at Eastbourne, East Sussex, southeast England.

Men of the Northamptonshire Regiment who died in the expedition are commemorated on a plaque on the exterior of All Saints' Church, Northampton.
