= New Inn Hall Street =

Street in central Oxford, England

Coordinates: 51°45′10″N 1°15′37″W

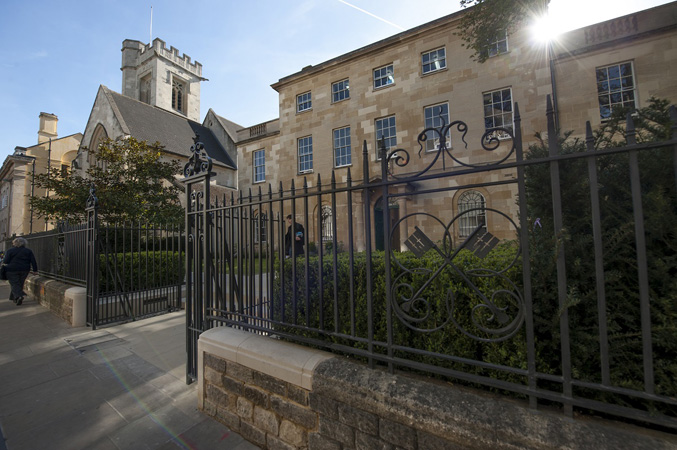
St Peter's College from New Inn Hall Street

New Inn Hall Street is a street in central Oxford, England, and is one of Oxford's oldest streets. It is a shopping street running north–south parallel and to the west of Cornmarket Street, with George Street to the north and Bonn Square at the west end of Queen Street to the south. St Michael's Street leads off the street to the east near the northern end. Shoe Lane, to the east, leads to the Clarendon Centre, a modern shopping centre.

St Peter's College, University of Oxford (formerly St Peter's Hall), is on the west side of the street. The college occupies the site of two of the University's oldest Inns (medieval hostels), Bishop Trilleck's, later New Inn Hall, after which the street is named, and Rose Hall, both founded in the 13th century. The college chapel was built in 1874 on New Inn Hall Street, originally as the parish Church of St Peter-le-Bailey. Two previous church buildings of the same name were previously at the southern end of the street, near Bonn Square, where the graveyard used to be. The church was so named because of its proximity to Oxford Castle.

Amongst the students of New Inn Hall was John Wesley, grandfather of the John and Charles Wesley regarded as the founders of Methodism. The first Methodist Meeting House in Oxford was in the street, on a site opposite its present-day successor Wesley Memorial Church.

Brasenose College's Frewin Hall annexe is on the west side of the street.

The former building of the City of Oxford High School for Boys, which closed in 1966, is on the corner with George Street.

== Gallery ==
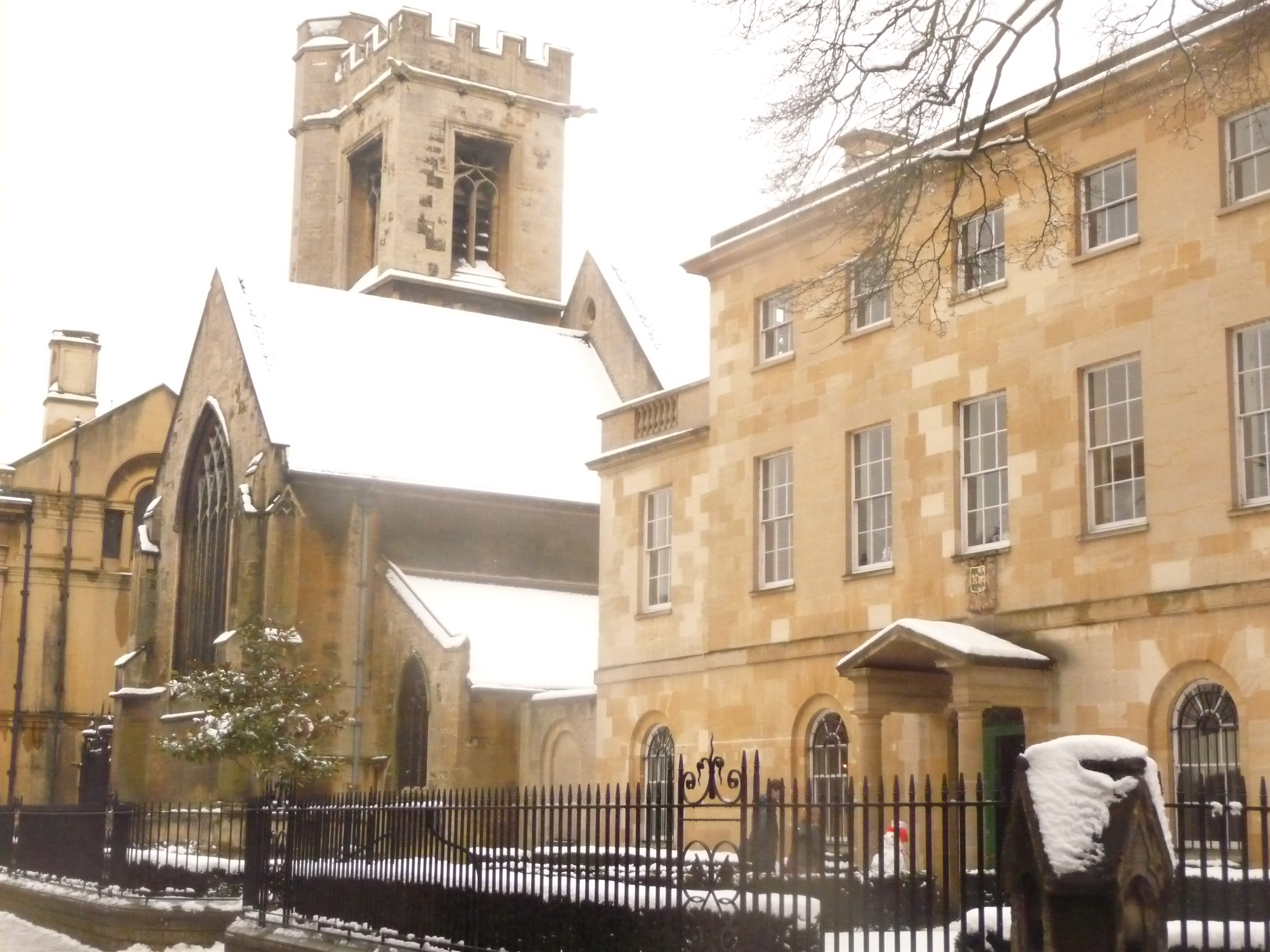
The Church of St Peter-le-Bailey, now the chapel of St Peter's College, on the left and the college porter's lodge on the right, in New Inn Hall Street

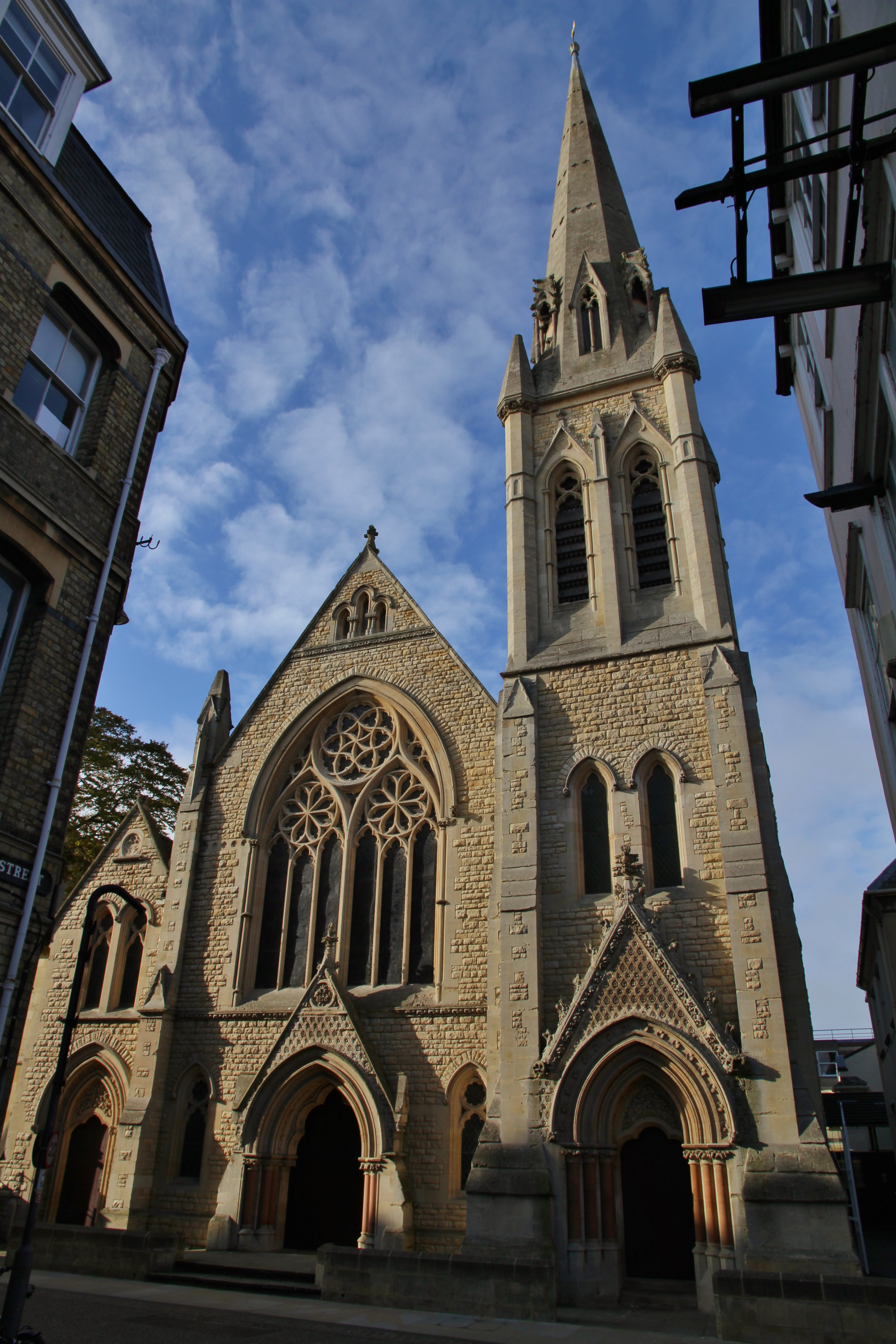
Wesley Memorial Church in New Inn Hall Street, at the junction with St Michael's Street

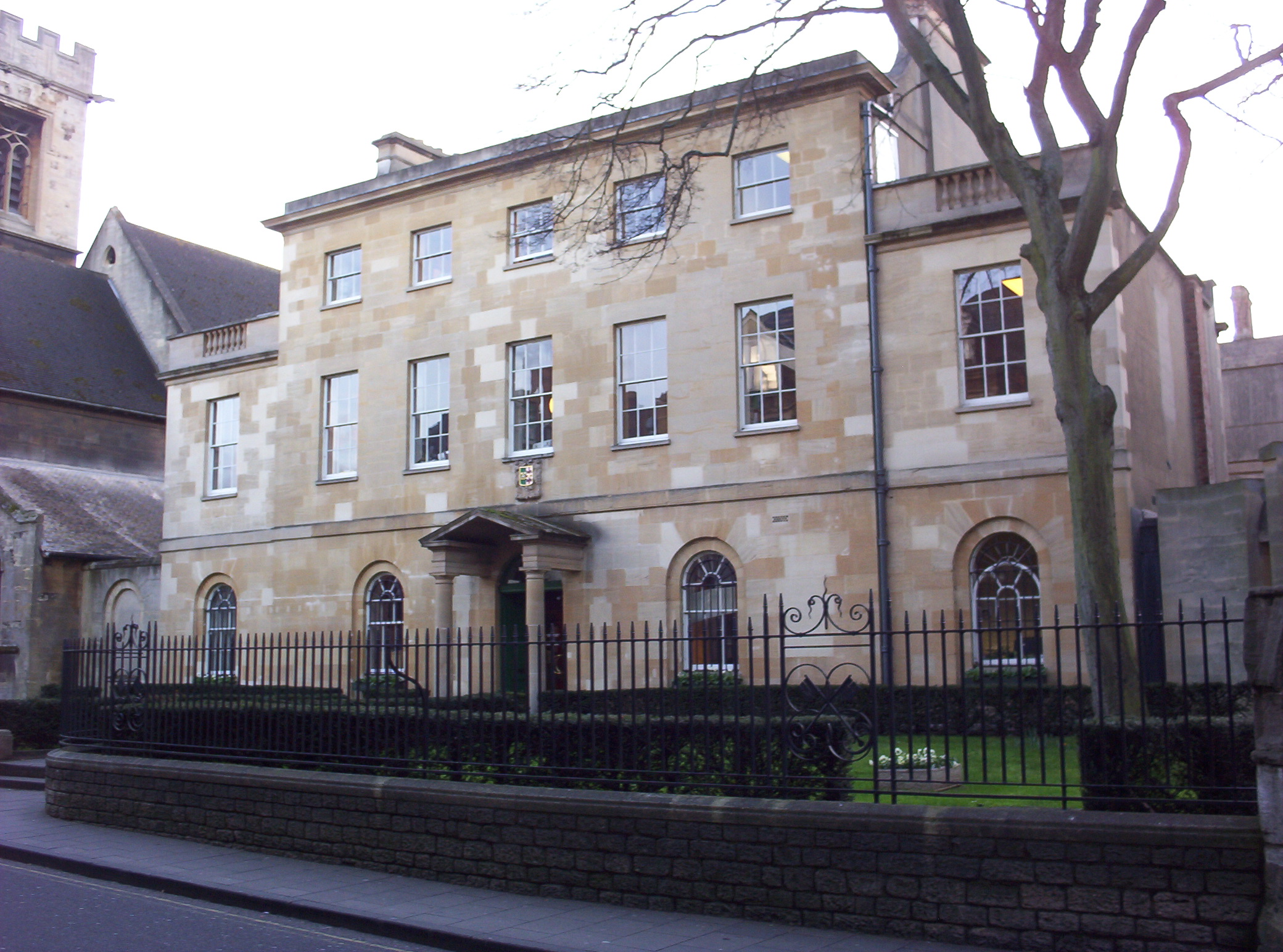
Part of St Peter's College in New Inn Hall Street
