= Westgate Oxford =

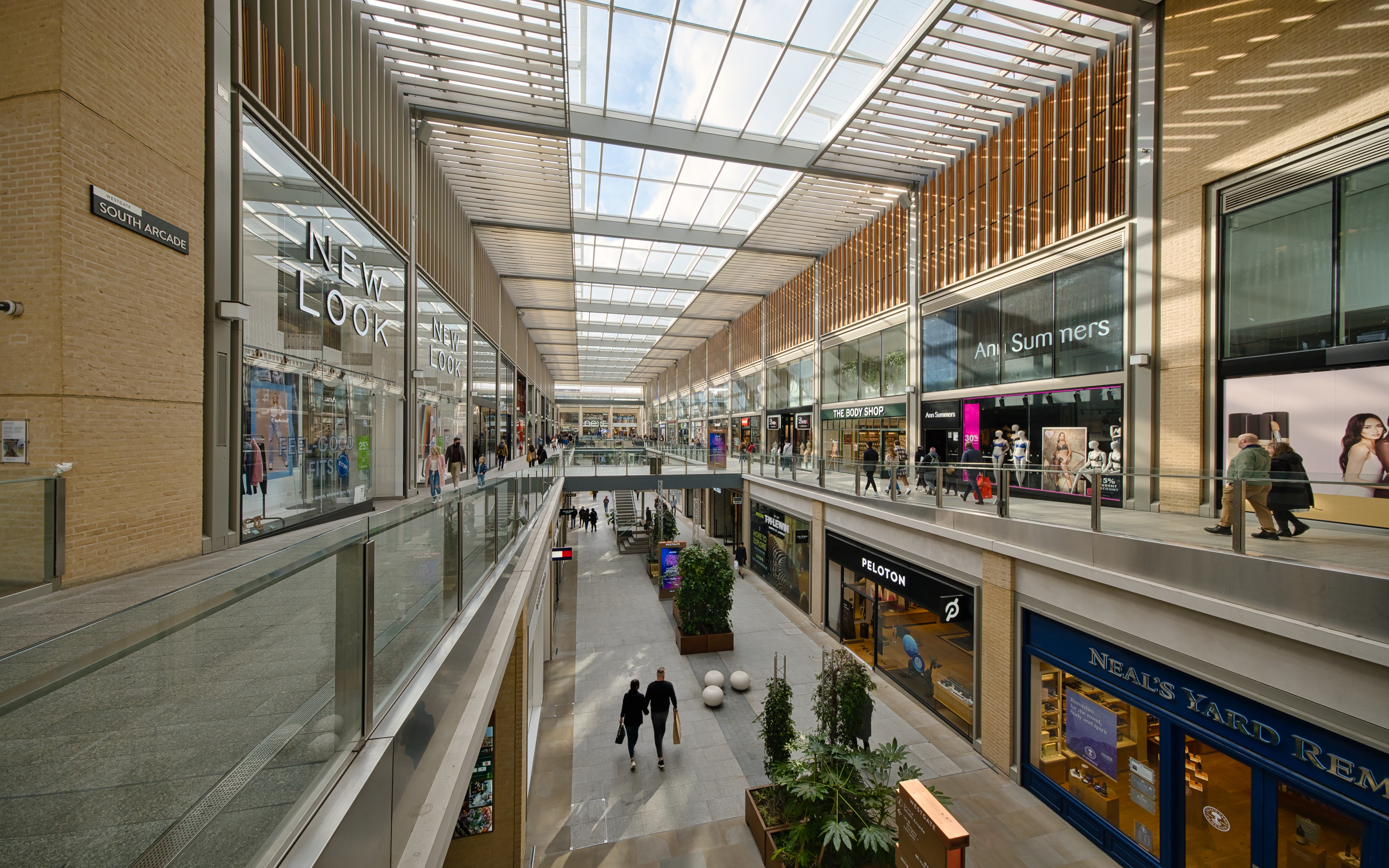
- South Arcade at Westgate Oxford shopping centre in 2022
- Location: Oxford, England
- Coordinates: 51.751°N 1.261°W
- Opened: 1972 (original building); Tuesday 24 October 2017 (enlarged building)
- Architect: Original building: Douglas Murray; Enlarged scheme: BDP, Dixon Jones, Allies & Morrison, Panter Hudspith, Glen Howells Architects
- Num. of stores: 125
- Num. of anchor tenants: 1 (John Lewis)
- Floor area: 800,000 square feet (74,000 m^{2})
- Website: www.westgateoxford.co.uk

Westgate Oxford (formerly the Westgate Centre and originally Westgate Shopping Centre) is a major shopping centre in Oxford city centre, England.

The original centre was built between 1970 and 1972, designed by Douglas Murray and built by Taylor Woodrow. The centre was closed in February 2016 for extensive remodelling and extension, and reopened on Tuesday 24 October 2017.

== Location ==
Westgate is at the west end of Queen Street, facing onto Bonn Square. The West Gate into the city of Oxford stood at the adjacent junction of Castle Street, Norfolk Street and Paradise Street until the mid-17th century, having stood there since the Saxon period, and the shopping centre is named after this former gateway into the city. The site is bordered by Bonn Square, Castle Street, Norfolk Street, Oxpens Road, Old Greyfriars Street, Roger Bacon Lane and St Ebbes Street, and is adjacent to the medieval Oxford Castle quarter to the northwest.

== History ==
The Westgate Shopping Centre opened in 1972, and was originally owned by Oxford City Council. The centre included branches of Selfridges, Sainsbury's and C&A. The central library was also moved to the centre from the Town Hall, being opened by Queen Elizabeth the Queen Mother, on 31 October 1973. Queen Elizabeth II and the Duke of Edinburgh visited in 1976.

The centre was sold in the 1980s to private owners; in 1986, they refurbished it, at a cost of £3 million. Two years later, an early proposal was made to extend the centre by its then owners, CIN Properties and Arrowcroft, but did not proceed. The large Selfridges, latterly a branch of Lewis's and then Allders, closed in 2005, and became a Primark in 2006.

Westgate Shopping Centre (1972-2016)
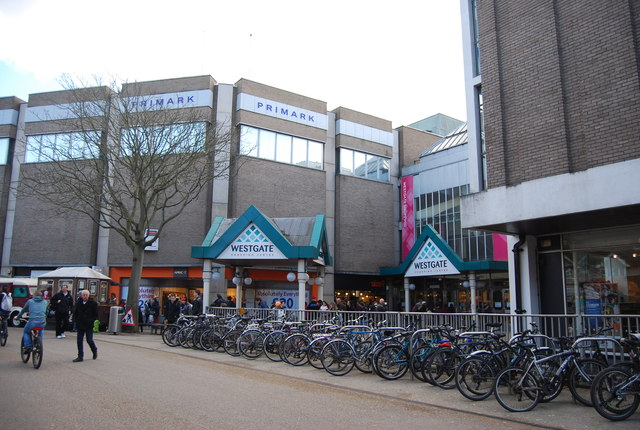
The front entrance of the Westgate Shopping Centre in Bonn Square

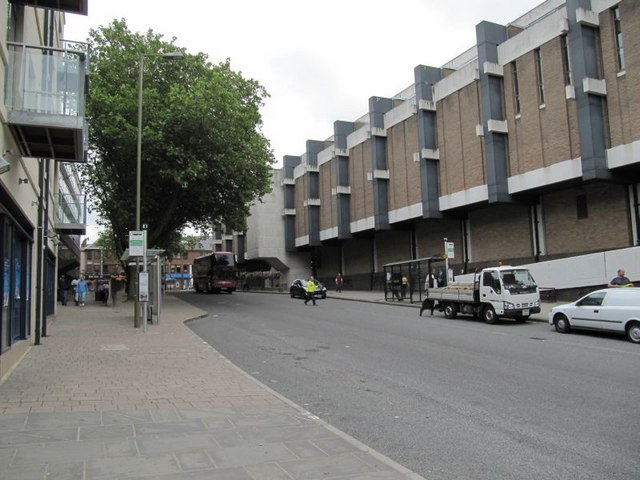
The western end of the Westgate Shopping Centre in Castle Street

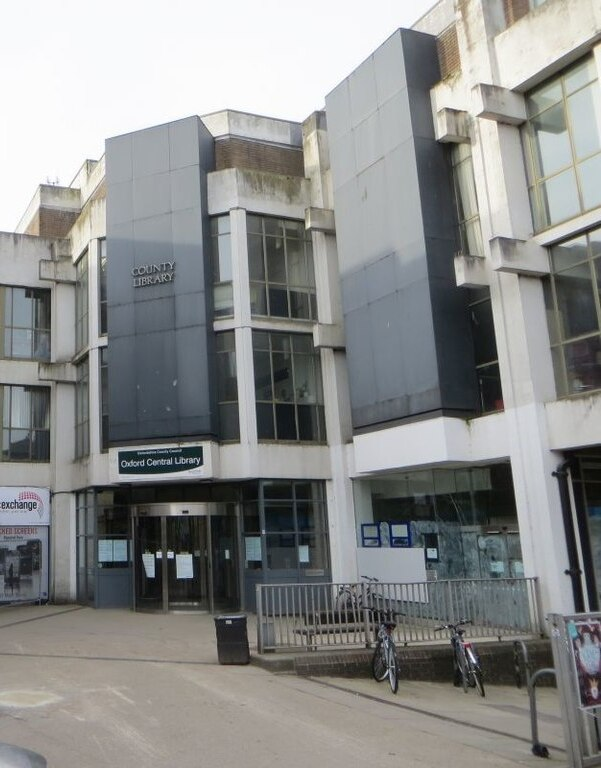
The entrance to the Oxford Central Library

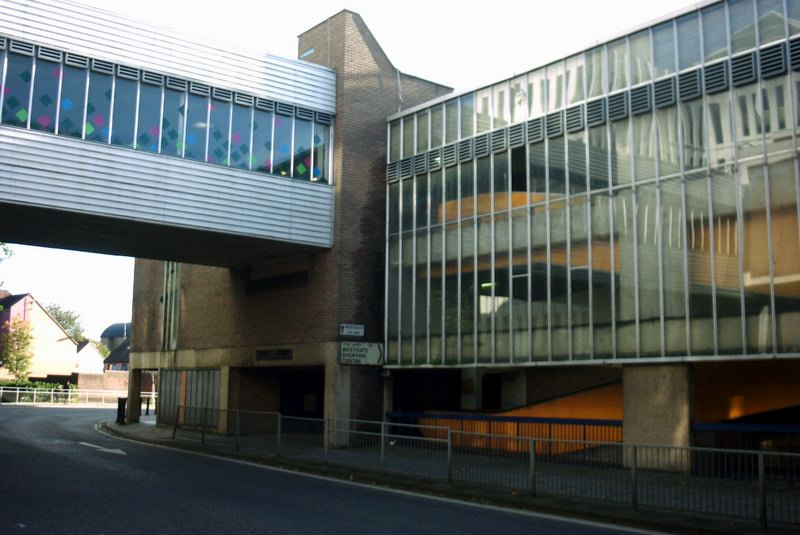
The Westgate car park and skyway to the shopping centre

== Redevelopment ==
Plans for the redevelopment of the Westgate area were originally published in 2004. Over the next several years, the plan underwent several rounds of consultation and inquiry. The eventual plan was adopted in the early 2010s, and development permission granted in November 2014. Architects for the constructed design are BDP in conjunction with Dixon Jones, Allies and Morrison, Panter Hudspith and Howells Architects, BDP responsible for the freely accessible roof providing views of the dreaming spires from restaurant concessions. Work on the development started in early 2015, and the original centre closed in 2016.

The developer was the Westgate Oxford Alliance, a joint venture between the Crown Estate and Land Securities Group Plc.

The new centre has almost 800,000 square feet (74,000 m^{2}) of retail, restaurant and leisure space including a new John Lewis, a rooftop dining terrace with views across Oxford's skyline, and a five screen Curzon Cinema. According to Oxford City Council, "the £500 million redevelopment of the Westgate Centre is a key part of the regeneration of Oxford city centre, creating high quality buildings designed by world-class architects and providing more than 3,400 new full-time equivalent jobs." The new centre reopened on 24 October 2017.

=== 2017 facilities ===
The 2017 Westgate has features and facilities including:

- Over 100 new shops including a John Lewis department store and various high street retailers
- Cafés and restaurants
- Leisure facilities including a cinema
- New landscaped walkway along Castle Mill Stream
- Two new public squares
- New pedestrian routes through the site
- Re-routed bus lane and new taxi drop-off / pick up
- Cycle parking
- Two-storey basement car park of between 900 and 1100 spaces
- 59 new one- and two-bedroom flats
Westgate Oxford (2017 - present)
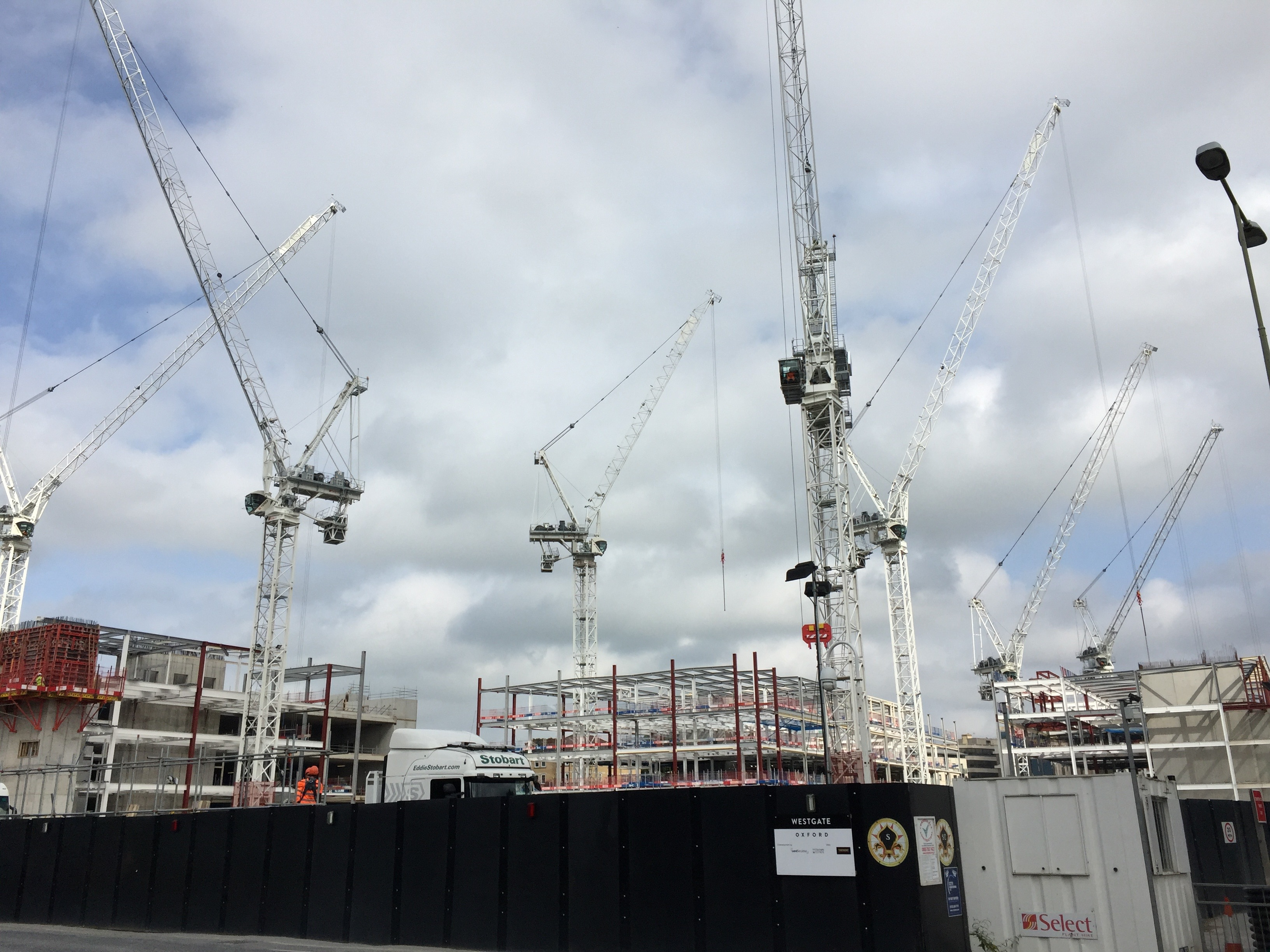
Construction of new Westgate in September 2016

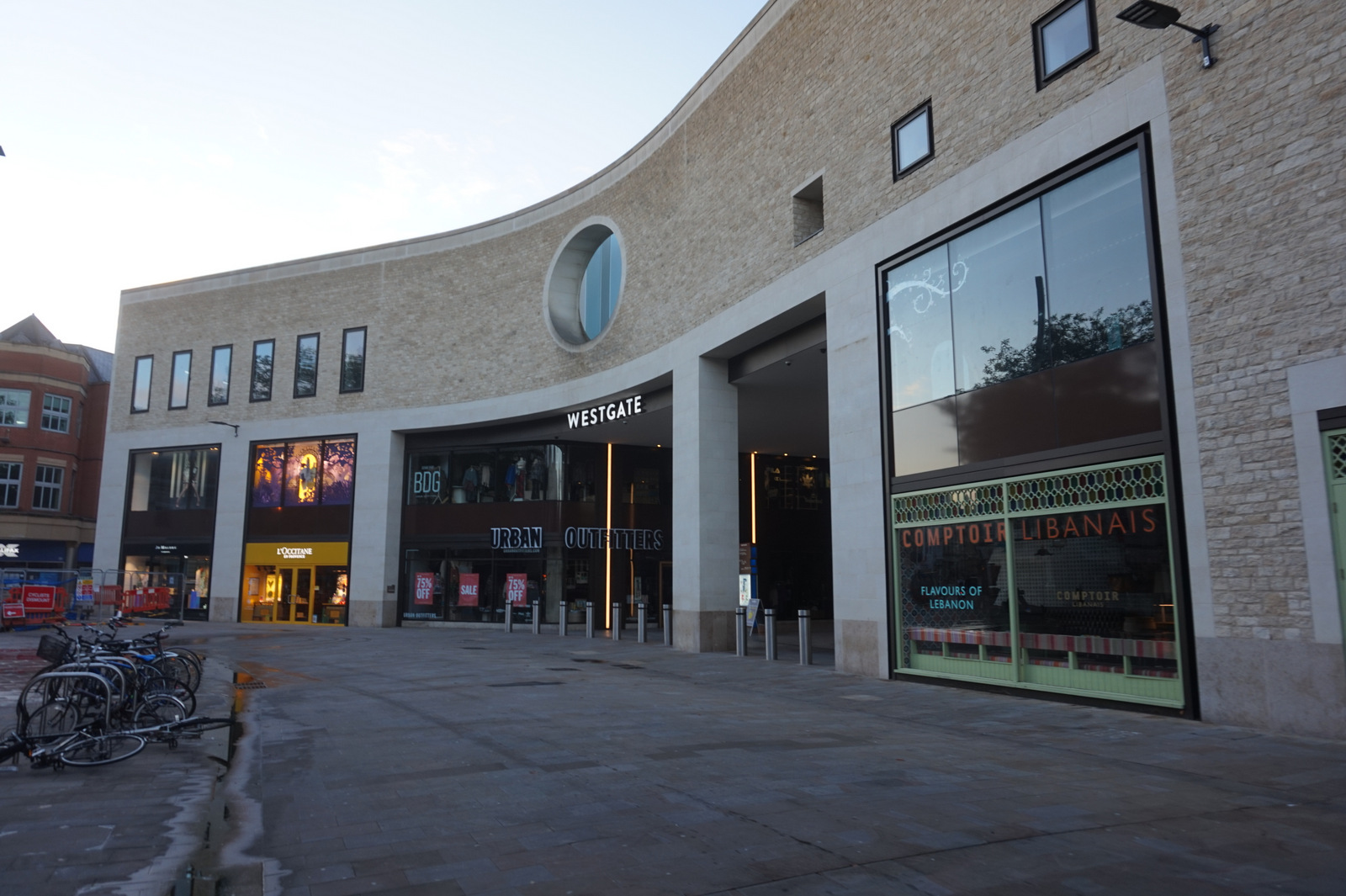
The front entrance of the new Westgate Oxford in Bonn Square

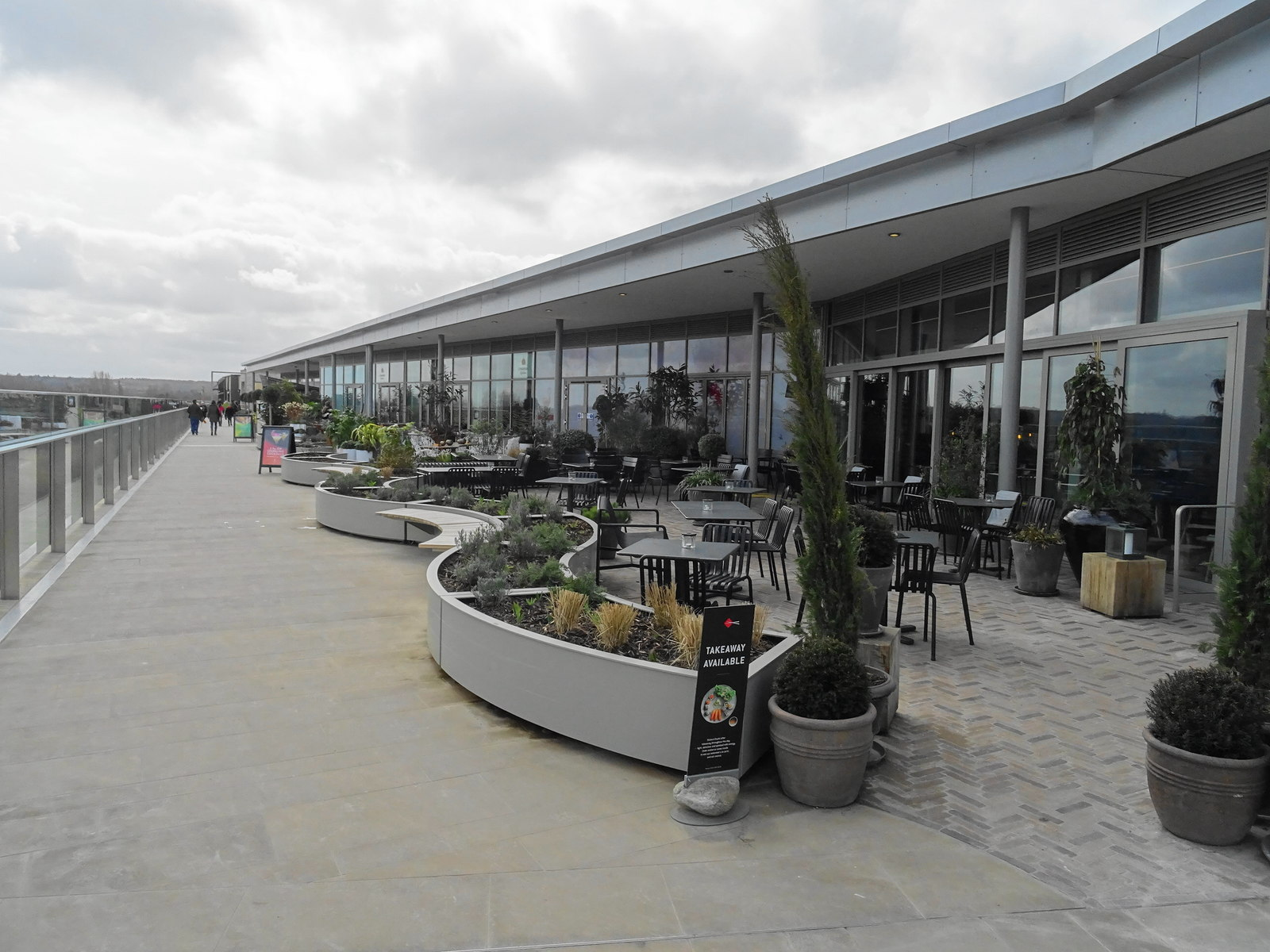
The Roof Terrace

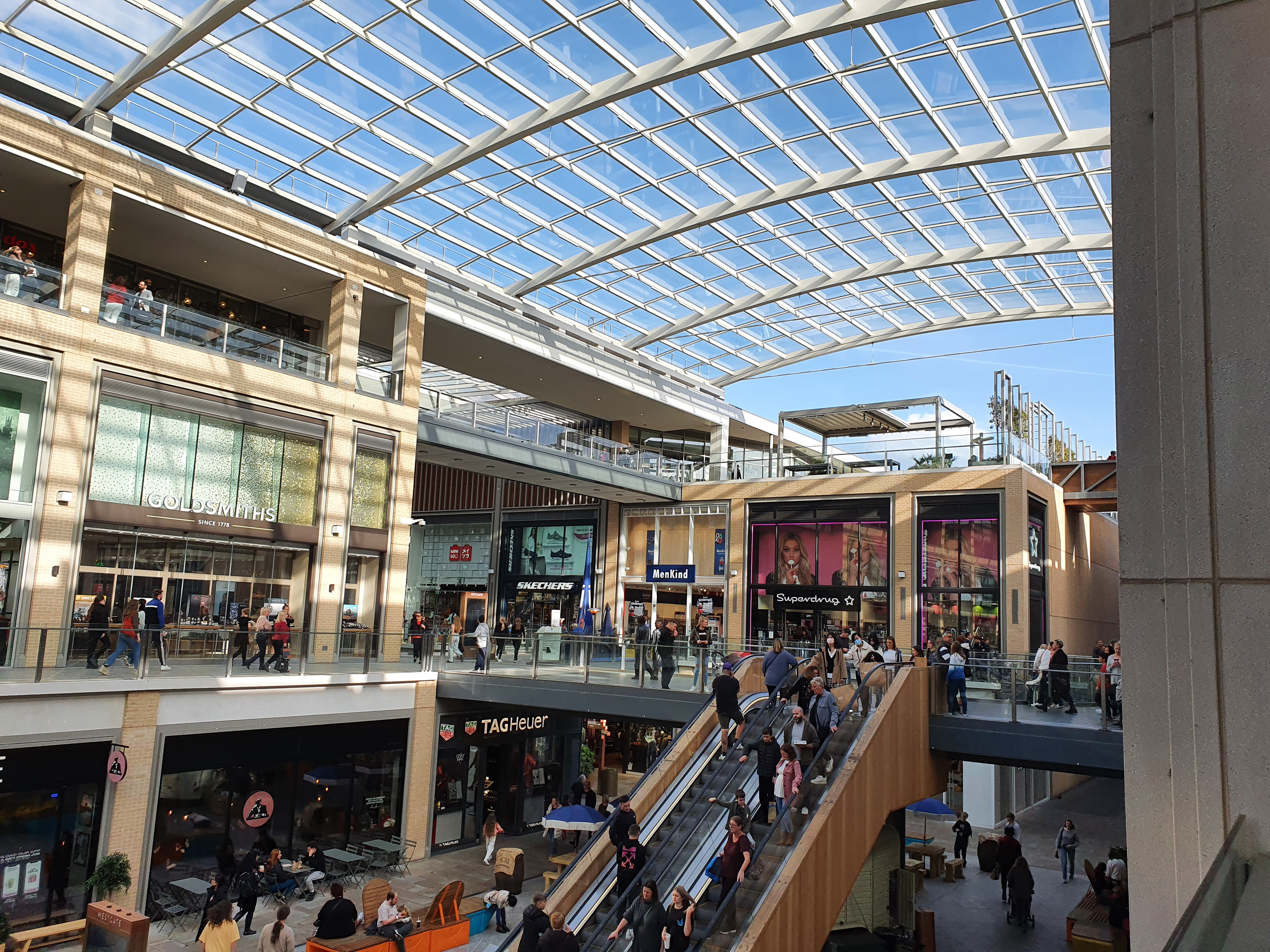
Westgate Oxford in October 2022

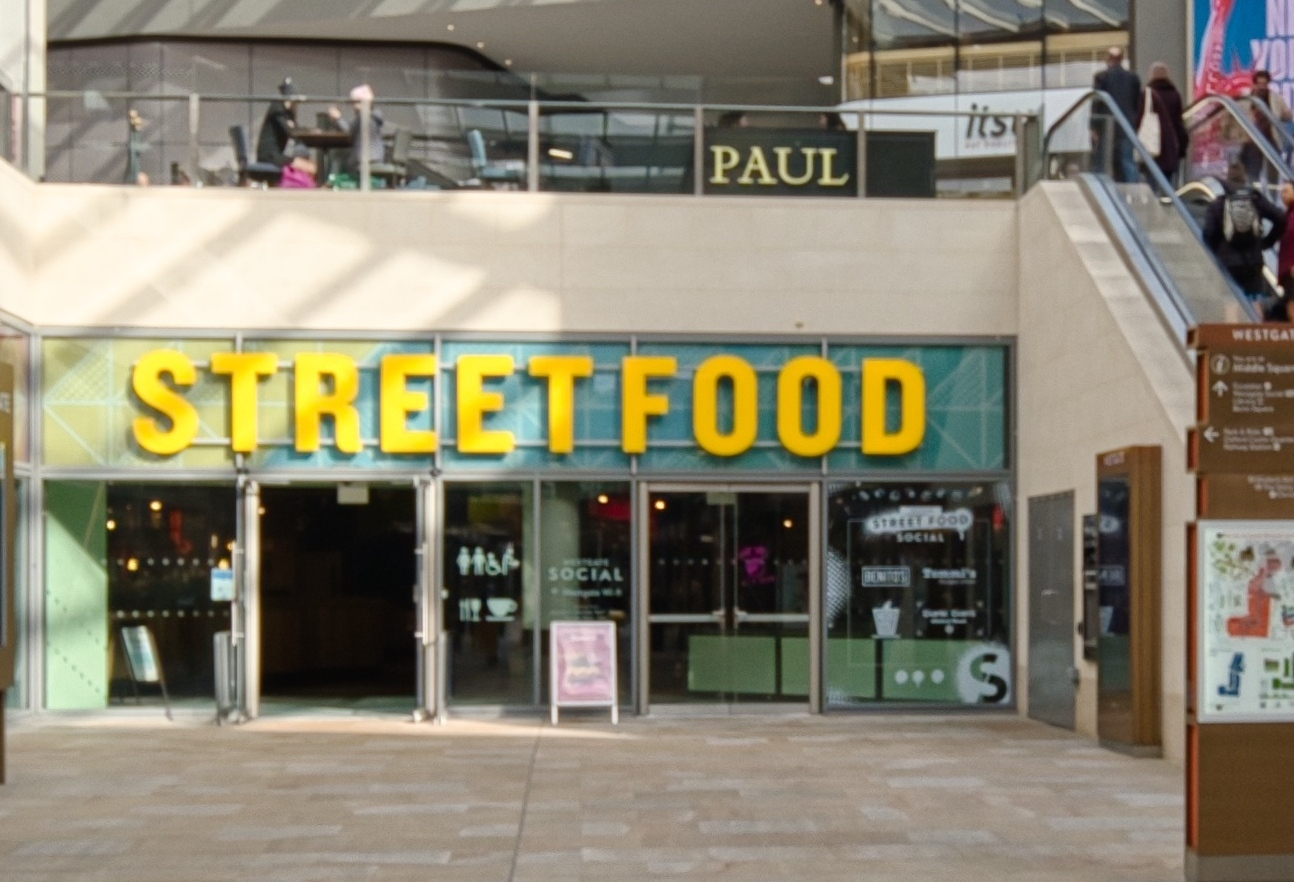
Westgate Social Street Food

== Criticism ==
=== Archeological remains ===
When the original centre was built in the 1970s, excavations for the service basements destroyed archaeological remains of part of medieval Oxford.

During the 2015–2017 redevelopment, Oxford Archaeology, working in conjunction with the developers and contractors, carried out architectural investigations into "the extensive remains of the medieval Greyfriars friary (AD 1244–1538)", with stone foundations, wooden and other artefacts, and part of a medieval tiled floor being discovered. The tiled floor is now on display in the centre. Remains from the excavations were temporarily displayed in the Museum of Oxford.

=== Urban planning and architecture ===
A local campaign group, called "Oxford Against Westgate Expansion", was formed to oppose the proposed redevelopment, holding a public meeting at the Oxford Town Hall on 28 February 2008. At the meeting, protestors voiced concerns about increased traffic and potential risk of flooding from the construction of an underground car park. A second meeting was held on 13 March that year.

There have also been concerns over the imposing and largely windowless wall at the southwest of the latest redevelopment on Oxpens Road by conservationists, including the Oxford Civic Society.

=== Queen Street closure ===
Oxfordshire County Council sought to ban buses from using Queen Street, which passes the Westgate Centre's main entrance. The council alleged that the increase in pedestrian numbers generated by the enlarged shopping centre would mean that it would no longer be safe for buses to use the street. The Secretary of State for Transport, Chris Grayling, declined the application, pointing out that the council had failed to provide evidence of its claim.

== See also ==
- St Ebbes
- Castle Street, Oxford
- Museum of Oxford
