= Oxford Archaeology =

Archaeology company in England

Coordinates: 51.7476°N 1.2764°W

Oxford Archaeology Limited
- Type: Charity, Private company limited by guarantee
- Industry: Archaeology; Cultural Heritage
- Founded: 1973
- Headquarters: Oxford, UK
- Number of locations: Oxford, Lancaster, Cambridge (As of June 2011)
- Revenue: 15,707,424 pound sterling (2020)
- Number of employees: 250 (2014)
- Website: oxfordarchaeology.com

Oxford Archaeology (OA, trading name of Oxford Archaeology Limited) is one of the largest and longest-established independent archaeology and heritage practices in Europe, operating from three permanent offices in Oxford, Lancaster and Cambridge, and working across the UK. OA is a Registered Organisation with the Chartered Institute for Archaeologists (CIfA), and carries out commercial archaeological fieldwork in advance of development, as well as a range of other heritage related services. Oxford Archaeology primarily operates in the UK, but has also carried out contracts around the world, including Sudan, Qatar, Central Asia, China and the Caribbean. Numbers of employees vary owing to the project-based nature of the work, but in 2023 OA employed over 350 people.

The registered head office is in Osney Mead, Oxford, southern England; this address is also the base for OA's Oxford office. Other offices are in Lancaster, northern England, and Cambridge, based at Bar Hill, Cambridgeshire, eastern England. Between 2007 and 2011, OA had offices in Mauguio (OA Méditerranée), southern France and Caen (OA Grand Ouest), northern France.

== Oxford Archaeology, Oxford Office ==
In the late 1960s, the recently created Oxford City and County Museum led the archaeological response to a development boom in Oxfordshire. However, the museum lacked the resources to tackle the rescue crisis alone. The museum's answer was to form independent excavation committees in response to specific development threats, starting in Oxford in 1967. These committees were registered charities with public benefit at the heart of their purpose. They employed short-term contract staff, supplemented by volunteer diggers.

Soon a number of committees were operating, which tended to have the same governing members drawn from Central and Local Government, Oxford University and local archaeological societies. They also competed for the same funds. A consensus rapidly emerged that this duplication was wasteful and that all the committees should pool their resources to provide a county-wide service for archaeological research, using the opportunities presented by development. Thus, the Oxfordshire Archaeological Committee and its executive arm, the Oxfordshire Archaeological Unit, came into existence in 1973.

In the following years, the company adjusted flexibly to changing conditions, and expanded outside the county (hence the change in name to the Oxford Archaeological Unit). It also became a limited liability company, adjusted to new funding streams, and it embraced new methods and technologies. The company began trading as Oxford Archaeology in 2001.

Recent notable excavations include the excavation of prehistoric flint scatters and a Roman bloomery at the Bexhill-Hastings Link Road, the medieval friary of Greyfriars at Westgate Oxford, and a WWI mass grave of Australian soldiers at Fromelles.

== Oxford Archaeology, Lancaster Office ==
The Lancaster University Archaeological Unit (LUAU), together with its staff, became the northern office of Oxford Archaeology on 1 November 2001. This followed a decision that the needs of a professional archaeological unit could no longer be best served by its continuance within the university. The Lancaster office continued the wide range of work undertaken in the past, from desk-based assessments, through evaluation and rapid surveys of both the landscape and the built and industrial environments, to major excavations. Particular specialisations are upland survey and the excavation and recording of standing industrial remains.

The Lancaster office has taken the lead within OA on all archaeological projects carried out by the organisation throughout the north of England. It has worked on a great number of sites across northern England, and brought them to publication. These have included infrastructure projects on the A1(M), A66, the Asselby to Pannal and West East Link Main pipelines, and the Carlisle North Development Route (CNDR). The Lancaster office has also worked extensively on cemeteries and burials across northern England, including a Viking cemetery at Cumwhitton, medieval and post-medieval graveyards, and at Furness Abbey where a high-ranking clergyman was excavated. Since the North was the cradle of the Industrial Revolution, the investigation of factories, mills and workers’ housing also forms an important part of the work carried out by the Lancaster office.

== Oxford Archaeology, Cambridge Office ==
In 2008, Cambridgeshire County Council's Field Unit, CAMARC, joined Oxford Archaeology as its third regional centre. CAMARC itself was a recently revised name for an organisation that had been given a variety of titles over more than 20 years of existence. Its lineage started in the early 1980s with Manpower Services Commission-funded community programme projects, and it continued to carry out developer-funded work in the mid-80s as the 'Archaeological Field Unit'.

The Cambridge office continues to deliver major programmes for infrastructure projects and for smaller-scale developments in both rural and urban areas. Its large rural landscape projects include complex Middle Bronze Age field systems, enclosures and settlements at Clay Farm, Trumpington. Recent urban schemes include the Itter Crescent Roman villa excavation in Peterborough and excavations of Victorian and Medieval settlement relating to Stourbridge Fair at Harvest Way, Newmarket Road, Cambridge.

== Publication ==
Having published some 230 monographs, reports and booklets, Oxford Archaeology has established itself as a major publisher of archaeological reports with the production of monograph series, such as Thames Valley Landscapes and Lancaster Imprints, and contributions to other major series, including East Anglian Archaeology Reports. OA has also produced many ‘popular’ publications, pamphlets and booklets written in a less technical style.

List of publications:

Title	Year of publication	Series
Wallingford: the archaeological implications of development, Oxford	1973	Oxfordshire Archaeological Unit Surveys
Excavations on the route of the M40	1973	Oxoniensia Special Volume
The Upper Thames Valley: an archaeological survey of the river gravels	1974	Oxfordshire Archaeological Unit Surveys
Historic towns in Oxfordshire: a survey of the new county, Oxfordshire	1974	Oxfordshire Archaeological Unit Surveys
Archaeology and agriculture: a survey of modern cultivation methods and the problems of assessing plough damage to archaeological sites	1977	Oxfordshire Archaeological Unit Surveys
The excavation of an Iron Age settlement, Bronze Age ring-ditches and Roman features at Ashville Trading Estate, Abingdon (Oxfordshire), 1974-76	1978	CBA Research Report
Iron Age and Roman riverside settlements at Farmoor, Oxfordshire	1979	CBA Research Report
Archaeology at Barton Court Farm, Abingdon, Oxfordshire	1984	CBA Research Report
The Rollright Stones: megaliths, monuments, and settlement in the prehistoric landscape	1988	English Heritage Archaeological Report
Archaeology on the Cambridgeshire County Farms Estate: a review of archaeological management on the estate	1990	Cambridgeshire County Council
An Iron Age and Romano-British enclosed settlement at Watkins Farm, Northmoor, Oxon	1990	Thames Valley Landscapes
Reading Business Park: a Bronze Age landscape	1992	Thames Valley Landscapes
The prehistoric landscape and Iron Age enclosed settlement at Mingies Ditch, Hardwick-with-Yelford, Oxon	1993	Thames Valley Landscapes
Excavations at Roughground Farm, Lechlade, Gloucestershire: a prehistoric and Roman landscape	1993	Thames Valley Landscapes
The wetlands of Merseyside	1994	Lancaster Imprints
The wetlands of Greater Manchester	1995	Lancaster Imprints
The wetlands of north Lancashire	1995	Lancaster Imprints
Excavations at the Devil's Quoits, Stanton Harcourt, Oxfordshire, 1972-3 and 1988	1995	Thames Valley Landscapes
In Harvey's House and in God's House: excavations at Eynsham Abbey 1991-3	1995	Thames Valley Landscapes
Lithics and landscape: archaeological discoveries on the Thames Water pipeline at Gatehampton Farm, Goring, Oxfordshire 1985-92	1995	Thames Valley Landscapes
Two Oxfordshire Anglo-Saxon Cemeteries: Berinsfield and Didcot	1995	Thames Valley Landscapes
Transect through time: the archaeological landscape of the Shell North Western Ethylene Pipeline (English section)	1996	Lancaster Imprints
The Archaeology of Lancashire: present state and future priorities	1996	Lancaster University Archaeological Unit
The wetlands of Cheshire	1997	Lancaster Imprints
Derwentcote Steel Furnace: an industrial monument in County Durham	1997	Lancaster Imprints
Asthall, Oxfordshire: excavations in a Roman 'small town', 1992	1997	Thames Valley Landscapes
The Anglo-Saxon Cemetery at Edix Hill (Barrington A), Cambridgeshire: excavations 1989-1991 and a summary catalogue of material from 19th century interventions	1998	CBA Research Report
The Still, Peterborough: medieval remains between Cumbergate and Westgate	1998	CCC AFU Monograph
The wetlands of Shropshire and Staffordshire	1998	Lancaster Imprints
Excavations at Springhead Roman Town, Southfleet, Kent	1998	OAU Occasional Paper
The Anglo-Saxon Cemetery at Butler's Field, Lechlade, Gloucestershire. Volume 1: prehistoric and Roman activity and grave catalogue	1998	Thames Valley Landscapes
Excavations at Larkwhistle Farm, Brimpton, Berkshire	1999	OAU Occasional Paper
Excavations at Thatcham Northern Distributor Road, Berkshire	1999	OAU Occasional Paper
Excavations at Duffield House, Woodley, Berkshire	1999	OAU Occasional Paper
Excavations at Friar Street, Reading, Berkshire	1999	OAU Occasional Paper
Excavations alongside Roman Ermin Street, Gloucestershire and Wiltshire: the archaeology of the A419/417 Swindon to Gloucester road scheme	1999	Oxford Archaeological Unit Report
Excavations at Barrow Hills, Radley, Oxfordshire. Volume 1: the Neolithic and Bronze Age monument complex	1999	Thames Valley Landscapes
The lowland wetlands of Cumbria	2000	Lancaster Imprints
Bremetenacum: excavations at Roman Ribchester 1980, 1989-90	2000	Lancaster Imprints
Excavations at The Paddock, Rectory Lane, Fringford	2000	OAU Occasional Paper
Excavation of the medieval waterfront at King Stable Street, Eton, Berkshire	2000	OAU Occasional Paper
Urban archaeological practice in Ireland	2000	Oxford Archaeological Unit Strategic Reviews
Review of archaeological assessment and monitoring procedures in Ireland	2000	Oxford Archaeological Unit Strategic Reviews
Excavations at Wyndyke Furlong, Abingdon, Oxfordshire, 1994	2000	Thames Valley Landscapes
Roman forts in the fylde: excavations at Dowbridge Close, Kirkham 1994	2000	University of Lancaster
Henry VIII's coastal artillery fort at Camber Castle, Rye, East Sussex	2001	English Heritage Archaeological Report
The excavation of medieval and post-medieval remains at Poyle House, Berkshire	2001	OAU Occasional Paper
Beaumont Palace and the White Friars: excavations at the Sackler Library, Beaumont Street, Oxford	2001	OAU Occasional Paper
The excavation of a medieval rural settlement at the Pepper Hill Lane Electricity Substation, Northfleet, Kent	2001	OAU Occasional Paper
Evaluation of archaeological decision-making processes and sampling strategies	2001	Oxford Archaeological Unit Strategic Reviews
Excavations at Melford Meadows, Brettenham, 1994: Romano-British and early Saxon occupations	2002	East Anglian Archaeology Report
Unpublished excavations in the Republic of Ireland, 1930-1997	2002	Oxford Archaeological Unit Strategic Reviews
The Hotties: excavation and building survey at Pilkington's No 9 Tank House, St Helens, Merseyside	2002	Lancaster Imprints
Steeped in history: the alum industry of north-east Yorkshire	2002	North York Moors National Park Authority
Excavations in the extramural settlement of Roman Alchester, Oxfordshire, 1991	2002	Oxford Archaeology Monograph
The excavation of a medieval manor house of the bishops of Winchester at Mount House, Witney, Oxfordshire, 1984-1992	2002	Thames Valley Landscapes
Gathering the people, settling the land: the archaeology of a middle Thames landscape, Anglo-Saxon to medieval	2002	Thames Valley Landscapes
A late Iron Age farmstead and Romano-British site at Haddon, Peterborough	2003	CCC AFU Monograph
The Anglo-Saxon cemetery at Worthy Park, Kingsworthy, near Winchester, Hampshire	2003	Oxford University School of Archaeology Monograph
Lines in the landscape: cursus monuments in the Upper Thames Valley; excavations at the Drayton and Lechlade cursuses	2003	Thames Valley Landscapes
Aelfric's Abbey: excavations at Eynsham Abbey, Oxfordshire, 1989-92	2003	Thames Valley Landscapes
Oxford before the University: the late Saxon and Norman archaeology of the Thames Crossing, the defences and the town	2003	Thames Valley Landscapes
Thomas Telford's Holyhead Road: the A5 in North Wales	2004	CBA Research Report
The Tower of London Moat: archaeological excavations 1995-9	2004	Historic Royal Palaces Monograph
Old Abbey Farm, Risley: building survey and excavation at a medieval moated site	2004	Lancaster Imprints
Prehistoric and Romano-British settlement at Queen Elizabeth Square, Maidstone	2004	OA Occasional Paper
Uffington White Horse and its Landscape: investigations at White Horse Hill, Uffington, 1989–95 and Tower Hill, Ashbury, 1993-4	2004	Thames Valley Landscapes
Green Park (Reading Business Park): Phase 2 excavations 1995. Neolithic and Bronze Age sites	2004	Thames Valley Landscapes
Yarnton: Saxon and medieval settlement and landscape: results of excavations 1990-96	2004	Thames Valley Landscapes
Thornhill Farm, Fairford Gloucestershire: an Iron Age and Roman pastoral site in the Upper Thames Valley	2004	Thames Valley Landscapes
Gravelly Guy, Stanton Harcourt: the development of a prehistoric and Romano-British community	2004	Thames Valley Landscapes
Archaeology of the Jubilee Line extension: prehistoric and Roman activity at Stratford Market Depot, West Ham, London, 1991-1993	2005	Museum of London Archaeology Service
Kilkenny city walls: conservation plan	2005	Oxford Archaeology Strategic Reviews
Barentin's Manor: excavations of the moated manor at Harding's Field, Chalgrove, Oxfordshire 1976-9	2005	Thames Valley Landscapes
Landscape evolution in the middle Thames Valley: Heathrow Terminal 5 excavations. Volume 1: Perry Oaks	2006	Framework Archaeology Monograph
The Tower of London New Armouries project	2006	OA Occasional Paper
Late Bronze Age ritual and habitation on a Thames Eyot at Whitecross Farm, Wallingford: the archaeology of the Wallingford Bypass 1986-92	2006	Thames Valley Landscapes
Edward III's round table at Windsor	2007	Arthurian Studies
Fairfield Park: later prehistoric settlement in the eastern Chilterns	2007	Bedfordshire Archaeology Monograph
The archaeology of the A1(M) Darrington to Dishforth DBFO road scheme	2007	Lancaster Imprints
A&G Murray and the cotton mills of Ancoats	2007	Lancaster Imprints
Excavations of medieval and early post-medieval features at 90-93 Broad St, Reading, and the excavation of medieval pits and a probable 16th- to 17th-century tavern or inn at 7-8 Broad St, Reading Berkshire, 2002	2007	OA Occasional Paper
A Roman rural landscape at Kempsford Quarry, Gloucestershire	2007	OA Occasional Paper
From stadium to station: Rewley Abbey and Rewley Road Station, Oxford	2007	OA Occasional Paper
Recent developments in research and management at World Heritage Sites	2007	OA Occasional Paper
Archaeology in Bath: excavations at the New Royal Baths (the Spa), and Bellott's Hospital 1998-1999	2007	Oxford Archaeology Monograph
Death and taxes: the archaeology of a Middle Saxon estate centre at Higham Ferrers, Northamptonshire	2007	Oxford Archaeology Monograph
Newtown Jerpoint, County Kilkenny: conservation plan	2007	Oxford Archaeology Strategic Reviews
A slice of rural Essex: archaeological discoveries from the A120 between Stansted Airport and Braintree	2007	Oxford Wessex Monograph
Excavations at Radley Barrow Hills, Radley, Oxfordshire. Volume 2: the Romano-British cemetery and Anglo-Saxon settlement	2007	Thames Valley Landscapes
Iron Age and Roman settlement in the Upper Thames Valley: excavations at Claydon Pike and other sites within the Cotswold Water Park	2007	Thames Valley Landscapes
The Thames through time: the early historical period. Rome and the Anglo-Saxons in the Thames Valley c AD 1-1000	2007	Thames Valley Landscapes
Settlement on the Bedfordshire Claylands: archaeology along the A421 Great Barford Bypass	2008	Bedfordshire Archaeology Monograph
A late Iron Age farmstead and Romano-British site at Haddon, Peterborough	2008	CCC AFU Monograph
Ely wares	2008	East Anglian Archaeology Report
From hunter gatherers to huntsmen: a history of the Stansted landscape	2008	Framework Archaeology Monograph
Norton Priory: monastery to museum excavations, 1970-87	2008	Lancaster Imprints
The Roman roadside settlement at Westhawk Farm, Ashford, Kent. Excavations 1998-9	2008	Oxford Archaeology Monograph
‘Safe Moor’d in Greenwich Tier’: a study of the skeletons of Royal Navy sailors and marines excavated at the Royal Hospital	2008	Oxford Archaeology Monograph
Life and Death in a Roman city: excavation of a Roman cemetery with a mass grave at 120-122 London Road, Gloucester	2008	Oxford Archaeology Monograph
The archaeology of the M6 Toll 2000-2003	2008	Oxford Wessex Archaeology Monograph
Saved from the grave: Neolithic to Saxon discoveries at Spring Road municipal cemetery, Abingdon, Oxfordshire	2008	Thames Valley Landscapes
The Carlisle Millennium Project: excavations in Carlisle 1998-2001. Volume 1: stratigraphy	2009	Lancaster Imprints
The Carlisle Millennium Project: excavations in Carlisle 1998-2001. Volume 2: finds	2009	Lancaster Imprints
Appleford's earliest farmers: archaeology at Appleford Sidings, Oxon, 1993-2000	2009	OA Occasional Paper
Archaeology in the park: excavations at Jennett's Park, Bracknell, Berkshire	2009	OA Occasional Paper
Between villa and town: excavations of a Roman roadside settlement and shrine at Higham Ferrers, Northamptonshire	2009	Oxford Archaeology Monograph
‘In the vaults beneath’: archaeological recording at St George's Church, Bloomsbury	2009	Oxford Archaeology Monograph
The Thames through time: the first foundations of modern society in the Thames Valley, 1500 BC - AD 50	2009	Thames Valley Landscapes
Excavations at Taplow Court, Buckinghamshire: a late Bronze Age and Iron hillfort	2009	Thames Valley Landscapes
Farmers and Ironsmiths: prehistoric, Roman and Saxon settlement at land near Brandon Road, Thetford, Norfolk, 2002	2010	East Anglian Archaeology Report
Landscape evolution in the middle Thames Valley: Heathrow Terminal 5 excavations, volume 2	2010	Framework Archaeology Monograph
Neolithic to Saxon social and environmental change at Mount Farm, Berinsfield, Dorchester-on-Thames	2010	OA Occasional Paper
Castle Hill and its landscape: archaeological investigations at the Wittenhams, Oxfordshire	2010	Oxford Archaeology Monograph
The late Roman cemetery at Lankhills, Winchester, excavations 2000-2005	2010	Oxford Archaeology Monograph
Evolution of a farming community in the Upper Thames Valley: excavation of a prehistoric, Roman and post-Roman landscape at Cotswold Community, Gloucestershire and Wiltshire	2010	Thames Valley Landscapes
Carlisle: excavations at Rickergate, 1998-9 and 53-55 Botchergate, 2001	2011	Cumbria Archaeological Research Report
Archaeology of the Newland: excavations in King's Lynn, Norfolk 2003-5	2011	East Anglian Archaeology Report
Life and afterlife at Duxford, Cambridgeshire: archaeology and history in a chalkland community	2011	East Anglian Archaeology Report
Bewsey Old Hall, Warrington, Cheshire: excavations 1977-81 and 1983-5	2011	Lancaster Imprints
Excavations in North-West Kent, 2005-2007: one hundred thousand years of human activity in and around the Darent Valley	2011	Oxford Archaeology Monograph
Winchester, a city in the making: archaeological excavations between 2002-2007 on the sites of Northgate House, Staple Gardens and the former Winchester Library, Jewry St	2011	Oxford Archaeology Monograph
‘Finished labour of a thousand hands’: the archaeology of the Combe Down Stone Mines, Bath, Somerset	2011	Oxford Archaeology Monograph
From Mesolithic to motorway: the archaeology of the M1 (Junction 6A-10) widening scheme	2011	Oxford Archaeology Monograph
Trade and prosperity, war and poverty: an archaeological and historical investigation into Southampton's French Quarter	2011	Oxford Archaeology Monograph
Historic landscape characterisation in Ireland: best practice guidance	2011	Oxford Archaeology Strategic Reviews
Settling the Ebbsfleet Valley: High Speed 1 excavations at Springhead and Northfleet, Kent, the late Iron Age, Roman, Saxon and medieval landscape. Volume 1: the sites	2011	Oxford Wessex Archaeology Monograph
Settling the Ebbsfleet Valley: High Speed 1 excavations at Springhead and Northfleet, Kent, the late Iron Age, Roman, Saxon and medieval landscape. Volume 2: late Iron Age to Roman finds reports	2011	Oxford Wessex Archaeology Monograph
Settling the Ebbsfleet Valley: High Speed 1 excavations at Springhead and Northfleet, Kent, the late Iron Age, Roman, Saxon and medieval landscape. Volume 3: late Iron Age to Roman human remains and environmental reports	2011	Oxford Wessex Archaeology Monograph
Settling the Ebbsfleet Valley: High Speed 1 excavations at Springhead and Northfleet, Kent, the late Iron Age, Roman, Saxon and medieval landscape. Volume 4: Saxon and later finds and environmental reports	2011	Oxford Wessex Archaeology Monograph
On Track: the archaeology of High Speed 1 Section 1 in Kent	2011	Oxford Archaeology Monograph
The Thames through time: the archaeology of the gravel terraces of the Upper and Middle Thames. Early prehistory to 1500 BC	2011	Thames Valley Landscapes
The Anglo-Saxon Cemetery at Butler's Field, Lechlade, Gloucestershire. Volume 2: the Anglo-Saxon grave goods, specialist reports, phasing and discussion	2011	Thames Valley Landscapes
Cirencester before Corinium: excavations at Kingshill North, Cirencester, Gloucestershire	2011	Thames Valley Landscapes
Yarnton: Iron Age and Romano-British Settlement and Landscape. Results of Excavations 1990-98	2011	Thames Valley Landscapes
Cockermouth, Cumbria: archaeological investigation of three burgage plots in Main Street	2012	Cumbria Archaeological Research Report
Extraordinary inundations of the sea: excavations at Market Mews, Wisbech	2012	East Anglian Archaeology Report
Cairns, fields and cultivation: archaeological landscapes of the Lake District uplands	2012	Lancaster Imprints
A road through the past: archaeological discoveries on the A2 Pepperhill to Cobham road-scheme in Kent	2012	Oxford Archaeology Monograph
Landscape and prehistory of the east London Wetlands: investigations along the A13 DBFO road scheme, Tower Hamlets, Newham and Barking and Dagenham, 2000-2003	2012	Oxford Archaeology Monograph
London Gateway: Iron Age and Roman salt making in the Thames Estuary. Excavation at Stanford Wharf Nature Reserve, Essex	2012	Oxford Archaeology Monograph
Longbridge Deverill Cow Down: An Early Iron Age Settlement in West Wiltshire	2012	Oxford University School of Archaeology Monograph
A late Saxon village and medieval manor: excavations at Botolph Bridge, Orton Longueville, Peterborough, 1987 and 1999-2000	2013	East Anglian Archaeology Report
The wetlands of south west Lancashire	2013	Lancaster Imprints
Early landscapes of West and North Yorkshire: archaeological investigation along the Asselby To Pannal Natural Gas Pipeline 2007-8	2013	Lancaster Imprints
Scots Dyke to Turnpike: the archaeology of the A66, Greta Bridge to Scotch Corner	2013	Lancaster Imprints
The Iron Age and Roman landscape of Marston Vale: investigations along the A421 Improvements, M1 Junction 13 to Bedford	2013	Oxford Archaeology Monograph
The Ebbsfleet elephant: excavations at Southfleet Road, Swanscombe in advance of High Speed 1, 2003-4	2013	Oxford Archaeology Monograph
Thames Holocene: A geoarchaeological approach to the investigation of the river floodplain for High Speed 1, 1994–2003	2013	Oxford Wessex Archaeology Monograph
Under the Oracle: excavations at the Oracle Shopping Centre site 1996-8. The medieval and post-medieval urban development of the Kennet floodplain in Reading	2013	Thames Valley Landscapes
Prehistoric settlement in the Lower Kennet Valley: excavations at Green Park (Reading Business Park) Phase 3 and Moores Farm, Burghfield, Berkshire	2013	Thames Valley Landscapes
Opening the wood, making the Land: the Archaeology of a Middle Thames Landscape. The Eton College Rowing Course Project and the Maidenhead, Windsor and Eton Flood Alleviation Scheme. Volume 1: Mesolithic to early Bronze Age	2013	Thames Valley Landscapes
Excavations at Zeugma conducted by Oxford Archaeology	2013	The Packard Humanities Institute
Given to the Ground’: a Viking-age mass grave on Ridgeway Hill, Weymouth	2014	Dorset Natural History and Archaeological Society Monograph
‘Down to Weymouth town by Ridgeway’: prehistoric, Roman and later sites along the Weymouth Relief Road	2014	Dorset Natural History and Archaeological Society Monograph
Shadows in the sand: excavation of a Viking-Age cemetery at Cumwhitton	2014	Lancaster Imprints
Archaeology at the waterfront. Volume 1: Liverpool Docks	2014	Lancaster Imprints
The archaeology of Banbury Flood Alleviation Scheme, Oxfordshire: Neolithic and Roman occupation in the Cherwell Valley	2014	Oxford Archaeology Monograph
Broughton, Milton Keynes, Buckinghamshire: the evolution of south Midlands landscape	2014	Oxford Archaeology Monograph
Remember me to all': the archaeological recovery and identification of soldiers who fought and died in the Battle of Fromelles, 1916	2014	Oxford Archaeology Monograph
Solent-Thames research framework for the historic environment: resource assessments and research agendas	2014	Oxford Wessex Archaeology Monograph
Penrith: the historic core. Excavation and standing building surveys	2015	Cumbria Archaeological Research Report
Excavations along the M25: prehistoric, Roman and Anglo-Saxon activity between Aveley and Epping, Essex	2015	Essex Society for Archaeology and History Occasional Papers
Digging at the Gateway: archaeological landscape of South Thanet. The archaeology of East Kent Access (Phase II). Volume 1: the sites	2015	Oxford Wessex Archaeology Monograph
Digging at the Gateway: archaeological landscape of South Thanet. The archaeology of East Kent Access (Phase II). Volume 2: the finds, environmental and dating reports	2015	Oxford Wessex Archaeology Monograph
The changing face of London: historic buildings and the Crossrail route	2016	Crossrail Archaeology Series
From Brunel to British Rail: the railway heritage of the Crossrail route	2016	Crossrail Archaeology Series
New frontier: the origins and development of West London	2016	Crossrail Archaeology Series
The production and distribution of medieval pottery in Cambridgeshire	2016	East Anglian Archaeology Series
Lost landscapes of Palaeolithic Britain	2016	Oxford Archaeology Monograph
A Roman villa and other Iron Age and Roman discoveries at Bredon's Norton, Fiddington and Pamington along the Gloucester Security of Supply pipeline	2016	Oxford Archaeology Monograph
Yarnton: Neolithic and Bronze Age settlement and landscape	2016	Thames Valley Landscapes
From Blackfriars to Bankside: medieval and later riverfront archaeology along the route of Thameslink, central London	2016	Thameslink Monograph
The Horningsea Roman pottery industry in context	2017	East Anglian Archaeology Series
From bridgehead to brewery: the medieval and post-medieval archaeological remains from Finzel's Reach, Bristol	2017	Oxford Archaeology Monograph
Horcott Quarry, Fairford and Arkell's Land, Kempsford: prehistoric, Roman and Anglo-Saxon settlement and burial in the Upper Thames Valley in Gloucestershire	2017	Thames Valley Landscapes
Living and dying in Southwark 1587-1831: excavations at Cure's College Burial Ground, Park Street	2017	Thameslink Monograph
Footprints from the past. The south-eastern extra-mural settlement of Roman Alchester and rural occupation in its hinterland: The archaeology of East West Rail Phase 1	2018	Oxford Archaeology Monograph
Excavations at Wixoe Roman small town, Suffolk	2018	East Anglian Archaeology Series
Gill Mill. Later prehistoric landscape and a Roman nucleated settlement in the lower Windrush Valley near Witney, Oxfordshire	2018	Thames Valley Landscapes
From Mesolithic encampment to medieval estate: The archaeology of the Bay Gateway	2018	Lancaster Imprints
Woodford, the archaeology of a landscape and aerodrome	2018	Greater Manchester’s Past Revealed
Architecture, burial and reform: the Upper Brook Street Unitarian chapel, Manchester	2018	Greater Manchester’s Past Revealed
Conquering the claylands: Excavations at Love’s Farm, St Neots, Cambridgeshire	2018	East Anglian Archaeology series
In the shadow of Corinium: Prehistoric and Roman occupation at Kingshill South, Cirencester, Gloucestershire	2018	Thames Valley Landscapes
Berryfields. Iron Age settlement and a Roman bridge, field system and settlement along Akeman Street near Fleet Marston, Buckinghamshire	2019	Oxford Archaeology Monograph
Torre Abbey, Devon: The archaeology of the Premonstratensian abbey	2019	Oxford Archaeology Monograph
Cutacre. Excavating a prehistoric, medieval and post-medieval landscape	2019	Greater Manchester’s Past Revealed
Yeoman farmers and handloom weavers: the archaeology of the Kingsway Business Park	2019	Greater Manchester’s Past Revealed
Rectory Farm, Godmanchester: excavations 1988–1995, Neolithic monument to Roman villa farm	2019	East Anglian Archaeology Series
Excavations at Oxford Castle 1999–2009	2019	Thames Valley Landscapes
A bath house, settlement and industry on Roman Southwark’s North Island. Excavations along the route of Thameslink Borough Viaduct and at London Bridge Station	2019	OAPCA Thameslink Monograph
Roman and medieval Carlisle: the northern Lanes, excavations 1978 82. Volume 1: the Roman period	2019	Lancaster Imprints
St Michael's Church, Workington, excavation of an early medieval cemetery	2019	Lancaster Imprints
Brothers Minor: Lancashire's Lost Franciscans: Investigations at Preston Friary 1991 and 2007	2020	Lancaster Imprints
Excavations at Stoke Quay, Ipswich. Southern Gipeswic and the parish of St Augustine	2020	East Anglian Archaeology Series
The archaeology of Oxford in the 21st century: Investigations in the city by Oxford Archaeology, 2006-2016	2020	Oxfordshire Architectural and Historical Society Occasional Paper
Bridging the past: Life in medieval and post-medieval Southwark. Excavations along the route of Thameslink Borough Viaduct and at London Bridge Station	2020	OAPCA Thameslink Monograph
Prehistoric Ebbsfleet: Excavations and research in advance of High Speed 1 and South Thameside Development Route 4, 1989-2003	2020	Oxford Wessex Archaeology Monograph
The Castle Hill Brickworks and Somerhill Estate. Post-medieval discoveries on the A21 Tonbridge-to-Pembury Dualling Scheme, Kent	2021	Oxford Archaeology Monograph
London Gateway. Settlement, farming and industry from prehistory to the present in the Thames Estuary. Archaeological investigations at DP World London Gateway Port and Logistics Park, Essex, and on the Hoo Peninsula, Kent	2021	Oxford Archaeology Monograph
Farmers and Weavers: Investigation at Kingsway Business Park and Cutacre Country Park, Greater Manchester	2021	Lancaster Imprints
The patients’ story. Dr Radcliffe's legacy in the age of hospitals. Excavations at the 18th–19th century Radcliffe Infirmary Burial Ground, Oxford	2022	Oxford Archaeology Monograph
The early medieval monastic site at Dacre, Cumbria	2022	Lancaster Imprints
Harpole: The landscape of a Roman villa at Panattoni Park, Northamptonshire	2022	Oxford Archaeology Monograph
Roman and medieval Carlisle. The Northern Lanes, volume two: The medieval and post-medieval periods	2022	Lancaster Imprints

Publications include Yarnton: Iron Age and Romano-British Settlement and Landscape, which describes the Iron Age and Roman occupation of a multi-period landscape on the floodplain and gravel terrace of the River Thames, Archaeology at the Waterfront: 1: Investigating Liverpool's Historic Docks, which presents the findings of the largest campaign of archaeological investigation yet undertaken along Liverpool's historic waterfront by Oxford Archaeology North and the National Museums Liverpool Field Archaeology Unit, ‘Remember me to all’: The archaeological recovery and identification of soldiers who fought and died in the Battle of Fromelles, 1916, which describes Oxford Archaeology's contribution to a joint Australian and British government mission, under the management of the Commonwealth War Graves Commission, to recover the soldiers and re-bury them with full military honours in a new Commonwealth War Graves cemetery in Fromelles, and Broughton, Milton Keynes, Buckinghamshire: The evolution of a South Midlands landscape, which reports on extensive excavations near the village of Broughton on the outskirts of Milton Keynes that revealed the fluctuating fortunes of neighbouring settlements from the Iron Age to the medieval period.

Oxford Archaeology has contributed many archaeology reports and research papers to county, national and period archaeological journals.

In addition, as part of its commitment to open access for archaeological data, Oxford Archaeology has developed the Knowledge Hub, an online resource used to disseminate digital material, including ‘grey literature’ client reports grey literature online, monographs, and supporting archives produced by Oxford Archaeology. It also makes available internally developed software on the Launchpad site under the umbrella project Open Archaeology.

== Archaeological survey ==
Oxford Archaeology has incorporated digital survey techniques into its geomatics work. The most notable of these techniques is photogrammetric mapping, which uses photographs taken from an unmanned aerial vehicle (UAV) to create accurate three-dimensional models of the archaeological evidence, including artefacts, historic buildings or whole landscapes. Other techniques for data capture include differential RTK GPS, 3D laser scanning, Lidar and Total Station surveys.

During excavations by OA at Westgate Oxford, the site of a medieval Greyfriars friary, three-dimensional models were generated through a combination of standard archaeological survey techniques and photogrammetric or structure from motion techniques. Photogrammetry and 3D modelling has not been confined to structures. The skeletons from a late Roman and Saxon cemetery at Cherry Hinton in Cambridge, excavated by OA's Cambridge office, were recorded using photogrammetry. UAVs have been used by OA's Lancaster office to map extensive landscapes, such as the former Greenside lead mine in the Lake District. The combination of a UAV, photogrammetry and detailed orthophotos captured the complex lead mining landscape, which comprised spoil heaps, mine shafts, wheel pits, engine houses, and trackways, among other remains. Oxford Archaeology uses a hand-held laser scanner that has an inertial measurement unit (IMU) and a small scanner mounted on top. These features allow the scanner to fix its location precisely and the surveyor to record the interior of a building in as much time as it takes to walk through it. Combining photogrammetry with the laser scanner also allows whole buildings to be recorded in 3D. The Lancaster office has employed the hand-held laser scanner to record Daisy Mill, a former Victorian cotton mill in south Manchester, and Lion Mill, a corn mill in Stonyhurst in Lancashire.

== Charitable aims and outreach ==
A registered charitable trust with educational aims, OA has various outreach and community archaeology projects running alongside its commercial work. All three offices engage in outreach and public engagement, with a particular focus at OA's Cambridge office. Recent highlights include the volunteer dig at Maryport Roman settlement and the Jigsaw Cambridgeshire project which trains and supports local archaeology societies across Cambridgeshire
