= Queen Street, Oxford =

Pedestrianised shopping street in Oxford, England

Coordinates: 51.7515°N 1.259°W

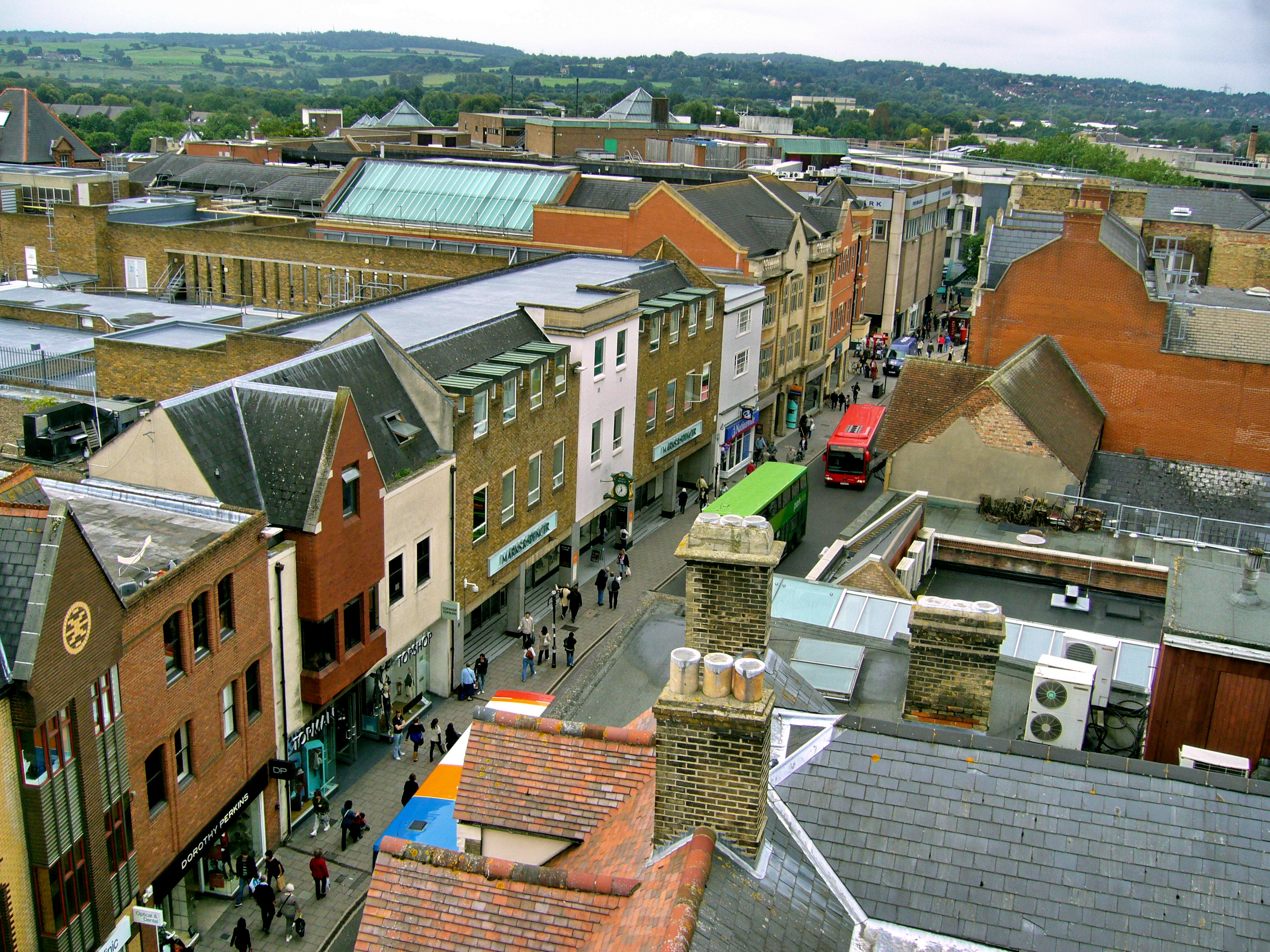
View of Queen Street from Carfax Tower

Queen Street is a pedestrianised shopping street in central Oxford, England. It is one-way (west to east) for buses and taxis, two-way for cyclists outside main shopping hours, and forbidden for cars. It runs west from the centre of Oxford at Carfax. Here it adjoins Cornmarket Street to the north (also pedestrianised), the High Street continuing east, and St Aldate's to the south.

Halfway along on the north side is an entrance to the Clarendon Centre, a shopping centre. At the western end is Bonn Square, named after the German city of Bonn with which Oxford is twinned, and the Westgate Oxford shopping centre, where the old city gate to the west used to be located. New Inn Hall Street leads north from near here. Close by is the mound of Oxford Castle and the former Oxford Prison off New Road, which leads on to the west towards the Oxford railway station.

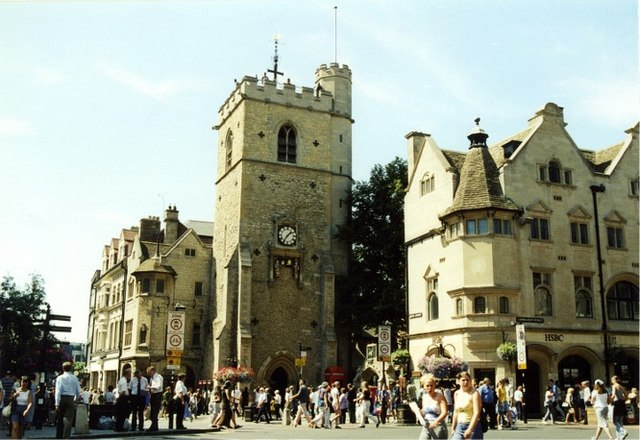
Carfax Tower at the eastern end of Queen Street on the left

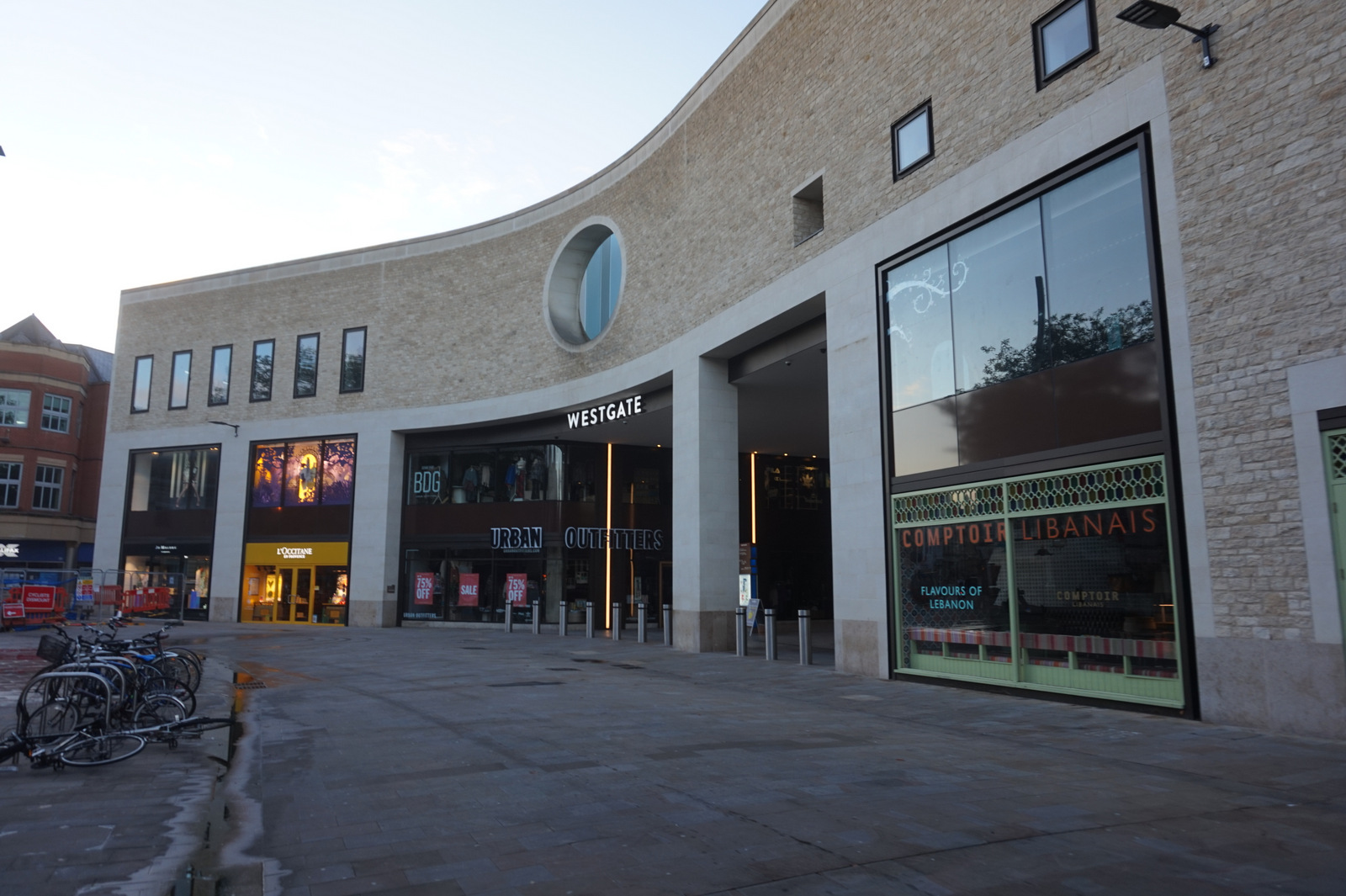
Westgate Oxford shopping centre at the western end of Queen Street

In the 13th century, the street was known as the Bailey due to its proximity to the castle. Cattle were slaughtered and the meat sold here, so the street later became known as Butcher Row. The slaughtering of animals in the street was outlawed by the Oxford Mileways Act 1771 (11 Geo. 3. c. 19) and the butchers moved to the Covered Market. The street was then named Queen Street after Queen Charlotte, who visited Oxford with her husband, King George III, in 1785. There were many gabled and timber-framed buildings here until the late 19th century. Until 1932, there was a showroom for Morris Garages in the street. In 1970, the street was pedestrianised. The buildings have mostly been replaced with modern stores, such as the Marks & Spencer shop on the south side of the street, built in 1975–8.
