= Bracher =

Bracher is a surname. Notable people with the surname include:

- Barbara Kay Bracher (maiden name) (1955–2001), lawyer and conservative American television commentator
- Chris Bracher, three time world champion BriSCA race car driver
- Clemens Bracher (born 1987), Swiss bobsledder
- Edward Bracher (1823–1887), English Victorian photographer based in Oxford
- Elisa Bracher (born 1965), Brazilian artist
- Hermann Bracher (1895–1974), highly decorated German Oberst in the Wehrmacht during World War II
- Karl Dietrich Bracher (1922–2016), German political scientist and author
- Rose Bracher (1894–1941), British botanist

== See also ==
- Bracher Elementary School, Santa Clara, CA, US
- Bracher Park, Santa Clara, CA, US
- Bracher Pocket Park, Spring Branch, Texas, US
- Erich Bracher School, Ludwigsburg, Baden-Württemberg, Germany
