= Queen's Lane =

Street in Central Oxford, England

Coordinates: 51.754°N 1.251°W

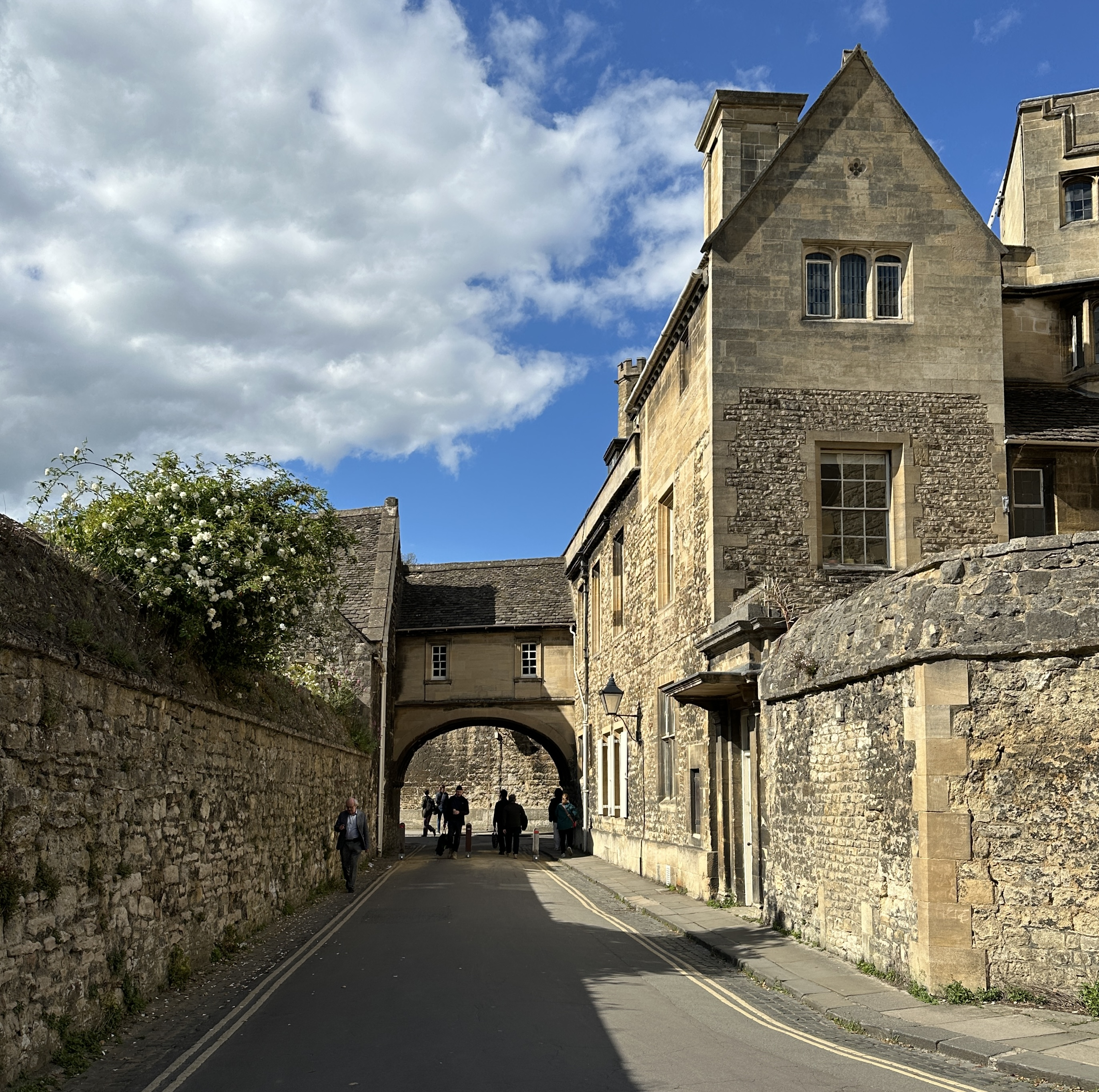
View of the covered bridge on Queen's Lane near the junction with New College Lane.

Queen's Lane is a historic street in central Oxford, England, named after Queen's College, to the south and west. St Edmund Hall, a constituent college of the University of Oxford, is located on the southern end of this street.

== Location ==
At the southeastern end of Queen's Lane is a junction onto the High Street. To the west is Queen's College, and to the east, on the corner, is the Queen's Lane Coffee House, a historic coffee house dating from 1654. It has been claimed (along with others) to be the oldest in Oxford.

Just north of the Queen's Lane Coffee House, on the eastern side of the lane, is the main entrance to St Edmund Hall. The 12th-century church of St Peter-in-the-East, which was deconsecrated in the 1970s and is now the library of St Edmund Hall, is situated to the north of the college's entrance.

There is a bend in the lane about halfway along, following the boundaries of the surrounding colleges. The lane is largely surrounded by high stone walls with few windows, but with some good examples of gargoyles, a feature of Oxford college architecture.

At the north-western end, the lane continues as New College Lane, named after New College to the north of Queen's Lane. There is a barrier in the road at this point to prevent through traffic.

== History ==
The part of the lane near the High Street was formerly called St Edmund Hall Lane in the 18th century. Past the bend at the middle of the current Queen's Lane it was called Torald Street. By 1772, both of these became known by the present name of Queen's Lane.

== Gallery ==
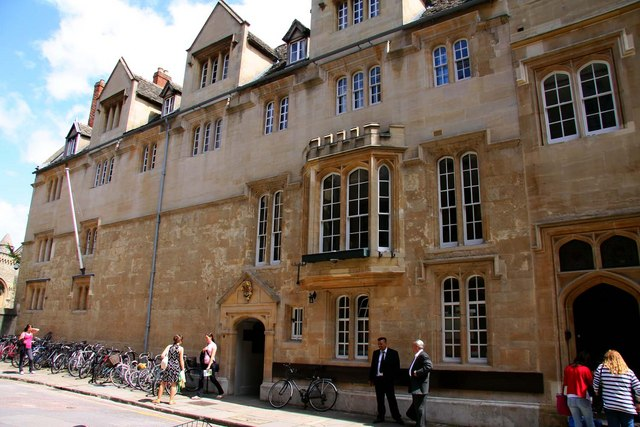
The entrance to St Edmund Hall, as seen from Queen's Lane.

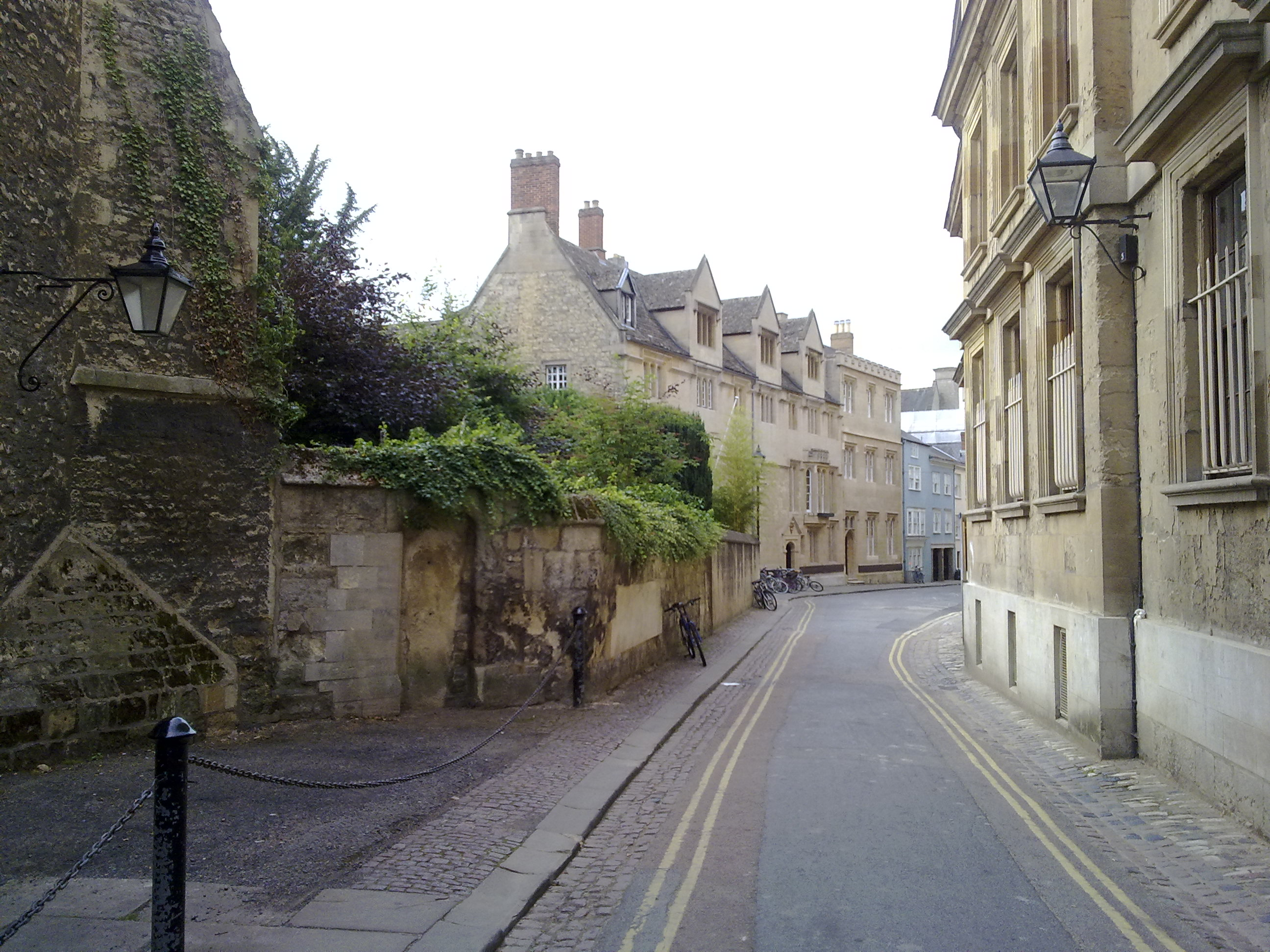
Queen's Lane, looking south, just short of High Street, Oxford.

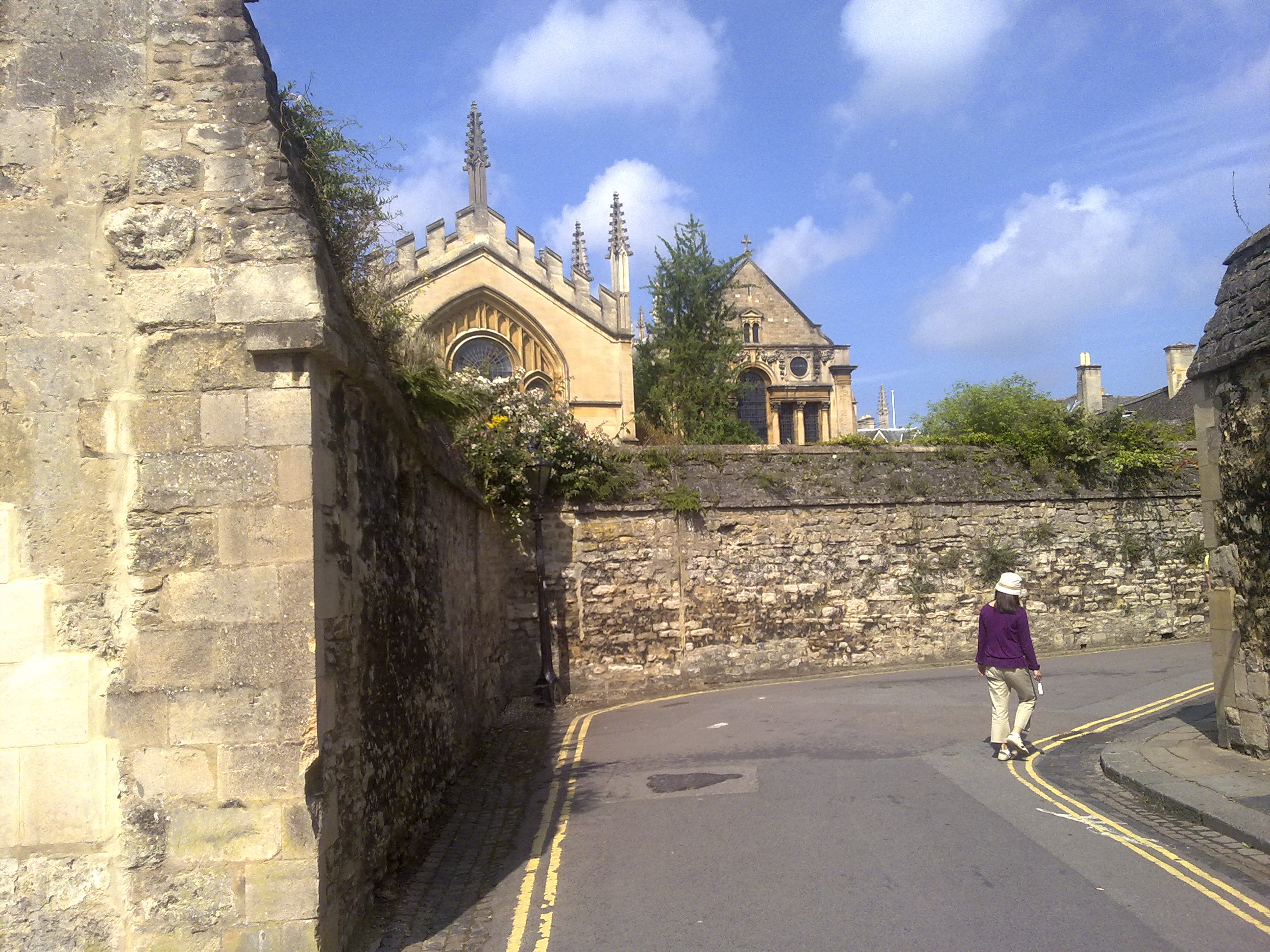
Queen's Lane, heading north, about to turn into New College Lane, looking towards All Souls College.

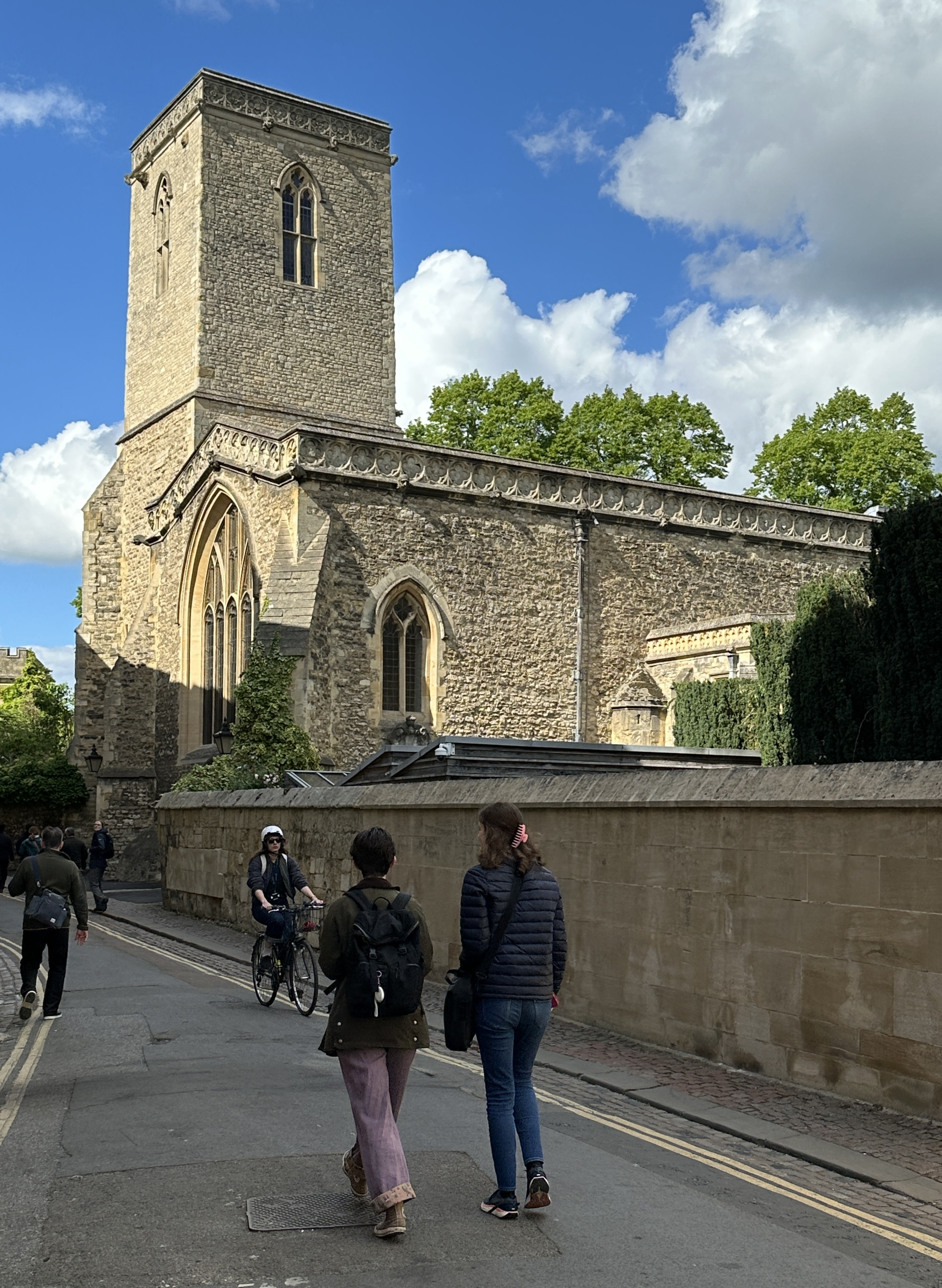
St Peter-in-the-East on Queen's Lane
