= St Peter-in-the-East =

Coordinates: 51.7535°N 1.2501°W

- Parish Church of St Peter-in-the-East
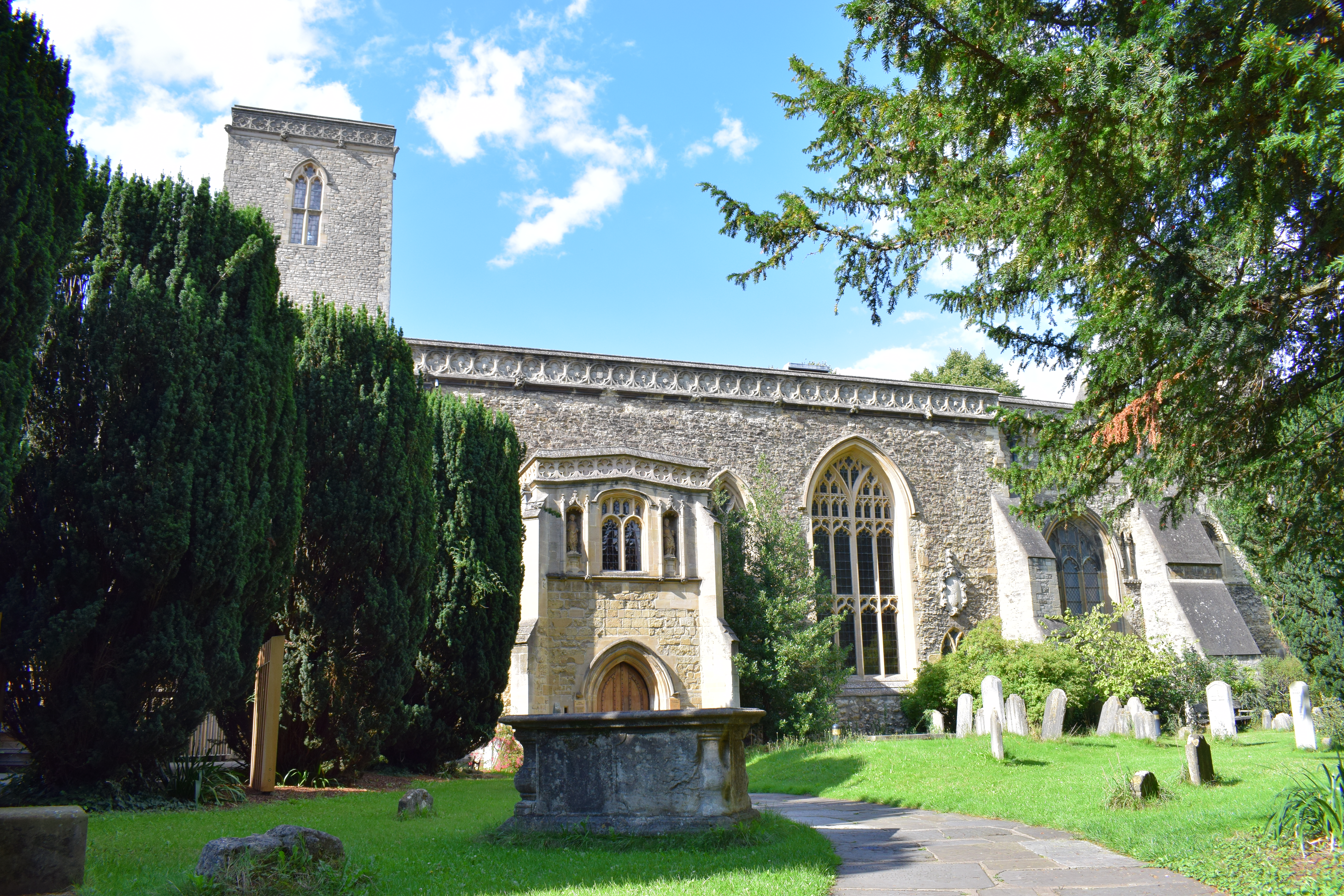
- St Peter-in-the-East, now St Edmund Hall library
- St Peter-in-the-East
- OS grid reference: SP 51857 06365
- Location: Queen's Lane, Oxford
- Country: England
- Denomination: Church of England
- Website: St Edmund Hall Oxford

Architecture
- Style: Norman, Perpendicular Gothic
- Years built: 12th century

Administration
- Diocese: Oxford

St Peter-in-the-East is a 12th-century church on Queen's Lane, north of the High Street in central Oxford, England. It is now deconsecrated and houses the college library of St Edmund Hall. The churchyard to the north is laid out as a garden and contains a seated bronze statue depicting St Edmund as an impoverished student.

== History ==
A church has existed on the current site since the late 10th century. In the 11th century, it was replaced by a stone church, which is mentioned in the Domesday Book of c. 1085:

the church of St. Peter Oxenford holds of Robert two hides in Haliwelle...It was worth twenty shillings, now it is worth forty...

The church is believed to be named after the 5th-century church of S. Pietro in Vincoli, Rome, Italy. In the early 12th century the church was renamed St-Peter-in-the-East, because of its location near the East Gate of the walled city of Oxford, to differentiate it from the Church of St Peter-le-Bailey, which was built close to Oxford Castle.

The Norman parts of the current church were built around 1140 by Robert D'Oilly, who was then Governor of Oxford. The church passed to the Crown from D'Oilly's heirs. In 1266, King Henry III gave it to Walter de Merton, and as a consequence Merton College held the advowson for the church. The churches at Wolvercote and Holywell were originally chapels of ease of St Peter's.

In the twentieth century, changes in the demographics of central Oxford, mainly as a result of the First World War, led to a significant decline in the size of the congregation, and the church closed in 1965.

== The present day ==
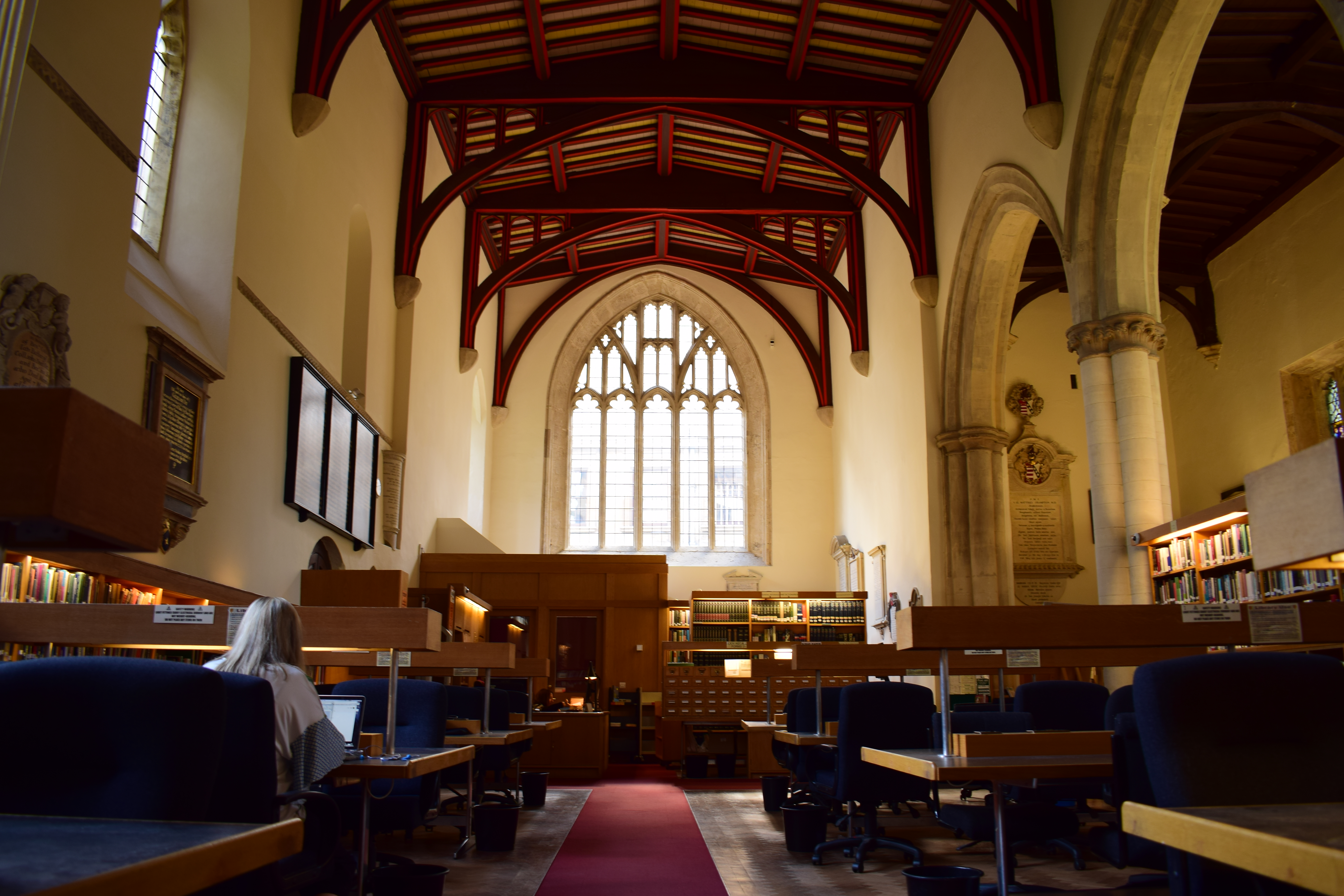
The interior of St Peter-in-the-East, which is now the College Library of St Edmund Hall, University of Oxford

St Peter-in-the-East was deconsecrated in the 1970s and renovated for its present use. The building now serves as the college library of St Edmund Hall.

== Church building ==
The 12th-century church originally consisted of a crypt, chancel, and nave, extending to just beyond the south door. In the 13th century, a north aisle was added to the nave. The church tower was added in the 14th century, and the nave was either heightened or reconstructed to connect with the tower. The windows are mostly 14th-century and the door into the tower is 16th-century. At the east end of the aisle there is a small chapel dedicated to St Catharine and St Thomas, constructed in the early 16th century.

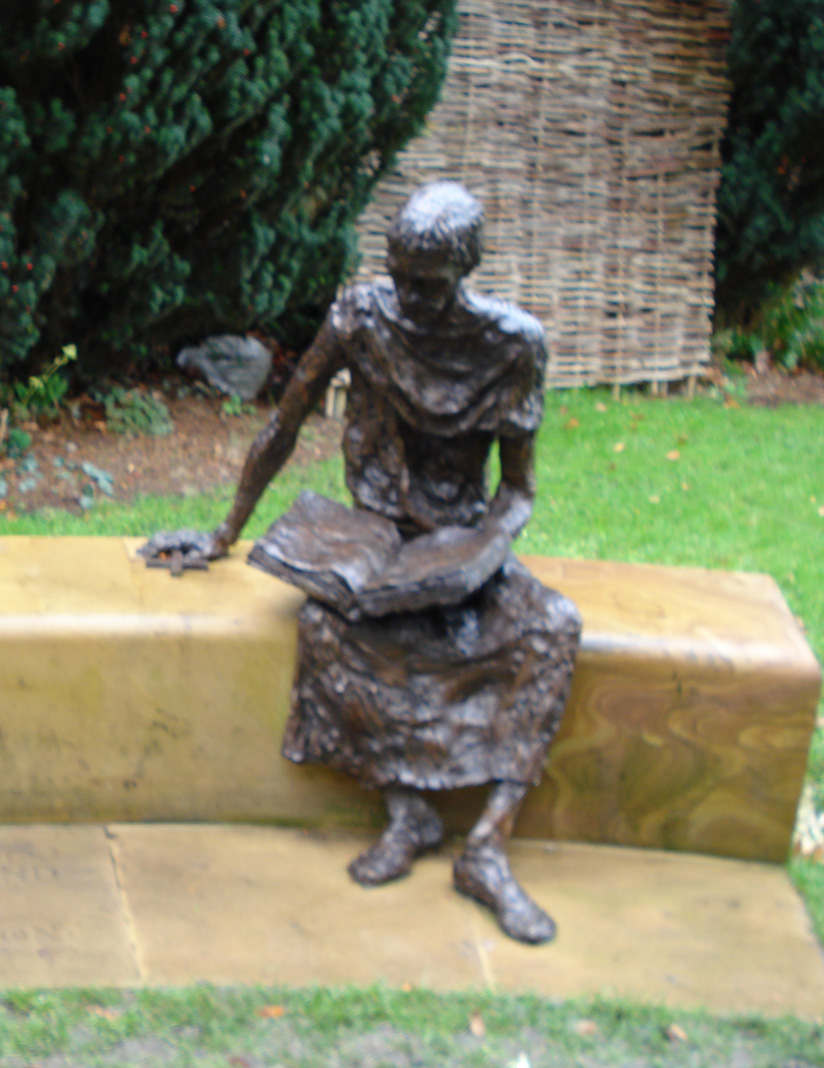
Seated statue of St Edmund of Abingdon in the churchyard.

The Lady Chapel (or North Chapel) was built in the early 13th century. It was donated by Edmund Rich, who later became Archbishop of Canterbury, when he was a resident of the Hall that was subsequently named St Edmund Hall after him. The north window, dating from 1433, was donated by the vicar, Vincent Wyking. It contains some glass from that period and some from the 14th century. The east windows are two 13th-century lancets.

== Gallery ==
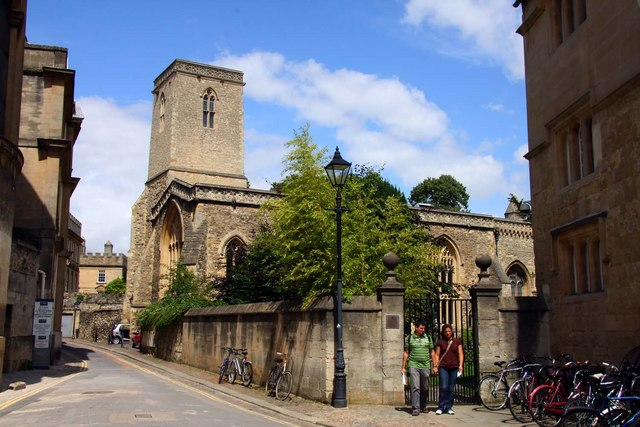
The church, as seen from the Queen's Lane

The Church in the snow

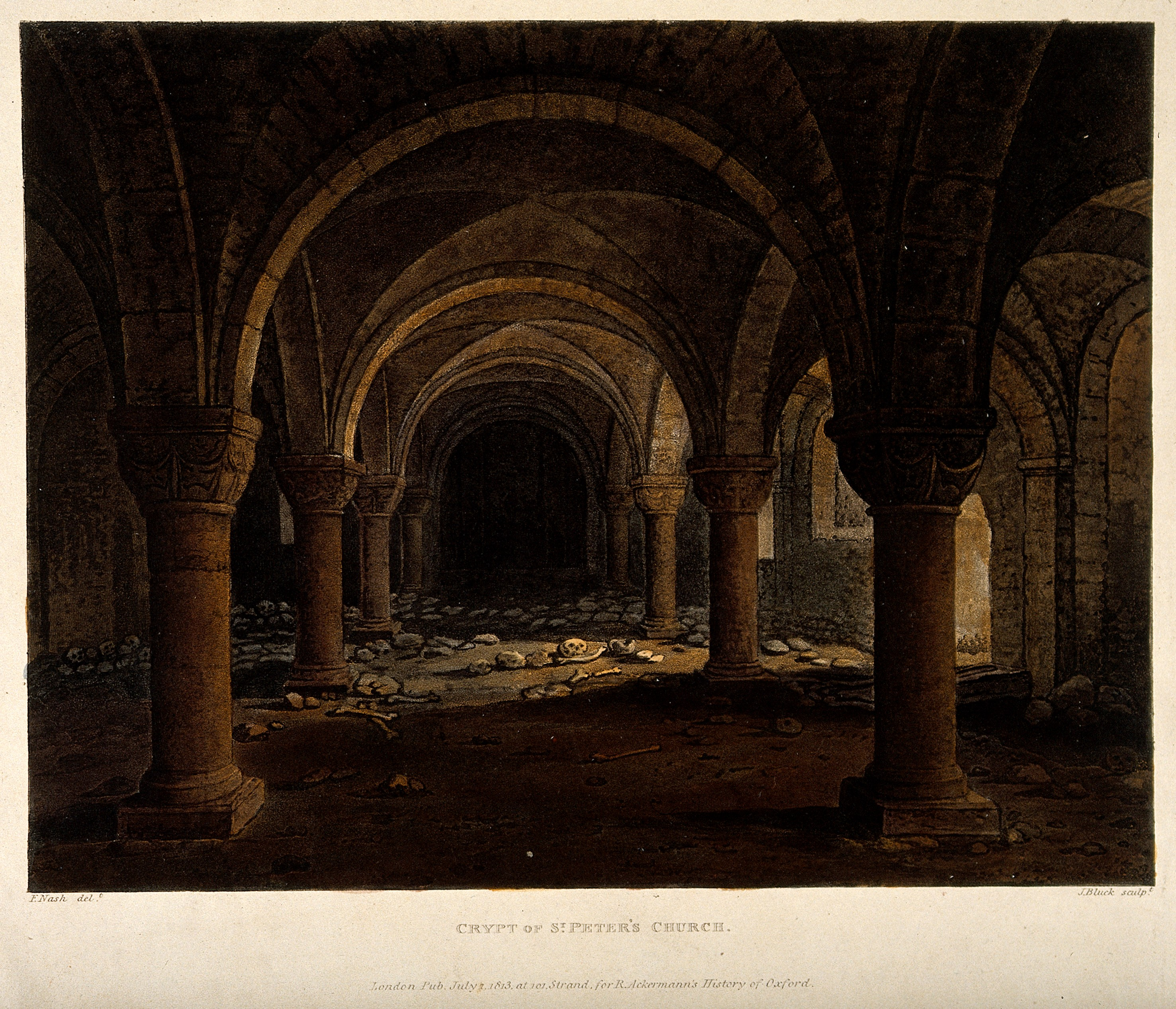
A nineteenth-century drawing of the Norman crypt below St Peter-in-the-East

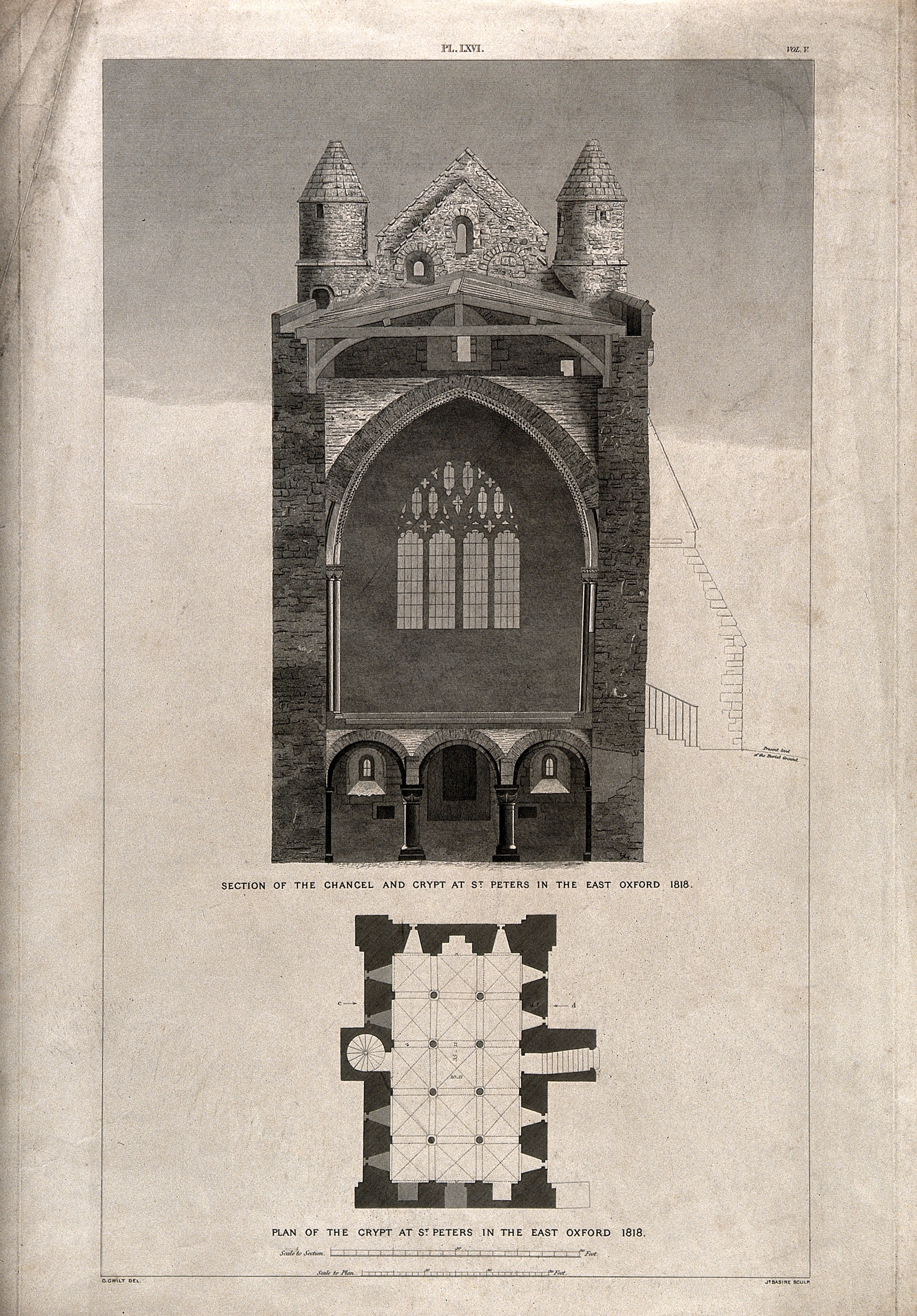
An etching of the side profile of the church, including the crypt below it

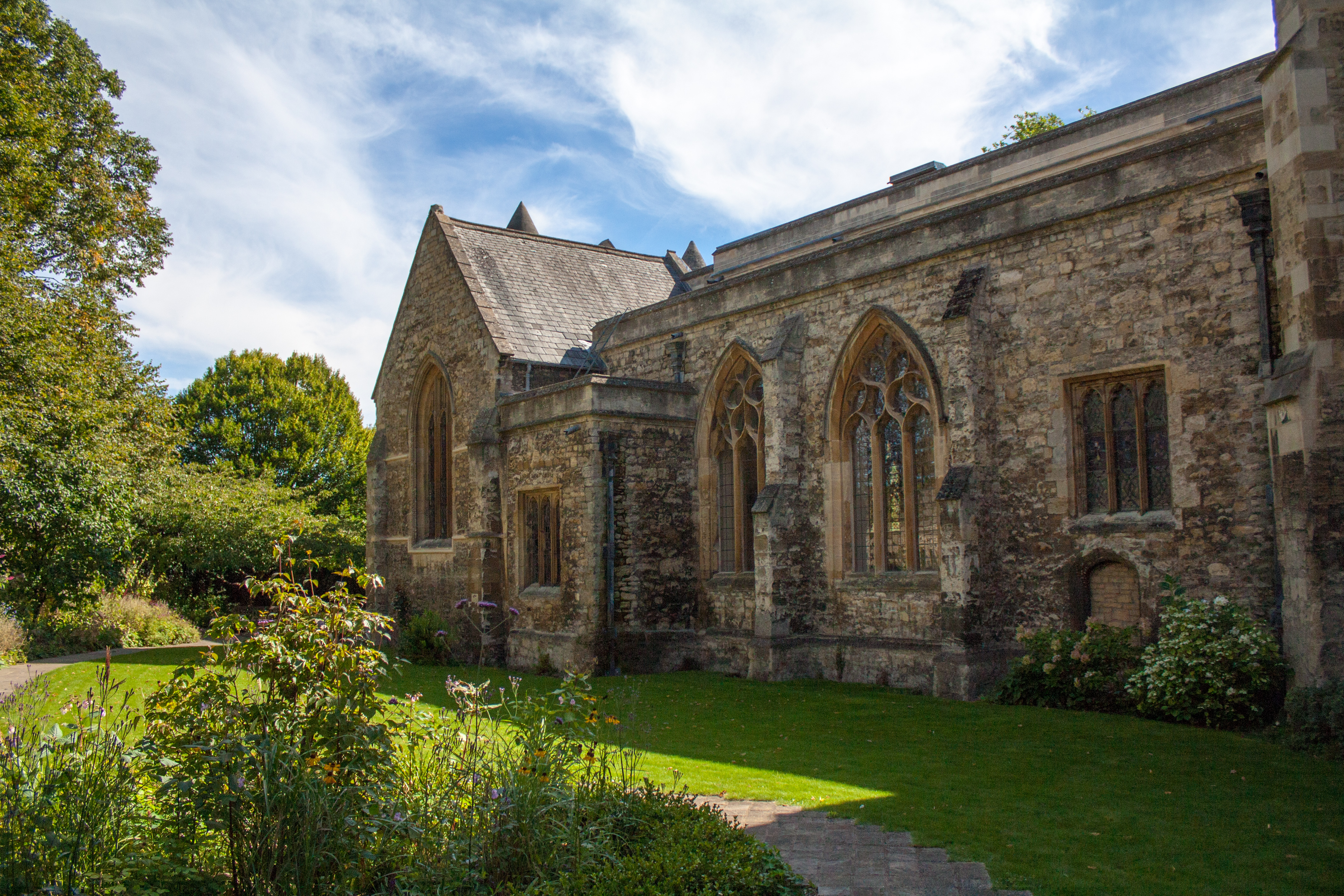
The Broadbent garden, around the back of the church

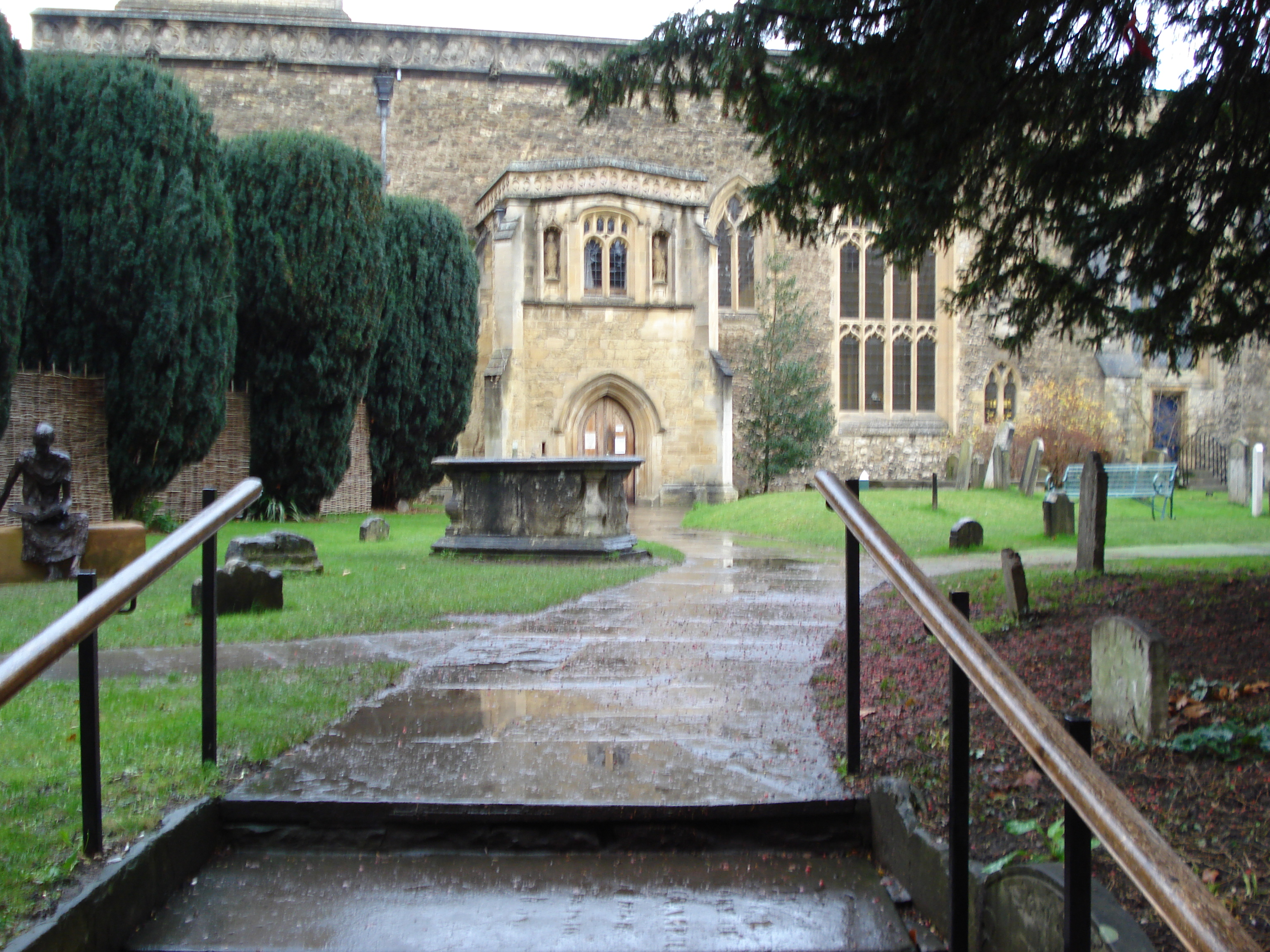
The church and the surrounding gardens

== See also ==
- Peter du Moulin (1601–1684)
- St Peter-le-Bailey, now the chapel of St Peter's College, Oxford
