= Sanders of Oxford =

Antique print shop in Oxford, England

Coordinates: 51.752367°N 1.254287°W

Sanders of Oxford is an antique print shop situated on the High Street of the city of Oxford, England.

Although stores trading in prints were once common in the country, there are now only a handful left, Sanders being one of the largest and longest running outside London. The building, Salutation House, has traded in books and prints since at least the 1840s, when it was registered as a 'Bookseller and Auctioneer & appraiser' by its then proprietor Charles Richards. In the 16th and 17th centuries the building housed the Saluation Inn and Thomas Wood was the proprietor of the Inn. Sanders possesses a token issued by Wood in 1652. The design shows a racket, a reference to the real tennis court at Oriel College. The tavern later became a coffee house kept by James Houseman.

Sanders of Oxford was owned until his death in 2012 by Hon. Christopher Lennox-Boyd, second son of Conservative politician Alan Lennox-Boyd.

== Notable former employees ==
People who have worked at or been part owners of Sanders include:

- Henry Taunt, early photographer.
- Brian Aldiss, science fiction writer.
- Kyril Bonfiglioli, comic mystery writer.
