= Shepherd & Woodward =

Traditional clothing outfitters in Oxford, England

Coordinates: 51.752332°N 1.254968°W

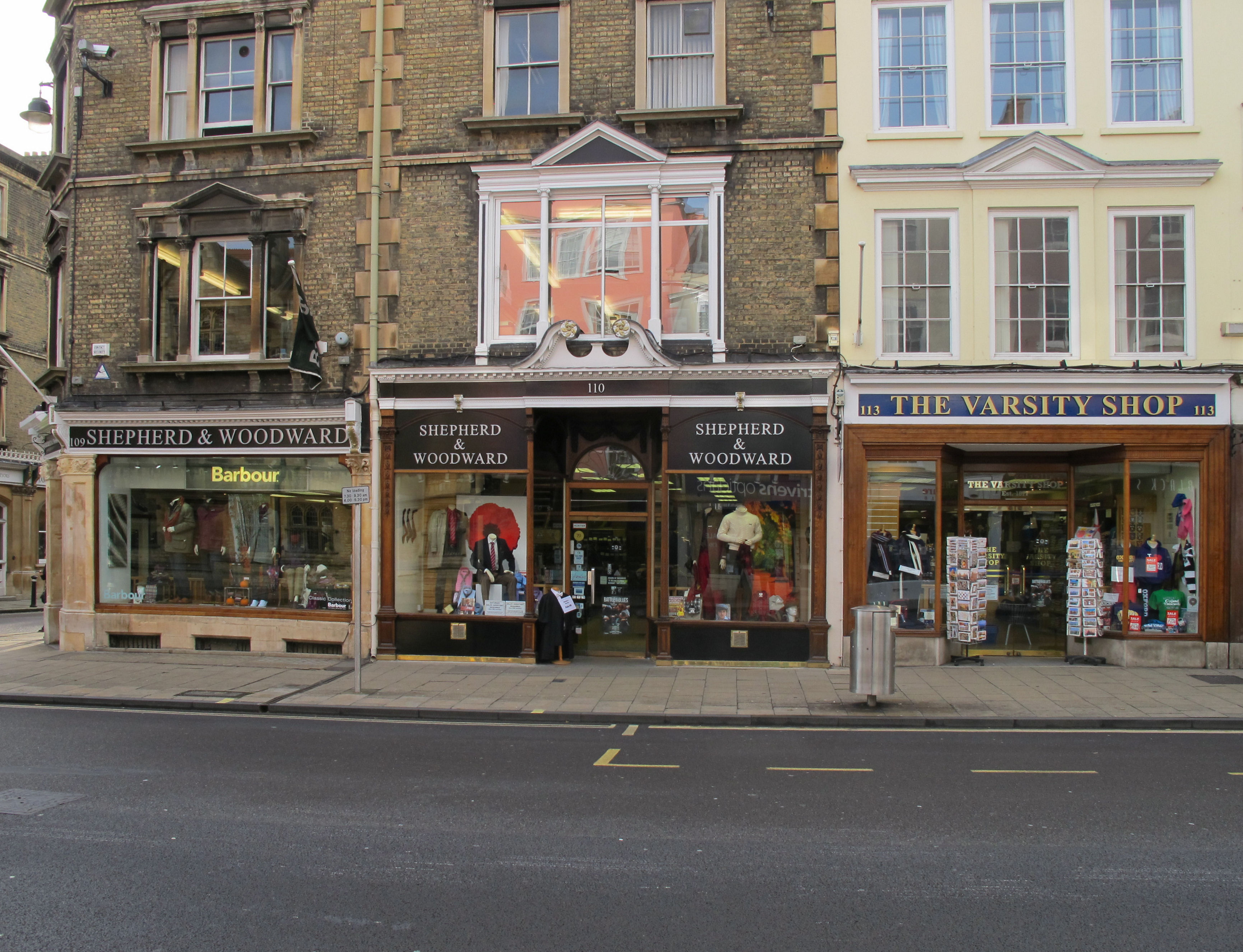
Shepherd & Woodward (left and centre); the Varsity Shop (right)

Shepherd & Woodward are a traditional clothing outfitters in High Street, Oxford, England. The shop's origins date back to 1845. It is the largest supplier of academic gowns and other clothing for the University of Oxford.

The company also runs Walters of Oxford in Turl Street and the Varsity Shop (formerly Castells & Son) which is located within the main High Street premises.

== History ==
The company was set up by Arthur Shepherd, who in 1877 took over the tailor's shop of Arthur Brockington in 62 Cornmarket St, Oxford. After Arthur's death in 1895, his son Ernest took over the business, and in 1902 he opened a branch named Arthur Shepherd in 32 Trinity St, Cambridge under independent management. In 1929 Ernest Shepherd merged his business with Wilton Woodward, and moved their premises, now renamed Shepherd & Woodward, to The High Street.

The current premises at 109–113 High Street were significantly rebuilt between 1932 and 1934, though the Grade II listed building retains original 17th-century fireplaces and internal features. Management of the firm has remained with the Venables family for over three generations. Dennis Venables, who began as an apprentice at the firm in 1927, purchased a share of the partnership in 1945, eventually acquiring the business.

The company acquired the historic Oxford tailor Castell & Son (established 1846), which now trades as 'The Varsity Shop'. Castell & Son is historically credited with introducing the first modern necktie in 1870 and codifying the distinct college colours used for Oxford sports blazers and ties.

The Cambridge branch of the business was eventually sold to its running partner in 1938. It traded under the name of Arthur Shepherd until 2017, when it closed down upon its last owner's retirement.

== Academic dress ==
Shepherd & Woodward is a primary supplier of sub-fusc, the formal attire required by the University of Oxford for matriculation and examinations. The store manufactures and supplies gowns for all levels of the university, from the Commoner's Gown worn by undergraduates to the elaborate Full Dress robes worn by university officials and holders of higher doctorates.
