= The Old Bank Hotel =

Hotel in Oxford, England

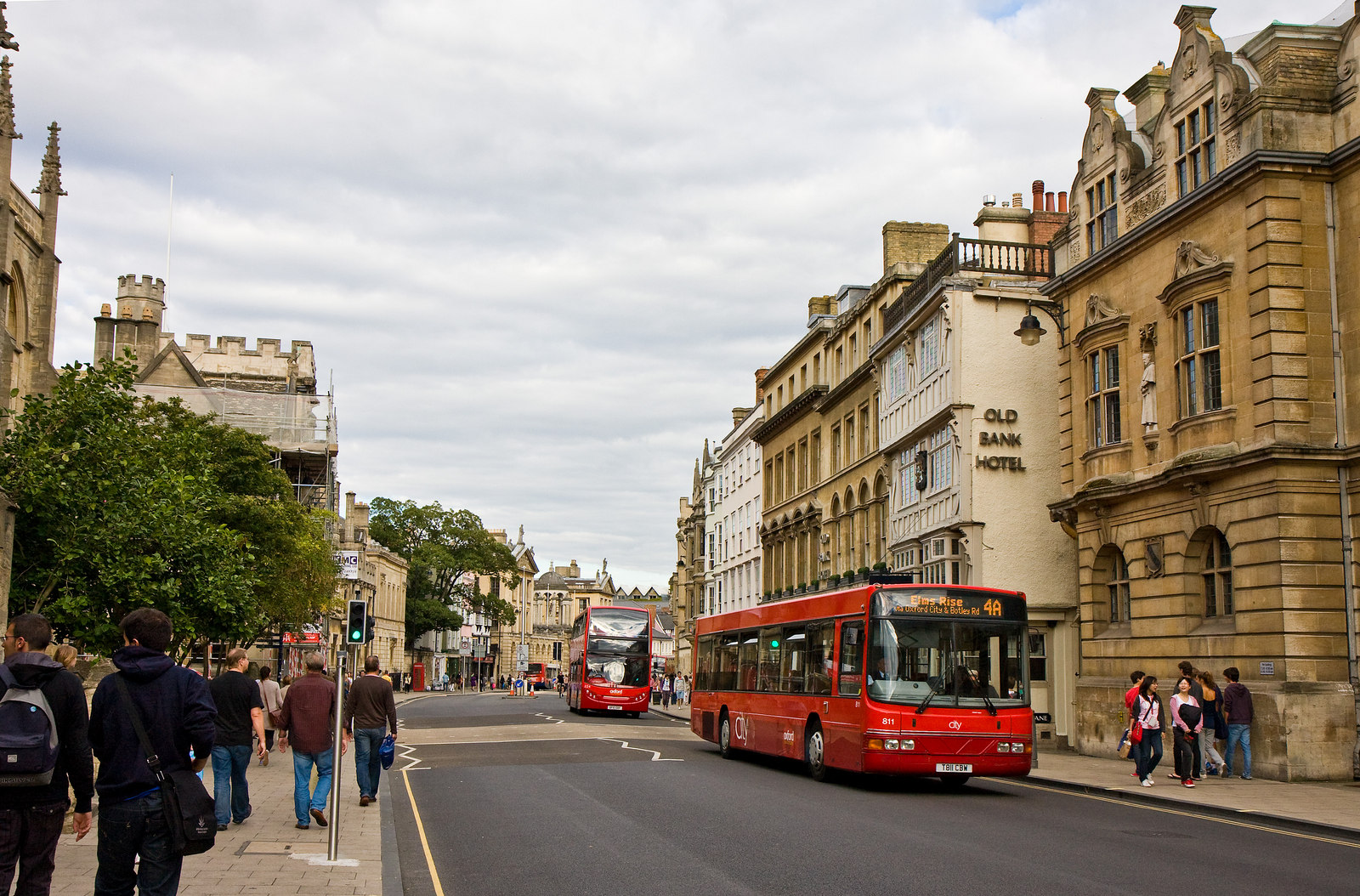
- View of the High Street, Oxford, with the Old Bank Hotel on the right
- Interactive map of the The Old Bank Hotel area

General information
- Location: 91–94 High Street; Oxford OX1 4BJ; England
- Coordinates: 51°45′15″N 1°15′16″W
- Opening: 1998
- Owner: Jeremy Mogford

Other information
- Number of rooms: 42
- Number of restaurants: 2

Website
- OldBankHotel.co.uk

The Old Bank Hotel is a hotel located in the historic university city of Oxford, England. It is located on the south side of Oxford's High Street, where it was the first hotel in 135 years to be created in the city centre.

== Location ==
The Old Bank Hotel and its restaurant Quod are located on the south side of Oxford's High Street. The complex offers a large area to park, access to which is possible via Merton Street and Magpie Lane.

== History ==
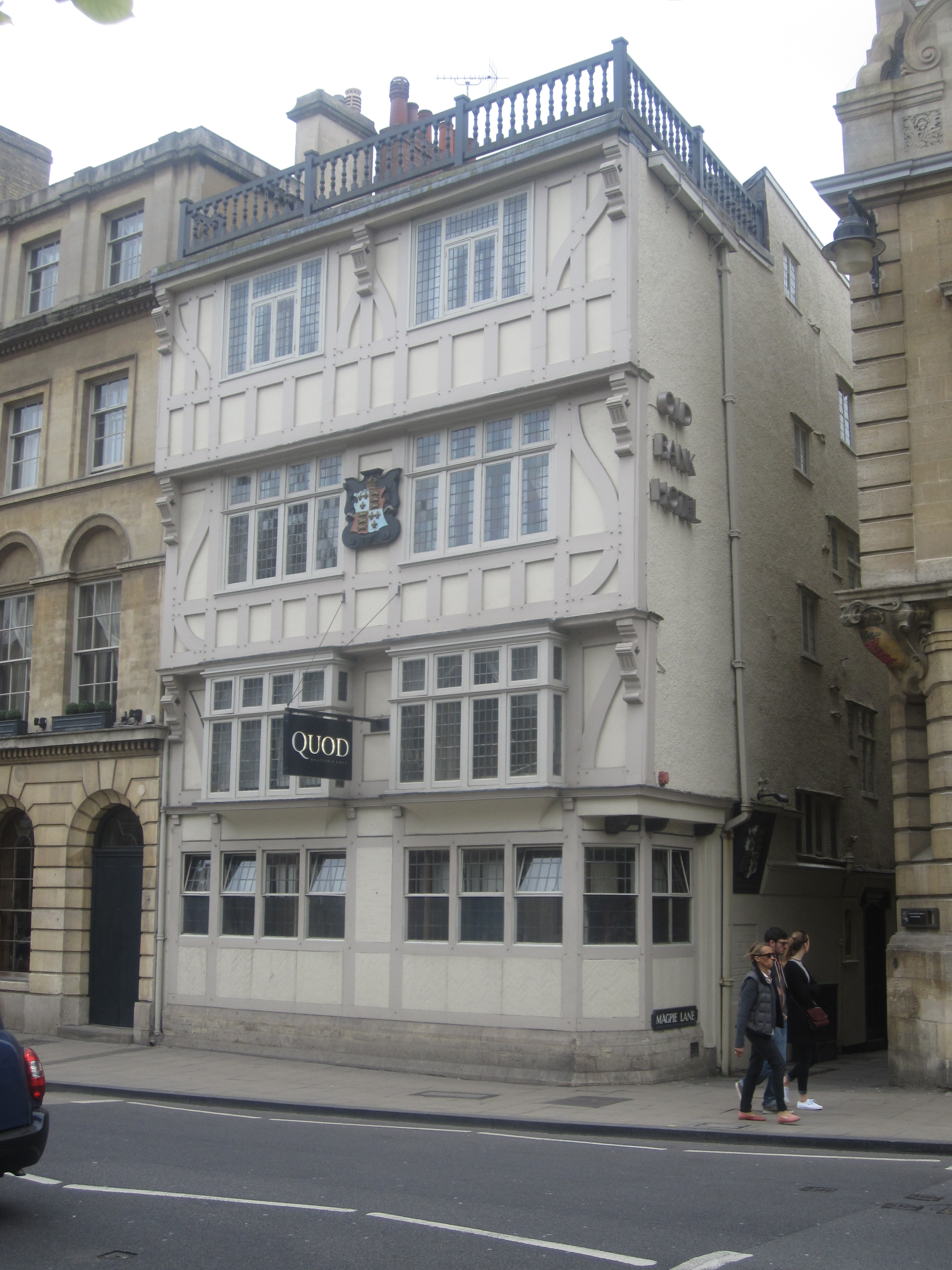
94 High Street on the corner with Magpie Lane

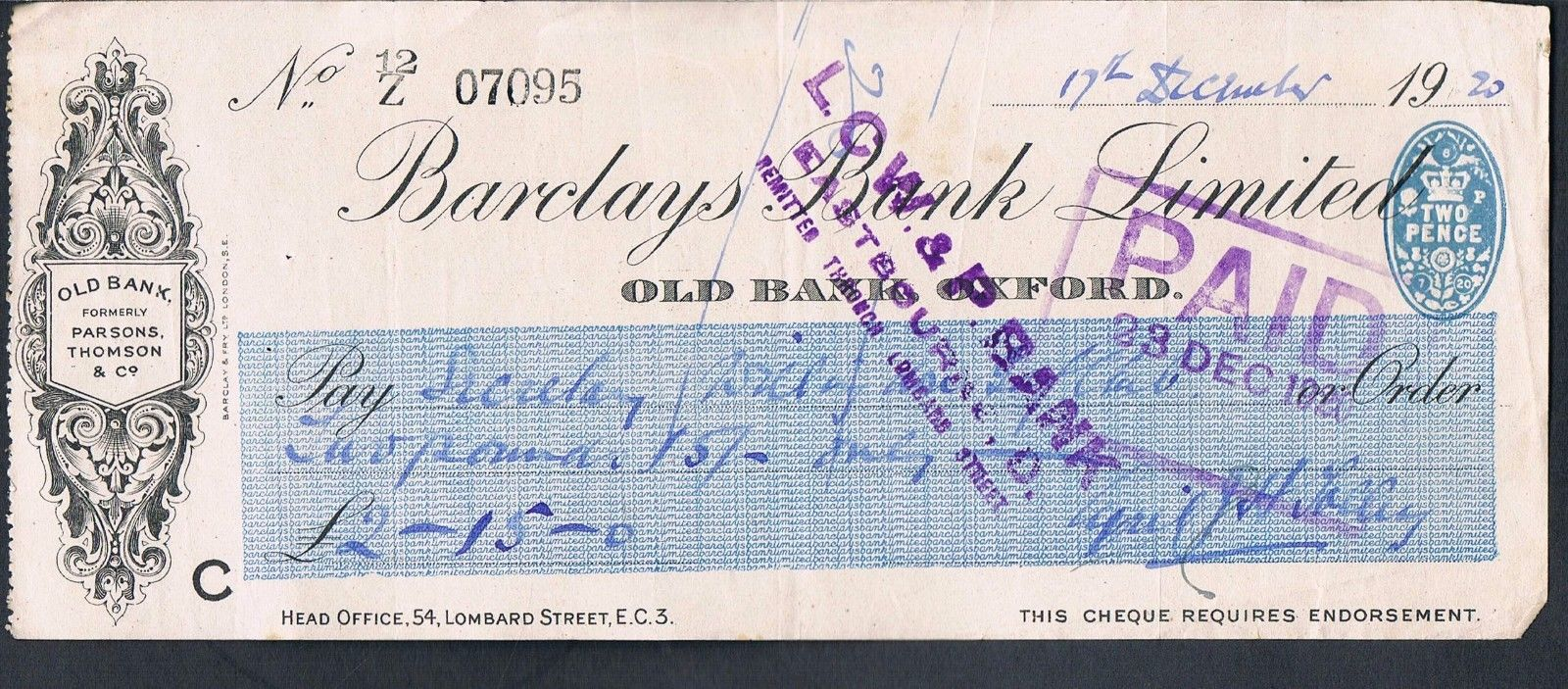
1920 Barclays Bank cheque from the Old Bank, Oxford

The main building of the Old Bank Hotel dates back to the 18th century, with number 93 not being erected until 1775 on a site owned by bankers John Parsons & William Fletcher called "George Hall". The five bays on the left were added in 1798. The corner of Magpie Lane was rebuilt by Stephen Salter in 1902 to imitate a sixteenth-century house. The building was separate from the bank until 1980 and was later a stationery shop run by Joseph Vincent. The buildings served as a bank (latterly as the main Oxford branch of Barclays Bank) from 1775 until 1998 when Jeremy Mogford bought the building to renovate it into a hotel.

== Facilities ==
The Georgian hotel has 43 rooms overlooking Oxford's towers and spires and is air-conditioned. The hotel has a number of 20th-century paintings, including Paddy Summerfield's ‘Handheld’ collection (commissioned for the hotel) and works by Stanley Spencer, Sandra Blow, Craigie Aitchison, Michael Ayrton, Roger Hilton, Harrington Mann, and Henrietta Dubrey.

Restaurant

Within the hotel is the Quod Restaurant and Bar. The restaurant is designed with stone floors, an oval zinc-topped bar and leather banquette seating. Quod's emphasis is on seasonal produce. The restaurant serves Mediterranean food and is decorated with recent British art. The hotel also has private areas.

== Local legend ==
Local legend tells of former resident Prudence Burcote, a Puritan maid whose unrequited love of a Cavalier resulted in her suicide. Although, according to Yurdan, her burial records held at University Church of St Mary the Virgin opposite make no mention of this (which is not surprising, as people who died by suicide were not allowed to be buried on consecrated ground until 1823). Nonetheless, a Cornish couple who later took up residence of the house reported a sighting of a figure in a long brown dress with a white fichu along with an array of flickering electrics and misplaced objects which they linked to the legend. During the building's later incarnation as a bank, staff continued to report the sound of mysterious footsteps and rustling skirts. Yurdan and Puttick, however, find no reports following the building's conversion to a hotel.
