= High Street, Oxford =

Street in Oxford, England

High Street
- The High
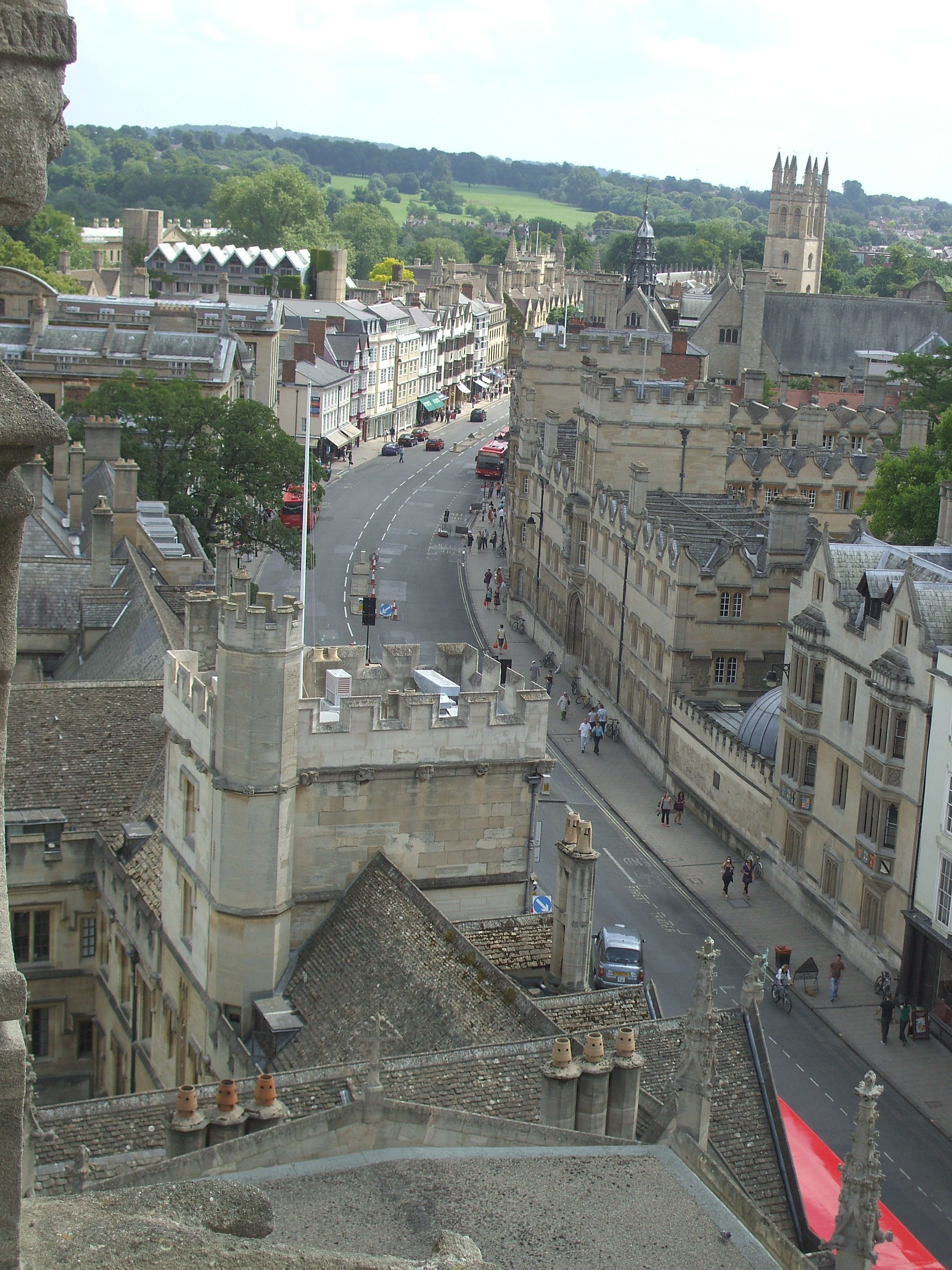
- The High Street from St Mary's, looking east
- Interactive map of High Street
- Location: Oxford, England
- Postal code: OX1
- Coordinates: 51.7525°N 1.252°W
- East end: Magdalen Bridge
- West end: Carfax
- South: M

Other
- Known for: Oxford colleges and buildings

The High Street in Oxford, England, known locally as the High, runs between Carfax, generally seen as the centre of the city, and Magdalen Bridge to the east.

== Overview ==
The architectural critic Nikolaus Pevsner wrote in 1974; "The High Street is one of the world's great streets. It has everything". His comment has an earlier echo in Thomas Hardy's Jude the Obscure: "And there's a street in the place – the main street – that ha'n't another like it in the world". It forms a gentle curve and is the subject of many prints, paintings, photographs, etc. Looking west towards Carfax with University College on the left and The Queen's College on the right is an especially popular view. There are many historical buildings on the street, including the University of Oxford buildings and colleges. Locally the street is often known as "The High".

== Major buildings ==
To the north are (west to east): Lincoln College (main entrance on Turl Street, including All Saints Church, now Lincoln College's library.), Brasenose College (main entrance in Radcliffe Square), St Mary's (the University Church), All Souls College, The Queen's College, St Edmund Hall (main entrance in Queen's Lane) and Magdalen College (including Magdalen Tower).

To the south are (west to east): Oriel College, University College (including the Boyle-Hooke plaque outside the Shelley Memorial), the Examination Schools, the Ruskin School of Drawing and Fine Art, the Eastgate Hotel (at the original entrance to the city) and the Botanic Garden.

== Commerce ==
Queen's Lane Coffee House (at the junction with Queen's Lane) was established in 1654 and was probably Oxford's first coffee house. This title is however disputed with 'The Grand Café' Coffee House, which claims that it was established in 1650 and stands opposite Queen's Lane coffee house. Despite an influx of chain stores in nearby Cornmarket Street, the High is home to a number of specialist independent retailers. These include Shepherd & Woodward (University outfitters), Payne & Son (goldsmiths), Sanders of Oxford (print sellers) and Waterfield's Books. To the north at the western end between Cornmarket and the Turl is the historic traditional Covered Market, established in 1774.

William Henry Butler, later Mayor of Oxford, was a wine merchant with premises in the High Street during the early 19th century. Edward Bracher, a pioneering Victorian photographer, had a shop at 26 High Street. Henry Taunt, another photographer, joined him as a member of staff in 1856. Taunt later returned to 41 High Street after the lease for his own shop premises in Broad Street expired in 1894. 83 High Street bears a blue plaque (10 October 2001) commemorating Sarah Cooper (1848–1932) marmalade maker, wife of Frank Cooper whose shop at 83–84 High Street was the origin of the Frank Cooper jam business (a brand now owned by Premier Foods). The company made "Oxford Marmalade" famous. In June 1879, George Claridge Druce (also a noted botanist and later mayor of the city) moved to Oxford and set up a chemist's shop, Druce & Co., at 118 High Street. This continued until his death 1932. The Old Bank Hotel was the first new hotel for 135 years in the centre of Oxford. Quod Restaurant & Bar is also part of the hotel, located between the junctions with Oriel Street and Logic Lane.

=== No. 126, The High ===
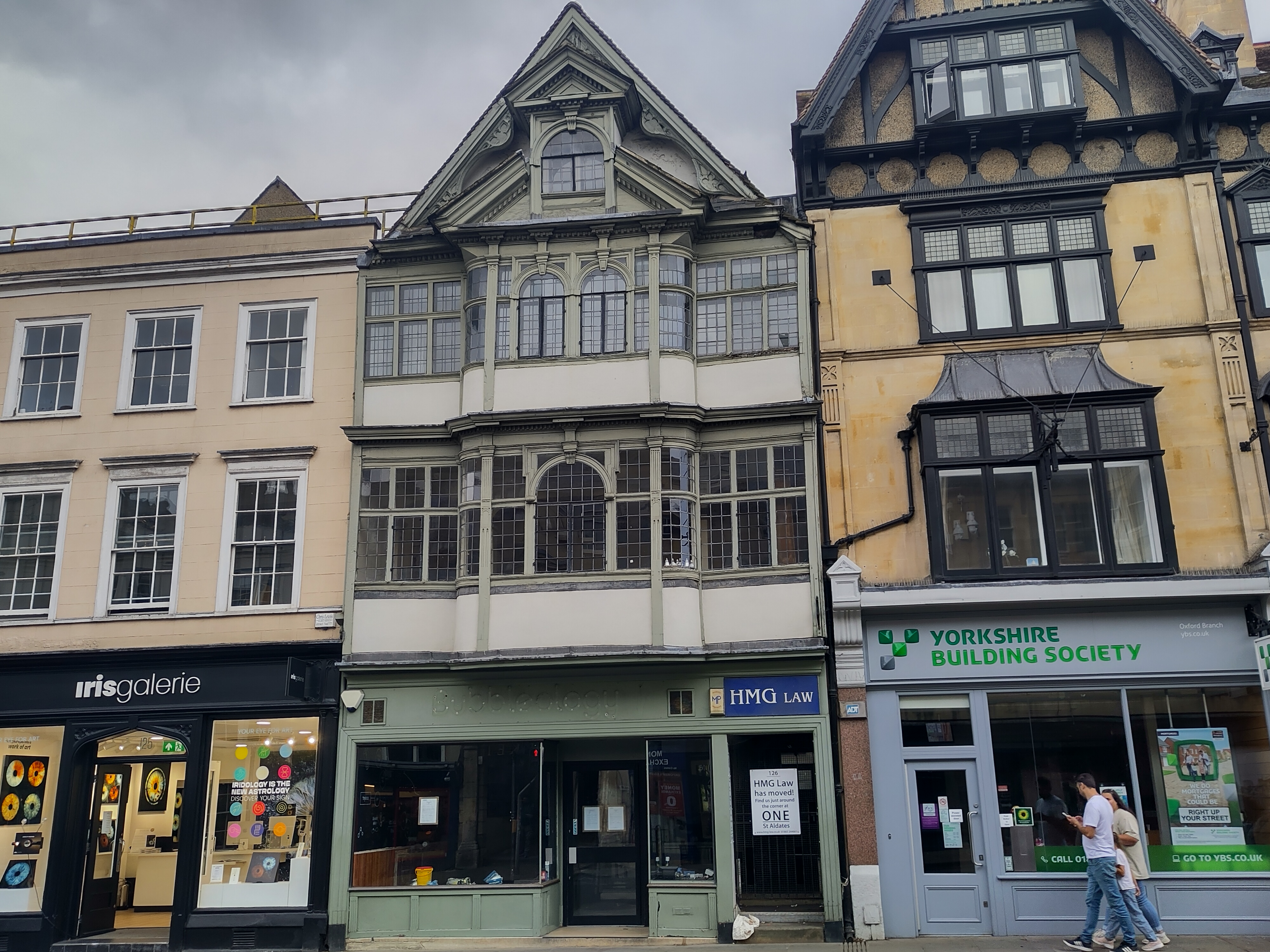
The street-facing facade of No. 126.

No. 126 The High Street is a rare survival of a late-Medieval shop with house above, dating from 1485 and is the only example remaining in Oxford. Three-storied, with timber framing and overhanging gables, it is a Grade I listed building.

== Adjoining streets ==
The following streets, also of historical significance, are off the High Street:

- Alfred Street
- Catte Street
- Cornmarket Street
- King Edward Street
- Logic Lane
- Longwall Street
- Magpie Lane
- Merton Street
- Oriel Street
- Queen Street
- Queen's Lane
- St Aldate's
- Turl Street

== Gallery ==
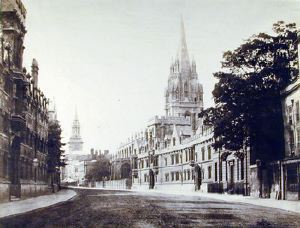
19th century photograph of the High Street looking west with University College on the left and the spires of the University Church of St Mary the Virgin and All Saints Church in the distance

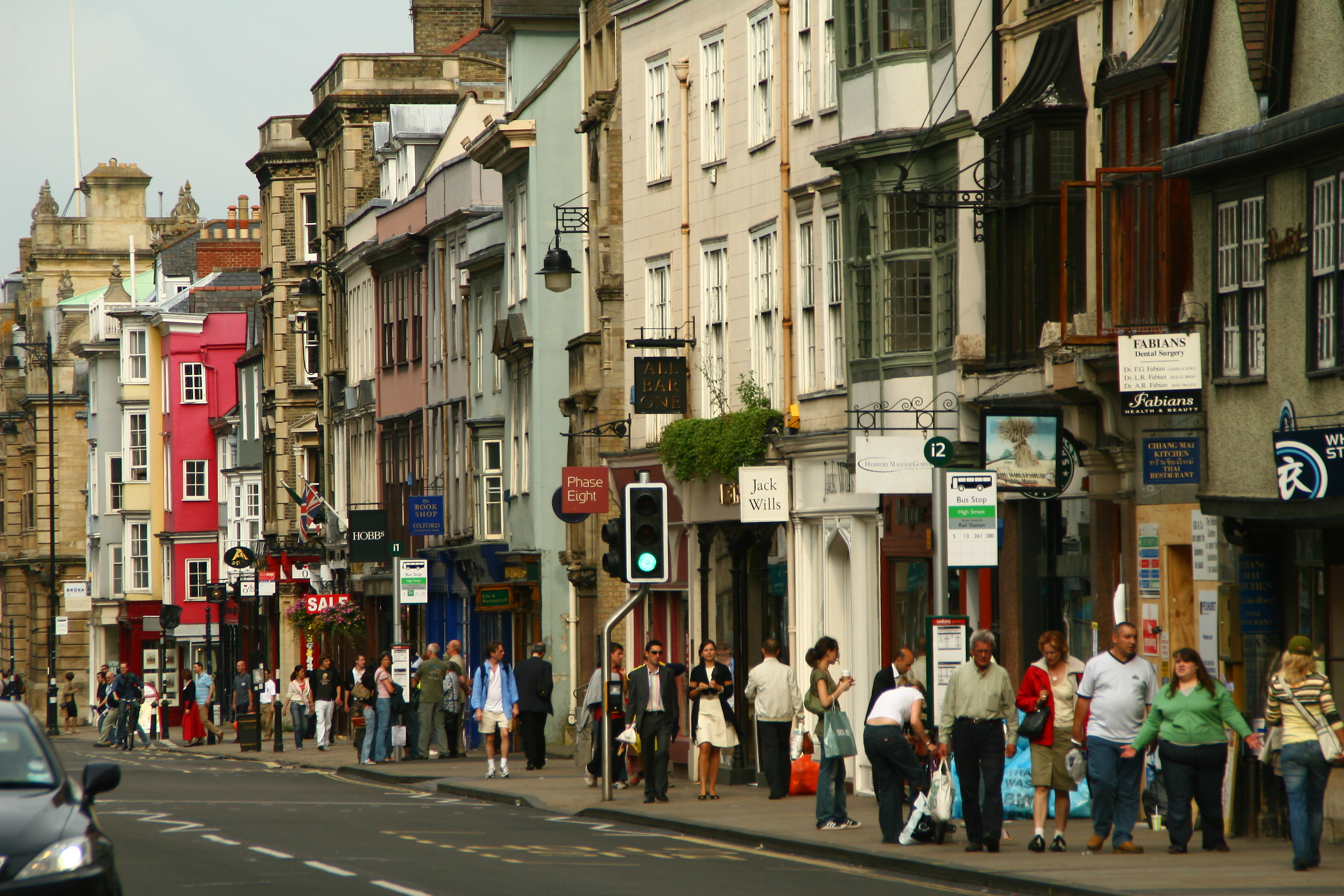
View along south side of the High Street from the Carfax end

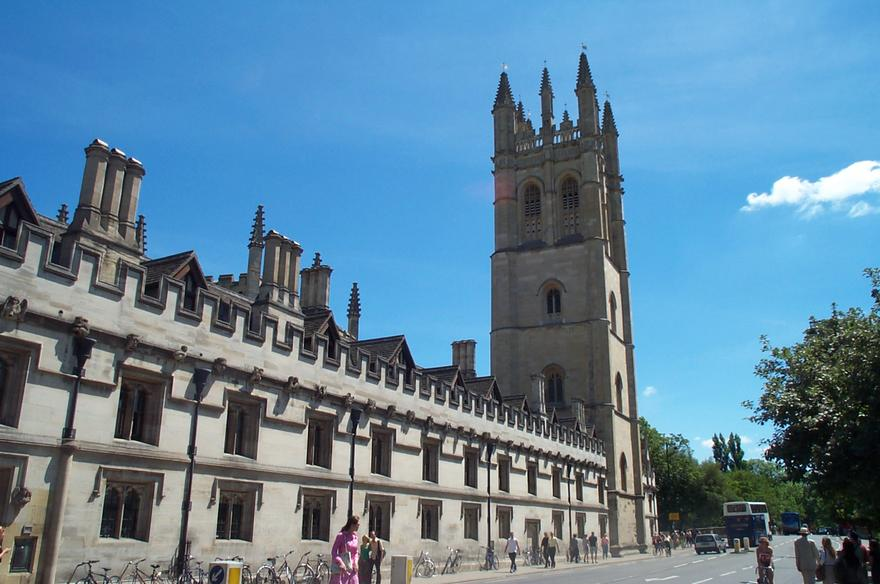
Magdalen College with its tower, at the eastern end of the High Street

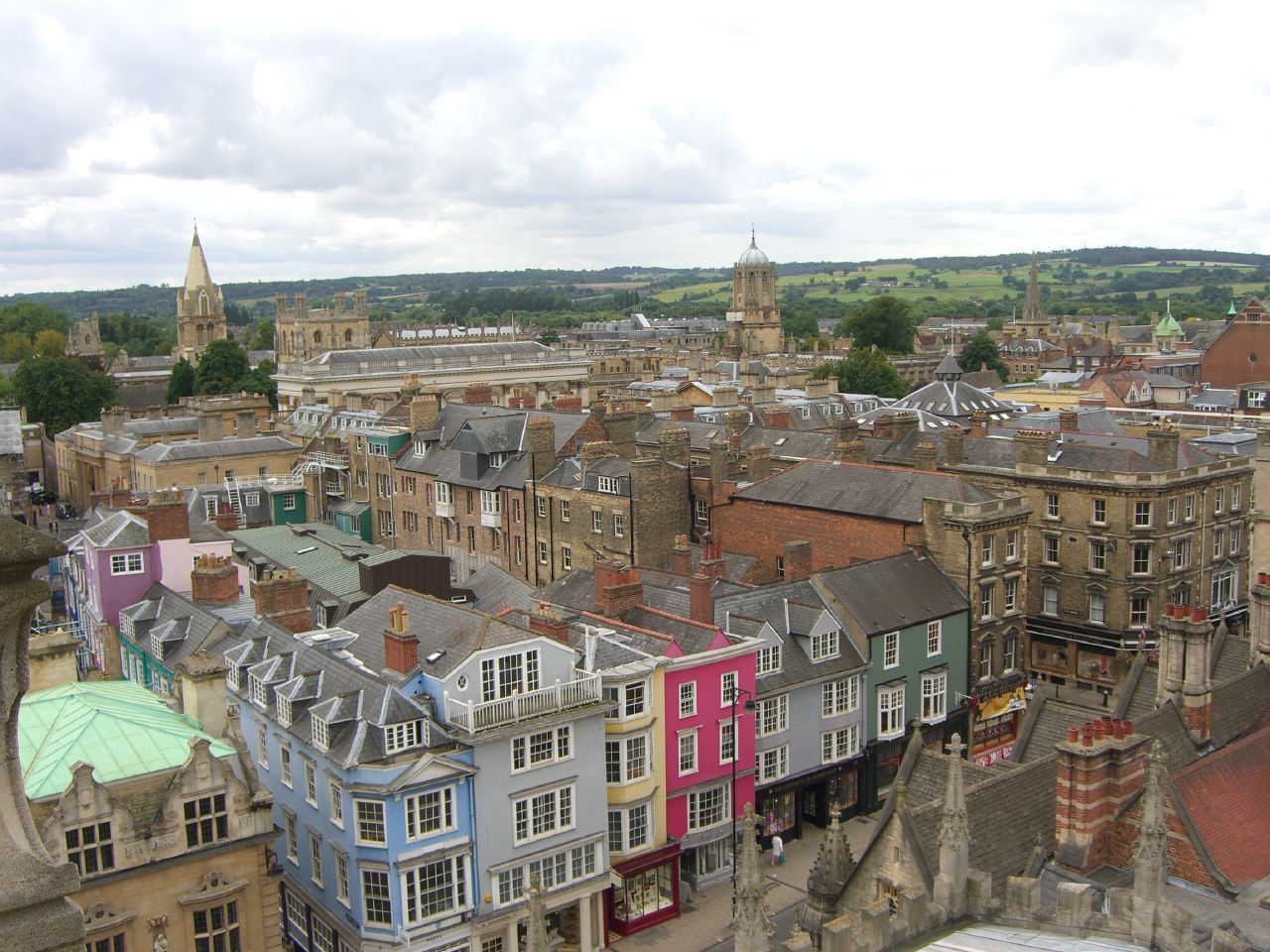
View down to buildings on the south side

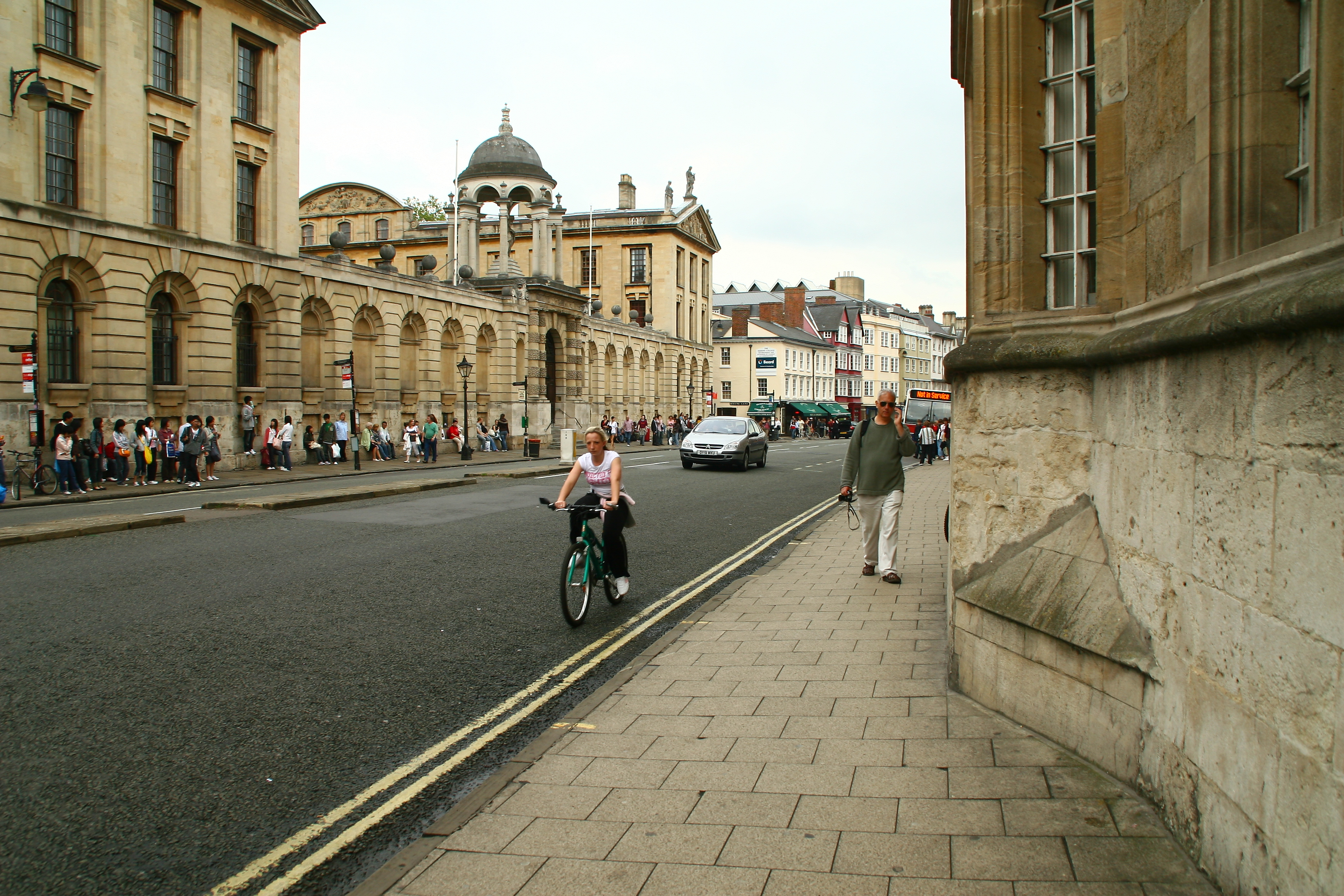
View eastwards towards The Queen's College

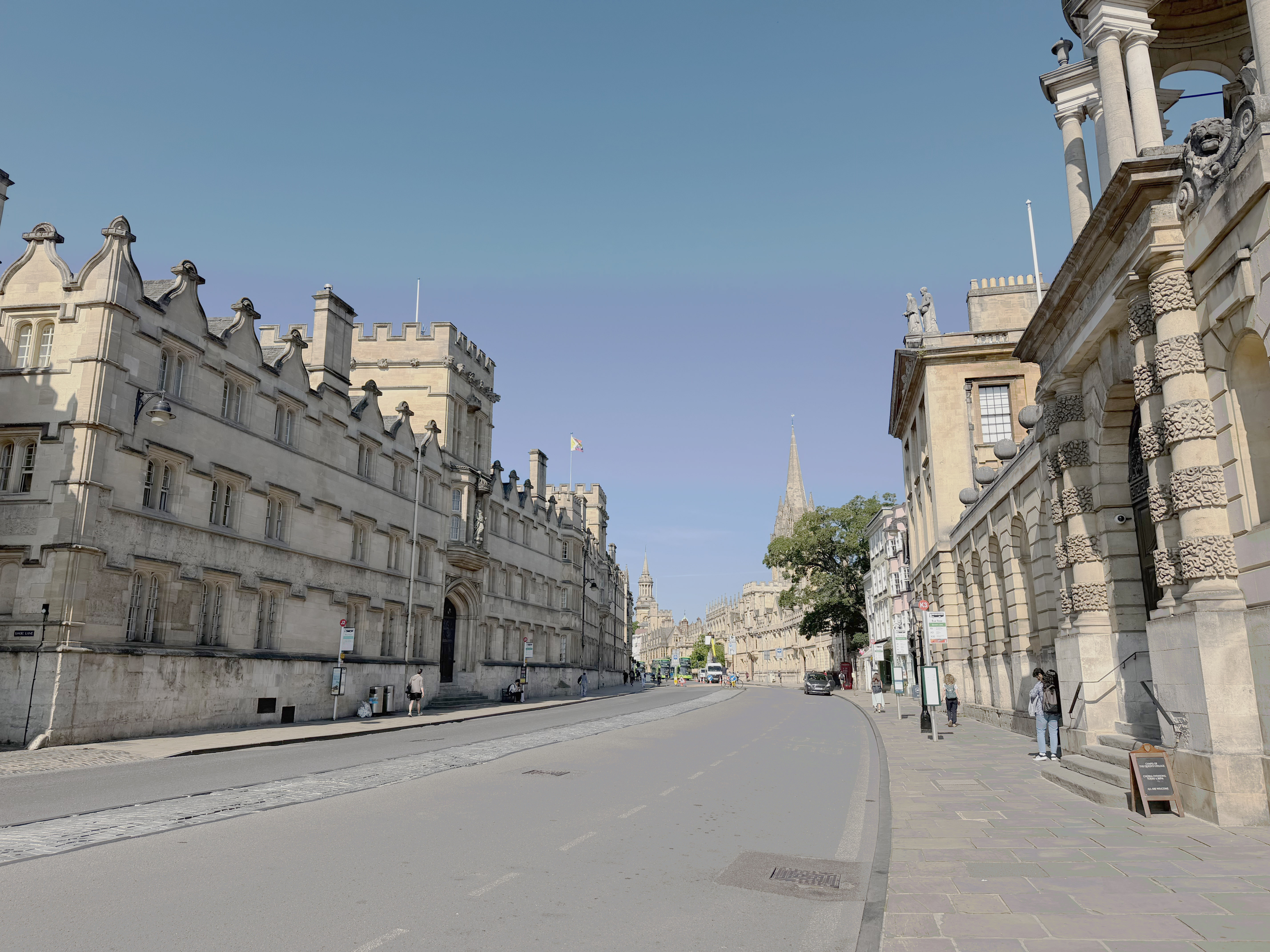
High Street, Oxford looking west from The Queen's College

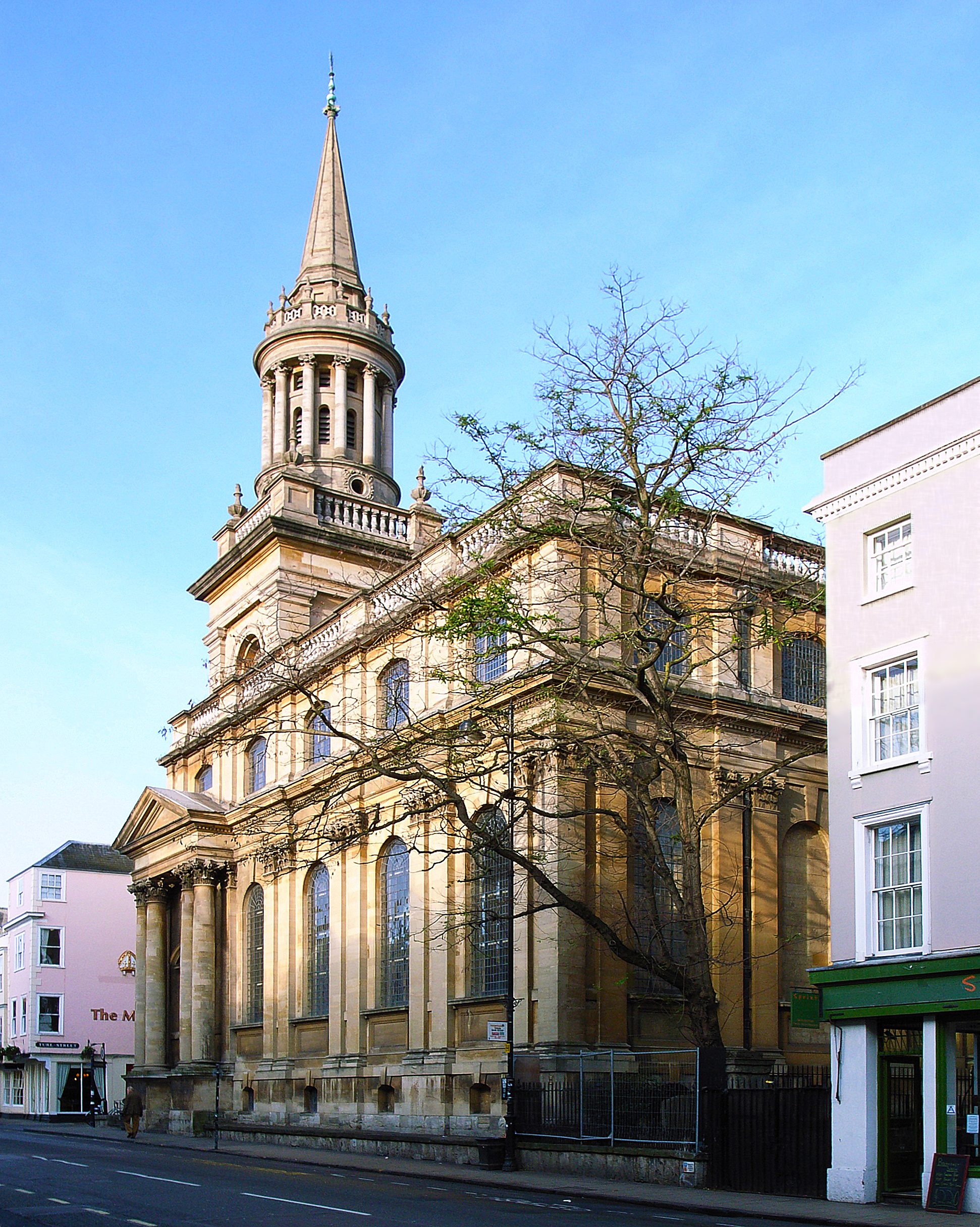
All Saints Church, now Lincoln College's library

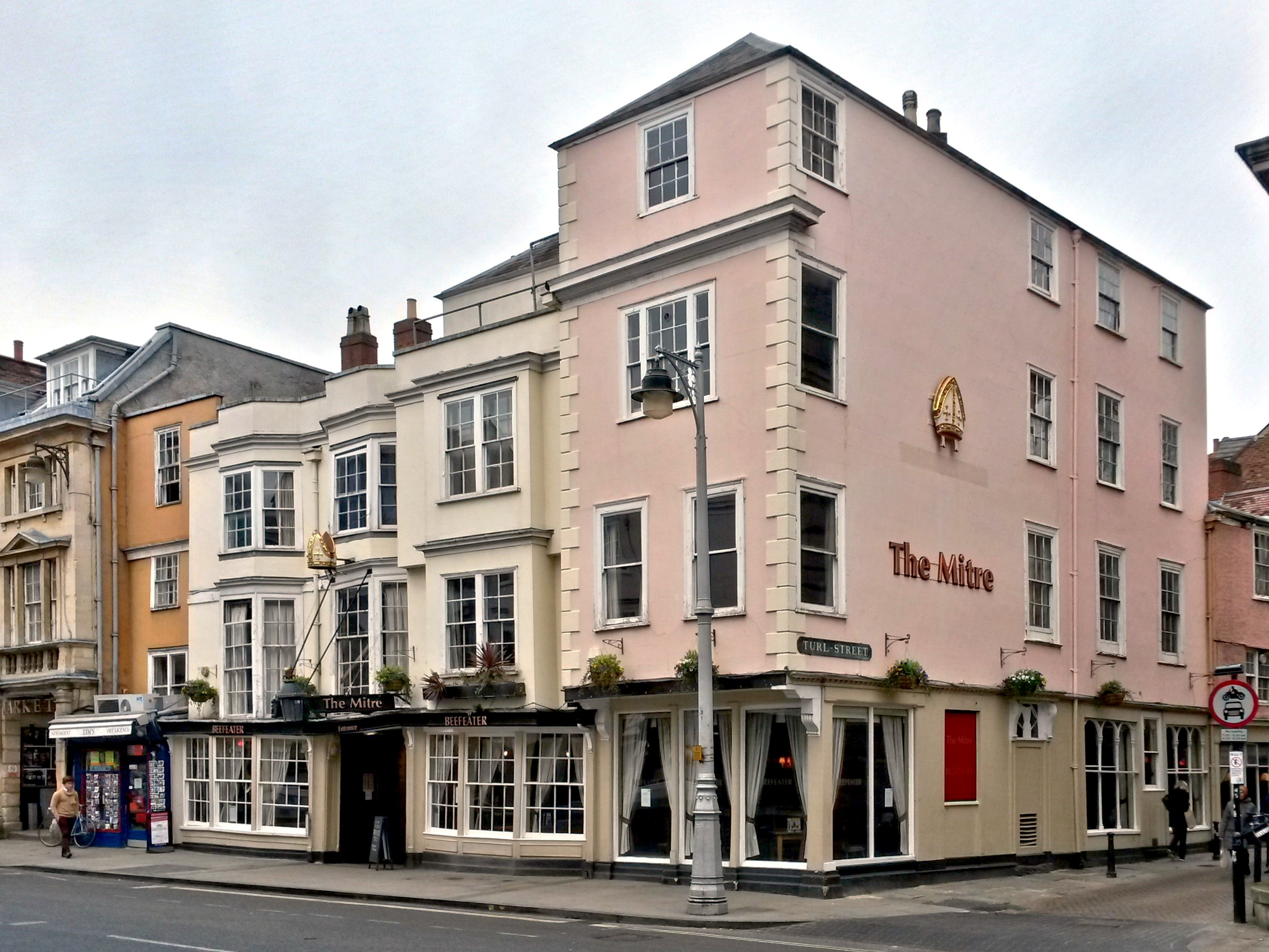
The Mitre Hotel

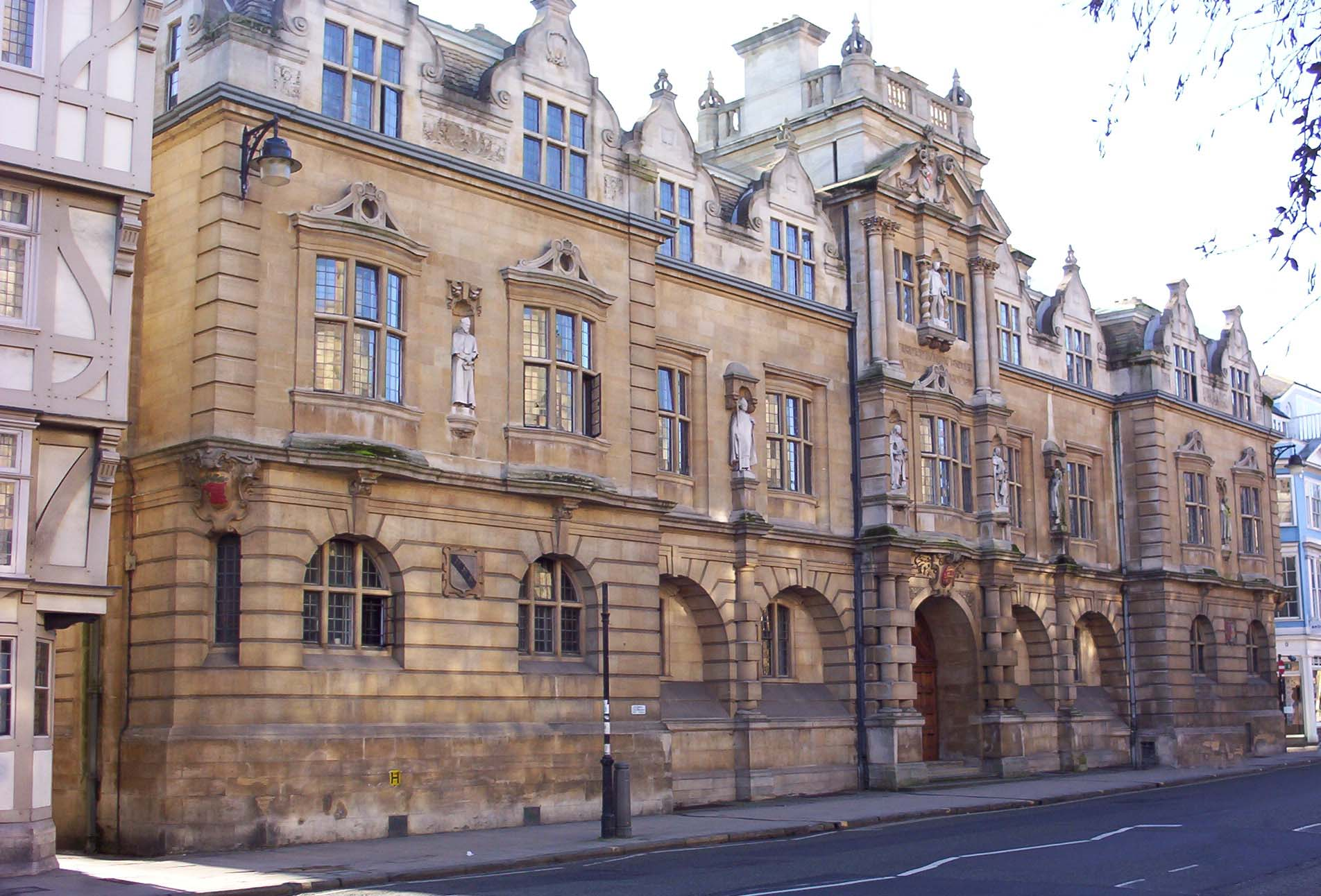
The Rhodes Building of Oriel College on the south side of the High Street

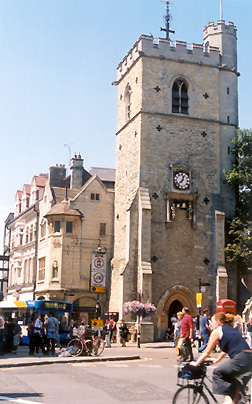
Carfax, at the western end of the High Street

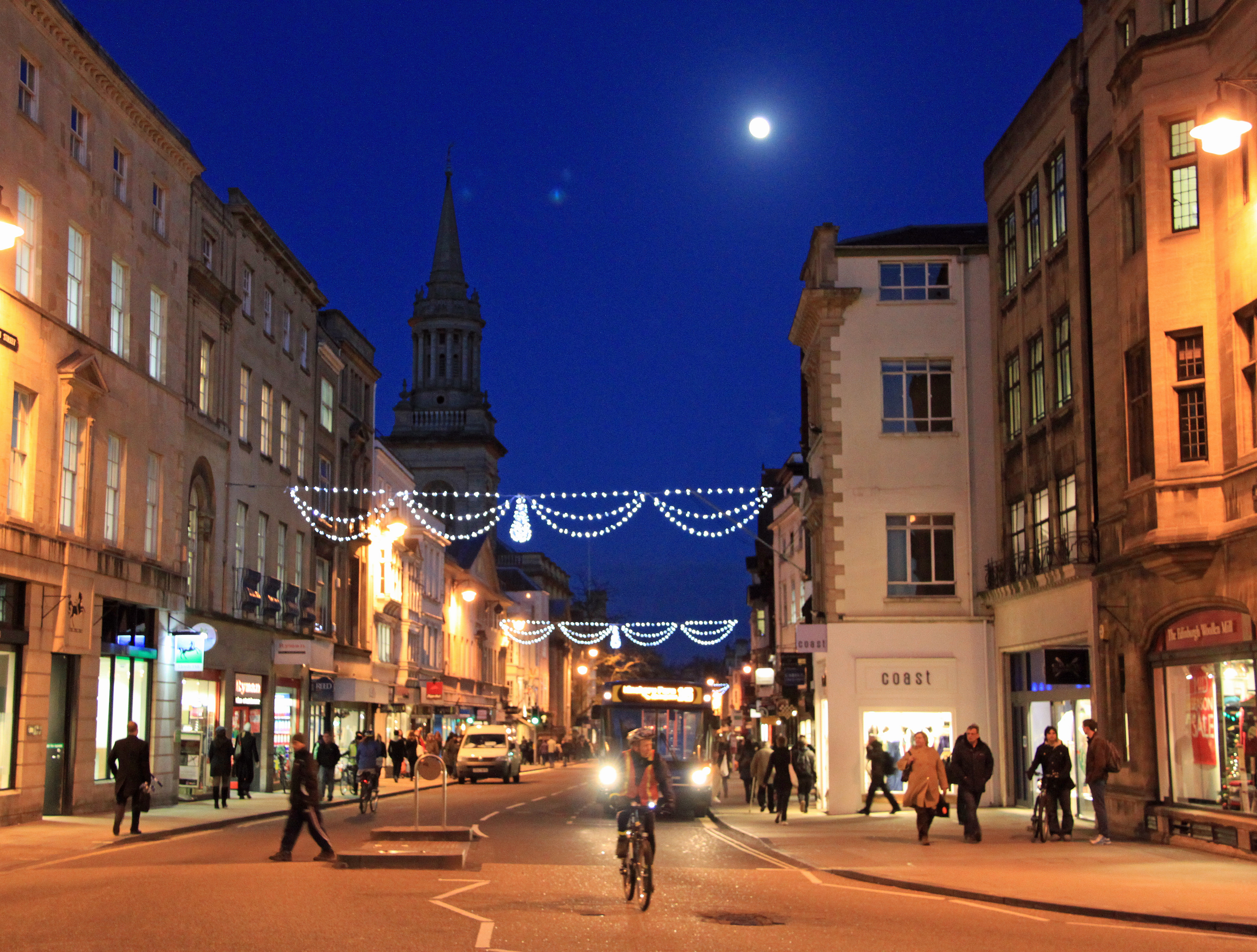
Night view of the High Street with Christmas lights, looking east from Carfax

== See also ==
- High Street, Oxford, an oil painting by J. M. W. Turner, exhibited in 1810
