= Edward Bracher =

Edward Bracher (1823 – 31 May 1887) was a pioneering British photographer based in Oxford, England.

Bracher was born in Salisbury, Wiltshire. He had photographic premises at 26 High Street, Oxford from 1852 to 1863. He worked mainly on portraits and commissioned landscapes, advertising as the "Oxford University Portrait Rooms" with "Portraits takes on Ivory, Paper, and Glass" as well as "Gentlemen's Mansions & Churches Photographed". Bracher lived over the premises with his wife and two children.

Henry Taunt, later another well-known photographer, joined Bracher at the age of 14 as a member of staff in 1856.

In 1863, Bracher sold his business to the Oxford booksellers and stationers, Wheeler and Day. The business transferred to 106 High Street, but Taunt stayed at the original premises as photographic manager for a brief period.

Bracher died at his brother's residence in Sedgehill, Reading, aged 64.
