= Henry Taunt =

Victorian era photographer

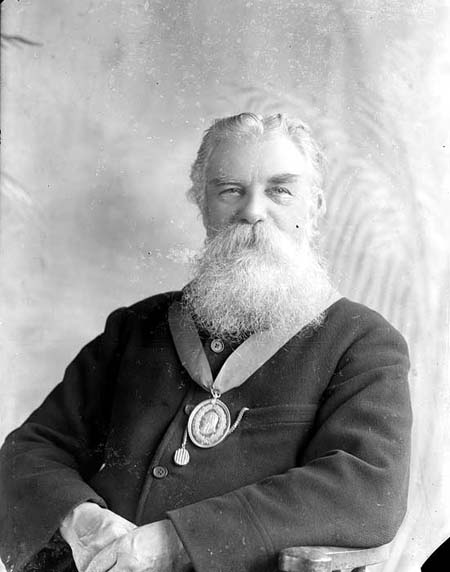
- Henry Taunt wearing a medal of the Ancient Order of Druids
- Born: 14 May 1842; St Ebbe's, Oxford, England
- Died: 4 November 1922 (aged 80); Cowley Road, Oxford
- Known for: Photography
- Spouse: Miriam Jeffery
- Awards: Fellow of the Royal Geographical Society

Henry William Taunt (1842–1922) was a professional photographer, author, publisher and entertainer based in Oxford, England.

== Birth ==
Henry Taunt was born in Penson's Gardens in the parish of St Ebbe's, Oxford. His father Henry was a plumber and glazier from Bletchingdon north of Oxford. Taunt's mother Martha Darter came from West Ilsley in Berkshire.

Taunt's birth name was William Henry Taunt, which he used until at least his marriage in 1863.

By 1871 he was known as Henry William Taunt, for the rest of his life.

== Career ==
Taunt worked first for his father, but decided he did not want to become a plumber. From the age of 11 Taunt worked first for a tailor, then for a stationer and next at a bookshop and auction room. Both the tailor and the bookshop and auction room were in High Street, Oxford.

In 1856, aged 14, Taunt joined the staff of Edward Bracher at 26 High Street. Bracher was Oxford's first commercial photographer, and for some years had a monopoly in the city. At first Taunt was a general assistant, but Bracher promoted him and in 1858 Taunt took his first photographs for Bracher.

In 1863 Bracher sold his business to Messrs Wheeler and Day, who kept Taunt on as photographic manager. In 1868 Taunt established his own photographic business. At first he had premises in St John's Road (now St Bernard's Road), but he gave these up and traded from his home in George Street. By January 1869 Taunt was selling photographs of Oxford and its neighbourhood for a shilling each. Later that year he started trading from a shop at 33, Cornmarket Street.

In 1871 Taunt successfully sued a London photographer, Theresa Conroy, who had pirated his photograph of the Oxford University Boat Club crew in The Boat Race. Also from 1871 Taunt was official photographer to the Oxford Architectural and Historical Society. In the same year he opened a shop in Friar's Entry selling window glass, but he gave this up in 1872.

In February 1873 he held a children's party in the then Oxford Town Hall. This became the first of a long series of children's events that Taunt ran, and for which he wrote much of the entertainment. By 1874 these entertainments included magic lantern shows.

Taunt's photographic business outgrew his tiny Cornmarket shop, so in 1874 he moved it to 9–10 Broad Street. He leased the building and spent £1,000 increasing it in height by two storeys. Behind the shop he established a picture-framing workshop in Boxall's Yard.

In 1873 Taunt had met a Miss Fanny Miles. In 1875 he opened a shop in High Wycombe, Buckinghamshire, where he seems to have put Miss Miles in charge. By 1878 Taunt ran also a cycle shop in New Inn Hall Street. Taunt was himself a keen cyclist, and often cycled to photographic locations.

Taunt had several staff. In 1885 he engaged a boy, Randolph Adams, who rose to be Taunt's assistant and became an expert photographer and developer.

From 1889 Taunt leased Canterbury House, a detached house in Cowley Road. He built photographic and printing premises in its grounds and renamed the house Rivera to reflect his love of the River Thames. He closed his shop in High Wycombe and moved Fanny Miles there as his housekeeper.

In 1893 Henry Taunt was elected a Fellow of the Royal Geographical Society. This was a substantial honour in recognition of the notable feat of cartography and accuracy of measurements that featured in the New Map of the Thames. He went on to write a series of local guide books, illustrated with his own photographs. The New York Times considered Taunt's guides to the Thames to be "as essential as the boat for a successful journey".

In 1894 the lease on 9–10 Broad Street expired. The lessor, Alderman Carr, refused to renew the lease. Carr's executors locked Taunt out of the shop, held its fitting as security and demanded £225 plus legal costs and a year's rent. But Taunt had already accumulated £1,300 in bad debts, his liabilities exceeded his assets by almost £119, so he gave up his Broad Street premises and filed for bankruptcy.

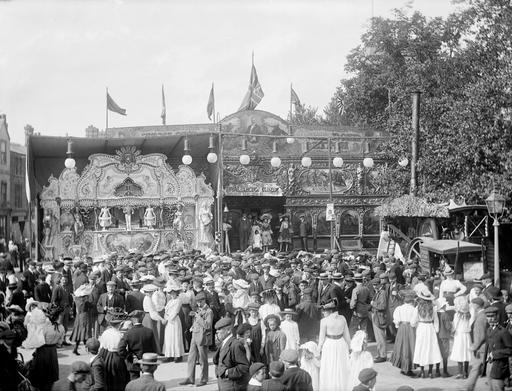
1905 Taunt photograph of St Giles' Fair, Oxford. In 1907 Taunt published a booklet of the history of the fair.

Taunt relocated to 41 High Street, and by February 1895 was trading from 34 High Street. With the advent of cheap picture postcards Taunt gave up selling souvenir photographic prints. He met the competition with photographic postcards of his own, at first monochrome and then colour tinted.

In 1906 he gave up his High Street premises and traded solely from Rivera in Cowley Road. In the years before the First World War he employed about a dozen staff there. In 1908, as a member of the Ancient Order of Druids' Albion Lodge at Oxford, he took the famous picture of Winston Churchill's initiation into the AOD at Blenheim Palace.

When war broke out Taunt reduced his staff to a minimum, but retained Adams until the latter was conscripted in 1918. Taunt's wartime products included greeting cards, calendars and patriotic songs. One of his wartime cards, published in 1915, bore on one side a poem called Good Luck and Safe Return and, on the other, a space in which to paste a photograph under the title "Never Forgotten at Home".

== Work ==
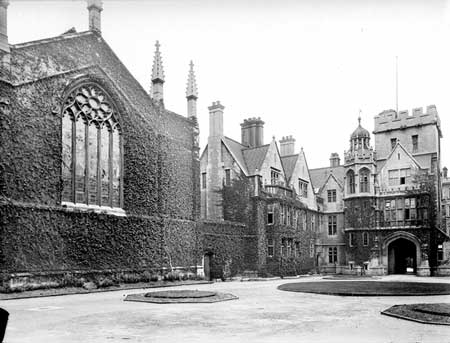
1909 Taunt photograph of New Quad, Brasenose College, Oxford

Henry Taunt's black-and-white photographs are mainly views of Oxford, Oxfordshire and adjoining counties. The River Thames is a prominent and recurrent theme in his work. From childhood he loved the river, boating on it and frequently on Trill Mill Stream, a Thames tributary in Oxford. At Christmas in 1859, aged 17, Taunt boated solo from Oxford upriver to Lechlade in Gloucestershire and back.

Taunt produced the first pocket guide to the River Thames to be illustrated with photographs. In the 1860s it covered the upper Thames, but it expanded its range over several editions. In 1872 Taunt published A New Map of the River Thames on a scale of 1:126,720 (half an inch to a mile).

The wet collodion process, invented by Frederick Scott Archer, was the best means to capture negative images on glass until the end of the 1870s, by which time many of Taunt's pictures for his Illustrated Map of the Thames had been taken. He would row his skiff to a location, set up his dark tent, set up his camera and tripod, sensitise and coat the glass plate, immediately make the two- or three-second exposures, develop and fix the images, wash them in river water, perhaps dry them in the sun and row back to his lodgings or set up camp with his assistants. At the beginning of the 1860s this was a notable feat of skill.

After his bankruptcy in 1894 Taunt continued to explore the Thames, but now with a comfortable houseboat.

== Family ==
In 1863 Taunt married a dressmaker, Miriam Jeffery. They had no children. (Two children, Roland and Cissie, are sometimes attributed to them. However, they were born in the 1880s to Frederic William Taunt and Charlotte (Baker) in the Witney district.) In later life Mrs Taunt was an invalid and lived upstairs at Rivera. In 1884 Taunt's father died and his mother also moved to live at Rivera.

== Legacy ==
Taunt died in 1922, six months after he turned 80. He left his entire estate to Fanny Miles, who with her sister Polly remained at Rivera for some years thereafter.

Taunt's estate included at least 53,000 photographic glass negatives. But the house was bought by a local builder, Frank Organ, and the glass negatives started to be either stripped for use as greenhouse glass or else smashed. A local historian alerted the Oxford City librarian, who in 1924–25 bought several thousand of Taunt's negatives and some of his prints, papers and manuscripts, for £98 10s.

Taunt's photographs appear in many books and fare an historical record of social history and architecture. Major collections of his work are held by Historic England: 14,000 images, Oxfordshire County Council: Oxfordshire Studies and the River and Rowing Museum at Henley-on-Thames.

== Sources and further reading ==
- Brown, Bryan, ed. (1973). The England of Henry Taunt: Victorian photographer. London: Routledge and Kegan Paul Ltd. ISBN 978-0-7100-7542-0.
- Diprose, Graham; Robins, Jeff (2007). The River Thames Revisited: In the Footsteps of Henry Taunt. London: Frances Lincoln Publishers. ISBN 978-0-7112-2765-1.
- Graham, Malcolm (1973). Henry Taunt of Oxford: A Victorian Photographer. Headington: Oxford Illustrated Press. ISBN 0-902280-14-7.
- Graham, Malcolm; Waters, Laurence (2006). Oxford Then and Now: From the Henry Taunt Collection. In Old Photographs. Stroud: Alan Sutton Publishing. ISBN 0-7509-4224-X.
- Read, Susan, ed. (1989). Thames of Henry Taunt. Stroud: Alan Sutton Publishing. ISBN 0-86299-616-3.
