= Rose Bracher =

British botanist (1894–1941)

- Born: 1894; Salisbury, England
- Died: 15 July 1941 (aged 46–47); Bristol, England
- Occupation: Botanist
- Known for: Fellow of the Linnean Society of London

Academic background
- Education: University of Bristol
- Thesis: The ecology of the Avon banks at Bristol (1927)

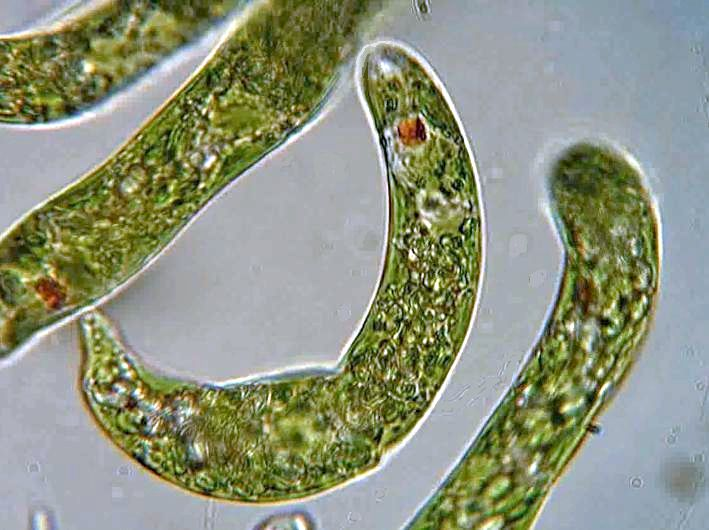
Bracher studied Euglena

Rose Bracher (1894 – 15 July 1941) was a British botanist, mycologist and academic. She researched the ecology of the mud flats of the River Avon at Bristol and in particular the genus Euglena. She was elected a Fellow of the Linnean Society in 1938. Bracher lectured at the University of Bristol, and in 1941 she was the first non-professorial woman to be elected to the university Senate. The university offers a memorial prize in her name for the best student in botany, zoology and biology.

== Life ==
Bracher was born in Salisbury in Wiltshire in 1894, the eldest daughter of Reuben Bracher. She was educated at the school her father was headmaster at, and then obtained a B.Sc. in 1917, followed by a year of research with O. V. Darbishire, and then an M.Sc. in 1918 and a Ph.D. in 1927. All her degrees were from the University of Bristol. Bracher's doctoral thesis was on the ecology of the banks of the River Avon. She worked as a demonstrator at the London School of Medicine for Women (1918–1920), and then was awarded the Rose Sidgwick Fellowship to spend a year researching mycology at the University of Wisconsin.

Bracher returned to the UK as a lecturer at the East London College (1921–1924), and took up a post of lecturer at the University of Bristol in 1924 which she held until her death in 1941. Bracher was elected a Fellow of the Linnean Society in 1938.

In 1940 Bracher was given the title of Senior Lecturer and in 1941 was the first non-professorial woman to be elected to the Senate of the University, a month before her sudden death. Obituaries for Bracher were published in Nature and the Proceedings of the Linnean Society.

The University of Bristol offers an annual prize in Bracher's memory, the Rose Bracher Memorial Prize for the best student in botany, zoology and biology.

== Selected publications ==
- Ecology in Town and Classroom J.W. Arrowsmith, Bristol, 1937
- A Book of Common Flowers, illustrated by Dorothy Bromby; Oxford University Press, 1941
- Bracher, Rose (February 1929). "The Ecology of the Avon Banks at Bristol". Journal of Ecology. 17 (1): 35–81. doi:10.2307/2255913. JSTOR 2255913.
- Bracher, Rose (July 1937). "The light relations of Euglena limosa Gard.—Part I. The influence of intensity and quality of light on phototaxy". Botanical Journal of the Linnean Society. 51 (337): 23–42. doi:10.1111/j.1095-8339.1937.tb01902.x.
