= Queen's Lane Coffee House =

English coffee house

Coordinates: 51°45′9.8″N 1°15′1.6″W

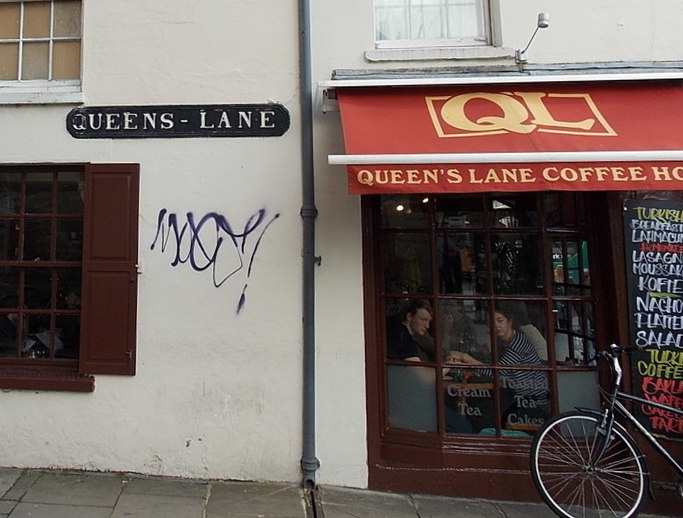
Side of the Queen's Lane Coffee House on Queen's Lane

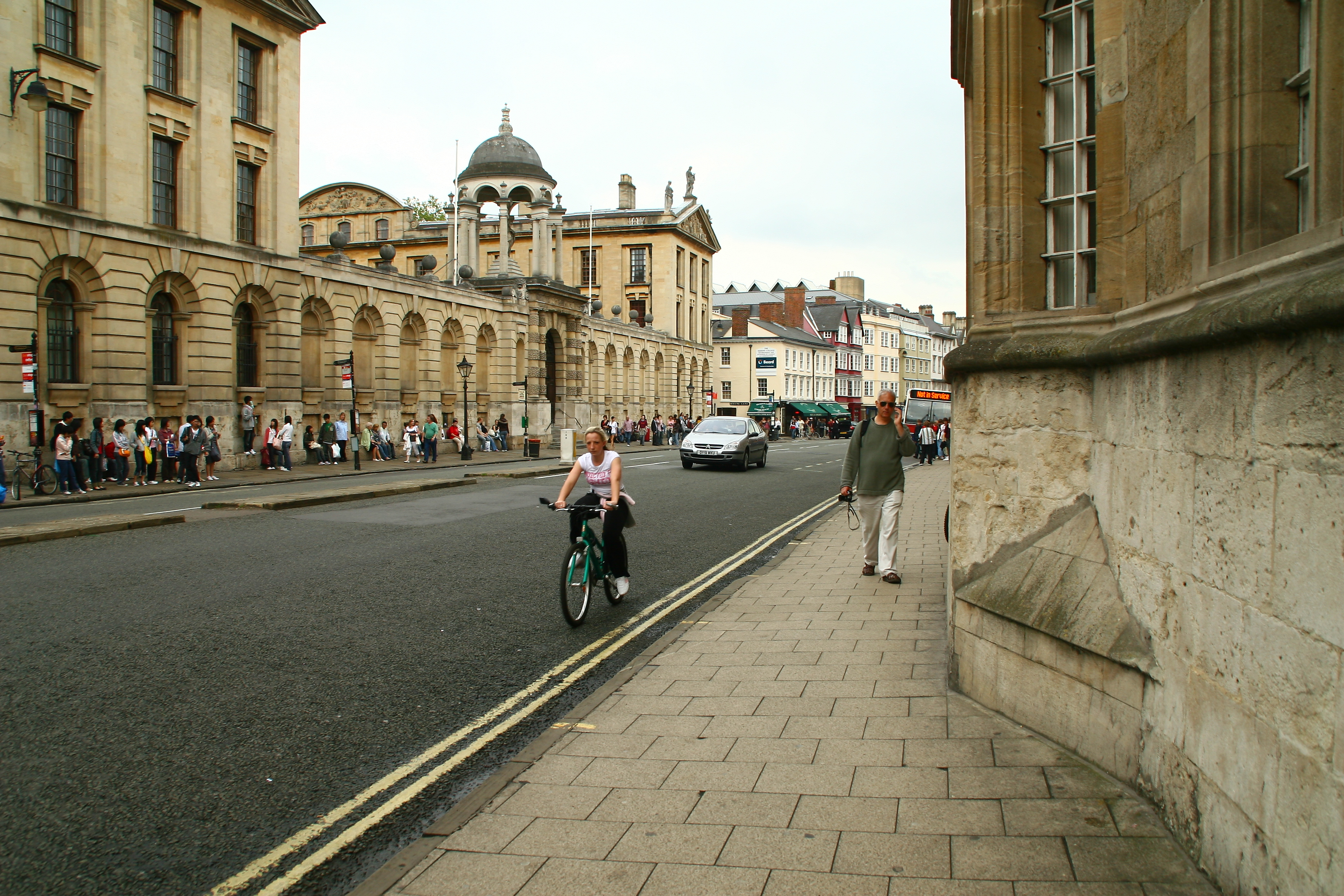
View of the High Street in Oxford, with the Queen's Lane Coffee House in the distance, past the Queen's College on the left.

Queen's Lane Coffee House is a historic coffee house established by Cirques Jobson, a Levantine Jew from Syria. Dating back to 1654, it is the oldest continually serving coffee house in Europe, but it has only been on the present site (Oxford, England) since 1970. The building in which it operates is a Grade II listed building. It was in this coffee house where Jeremy Bentham first conceived of Utilitarianism.

In 2009, it rebranded itself as "QL". There is a second, smaller, QL Café. Another Café QL (now called Café Bonjour) in Headington was once owned by the same family but was sold years ago.

The café has been owned by the same family since 1983.

== See also ==
- English coffeehouses in the 17th and 18th centuries
- History of coffee
