= Nathaniel Clarkson =

British painter (1724–1795)

- Born: 1724
- Died: 26 September 1795 (aged 70–71)
- Occupation: Painter

Nathaniel Clarkson (1724 – 26 September 1795) was a British painter.

== Biography ==
Clarkson began his artistic career as a coach-painter and sign-painter. In the latter capacity, he has by some been credited with the famous ‘Shakespeare’ sign, which is generally attributed to Samuel Wale, R.A. He resided in Church Street, Islington, and in 1754 painted and presented to his parish church, St. Mary, Islington, an altarpiece of ‘The Annunciation,’ having on either side emblems of the law and gospel in chiaroscuro. This picture remained at the east end of the church till the late 19th century, when it was removed to make way for a stained-glass window. Clarkson was a member of the Incorporated Society of Artists, and one of the artists who sub- scribed to the charter of incorporation in 1765. He exhibited with that society in 1762, 1764, 1765, 1767, the works contributed being portraits, including one of himself. In 1777, he painted and presented to the Merchant Taylors' Company, of which he was a member of the court of assistants, a large picture, representing Henry VII granting the charter to the master, Richard Smith, and wardens of the company in 1503. For this pretentious and ill-executed picture, which still hangs in the court room of the company, Clarkson was voted the thanks of the company, and presented with a piece of plate. In 1788, he was one of the committee appointed to select a painter for the portrait of George Bristow, clerk to the company, Opie being chosen in preference to Sir Joshua Reynolds. The house in which Clarkson lived in Islington stood until October 1886; it contained some figures painted in chiaroscuro, representing ‘Design, Sculpture, and Architecture.’ He died 26 September 1795, and was buried 2 December at St. Mary's, Islington.
