= Cornmarket Street =

Pedestrian street in Oxford, England

- Cornmarket
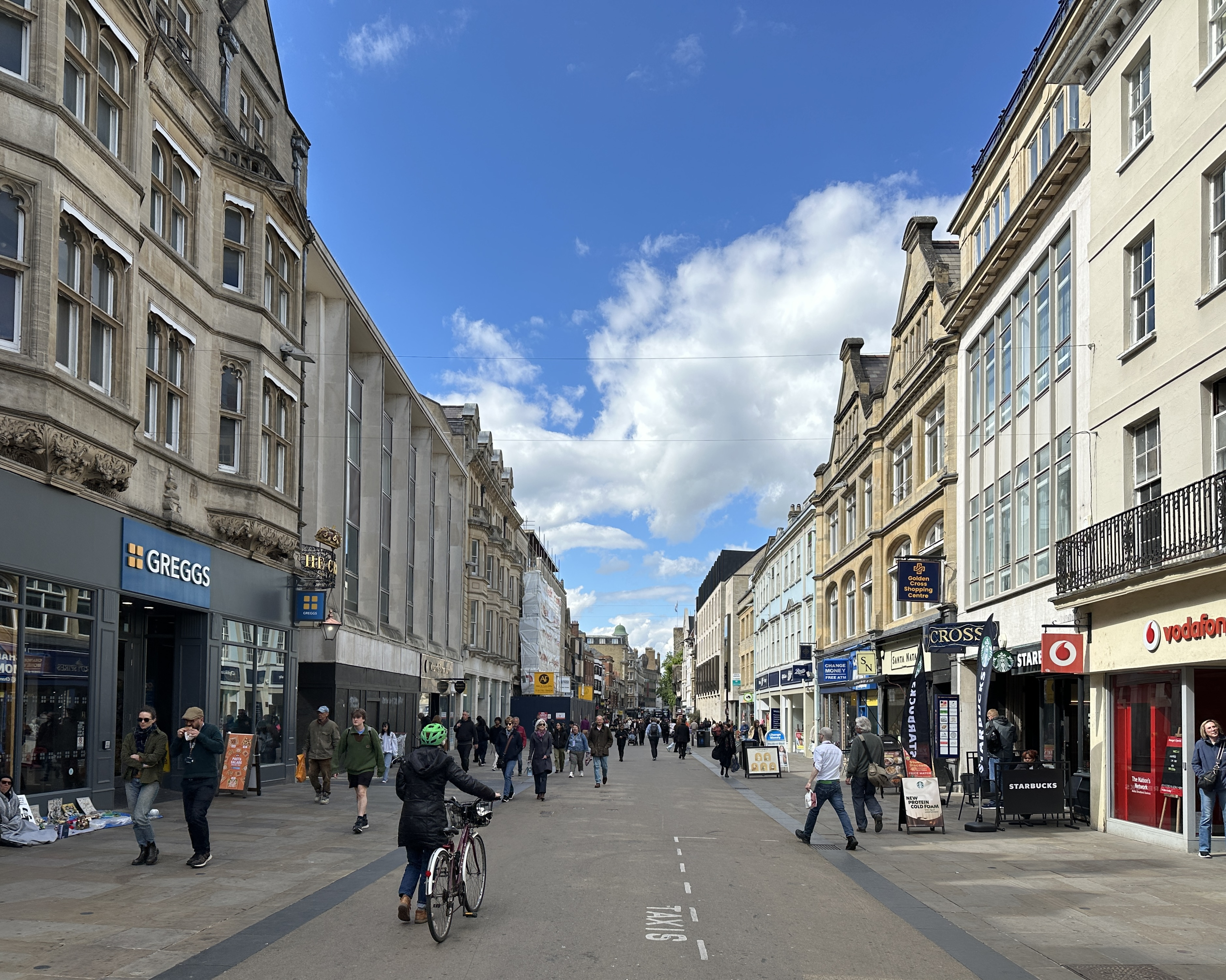
- Cornmarket Street in 2026

- Location within Oxford Location within Oxfordshire
- Former name: The Corn
- Location: Oxford, England
- Coordinates: 51.7530°N 1.2584°W
- North end: George Street
- Major junctions: Golden Cross, Clarendon Shopping Centre
- South end: Carfax Tower

Other
- Known for: Shopping
- Status: Pedestrian precinct

Cornmarket Street (colloquially referred to as Cornmarket or historically The Corn) is a major shopping street and pedestrian precinct in Oxford, England, which runs north to south between Magdalen Street and Carfax Tower.

To the east is the Golden Cross arcade of small jewellery and craft shops in a courtyard, leading to the Covered Market. To the west is the indoor Clarendon Shopping Centre that connects in an L-shape to Queen Street.

Cornmarket was semi-pedestrianised and made a limited-access street in 1999. Cycling is allowed 6pm to 10am. In 2002, it was voted Britain's second worst street in a poll of listeners to the Today programme. The rating was largely due to a failed attempt to repave the street in 2001. The granite setts, which had been laid extensively, cracked and the contractor went into liquidation. In 2003, it was repaved again and new benches installed, amidst reports of budgetary problems.

== History of shops ==
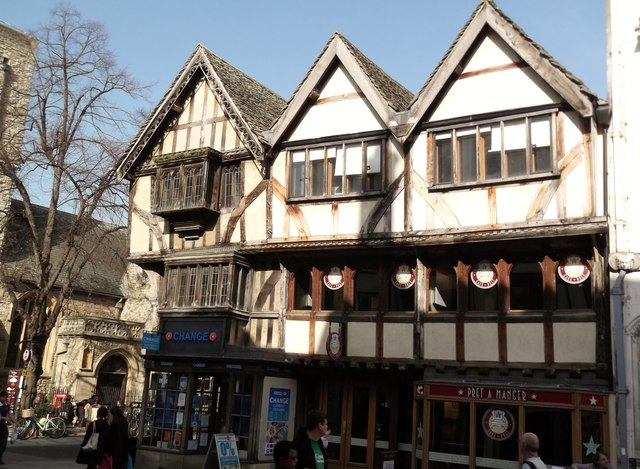
26–27 Cornmarket Street, a 14th century building, former location of Zac's, and now a Pret a Manger sandwich shop

26–28 Cornmarket on the corner of Ship Street is a 14th-century timber-framed building. It is the surviving half of a building completed in about 1386 as the New Inn. It belongs to Jesus College and was investigated and restored in 1983.

Boswells of Oxford established what was the largest department store in Oxford at 50 Cornmarket Street in 1738. In 1928, the shop opened a new main entrance on Broad Street, but it still retained an entrance on Cornmarket Street. The store closed in 2020.

The Victorian photographer Henry Taunt set up a shop at 33 Cornmarket Street in 1869. It was a small shop and in 1874 he moved to larger premises in Broad Street.

Zac's was a waterproof clothing manufacturing and retail firm based at 26–27 Cornmarket, established in the 1880s and closed in 1983.

Woolworths bought the Clarendon Hotel on the west side of the street in 1939 with the intention of demolishing it for the construction of a new store on the site. In earlier centuries, the Clarendon had been the Star Inn. It was a complex of 16th- and 17th-century buildings, one of which had a vaulted Norman cellar dating from the second half of the 12th century: possibly the oldest vaulted structure in Oxford. Thomas Sharp, in Oxford Replanned (1948) a report commissioned by Oxford City Council, warned that Oxford was already short of quality hotel accommodation and the Clarendon's demolition would be a mistake. Notwithstanding Sharp's conclusions, Woolworths demolished the hotel in 1954–55. After demolition of all the buildings above the surface, parts of the 12th-century vault were destroyed to make way for one of the columns of Clarendon House built in its place.

Clarendon House was designed by William Holford and built in 1956–1957. The façade is of coursed and squared rubble masonry with panels of blue-green slate, and Nikolaus Pevsner commended the building as tactful and elegant. The building is now part of the Clarendon Shopping Centre.

== St Michael at the North Gate ==
The tower of the Church of England parish church of St Michael at the North Gate is the oldest building in Oxford. It is Saxon and dates from about 1000–1050. The church is named after the medieval gate of the Oxford city wall that spanned the north end of Cornmarket.

Near this church was the Bocardo Prison, where the Oxford Martyrs were imprisoned in 1555–56 before being burnt at the stake outside the town wall in what is now Broad Street nearby.

== Adjoining streets ==
- Broad Street
- George Street
- High Street
- Magdalen Street
- Market Street
- Queen Street
- St Aldate's
- St Michael's Street
- Ship Street

== Gallery ==
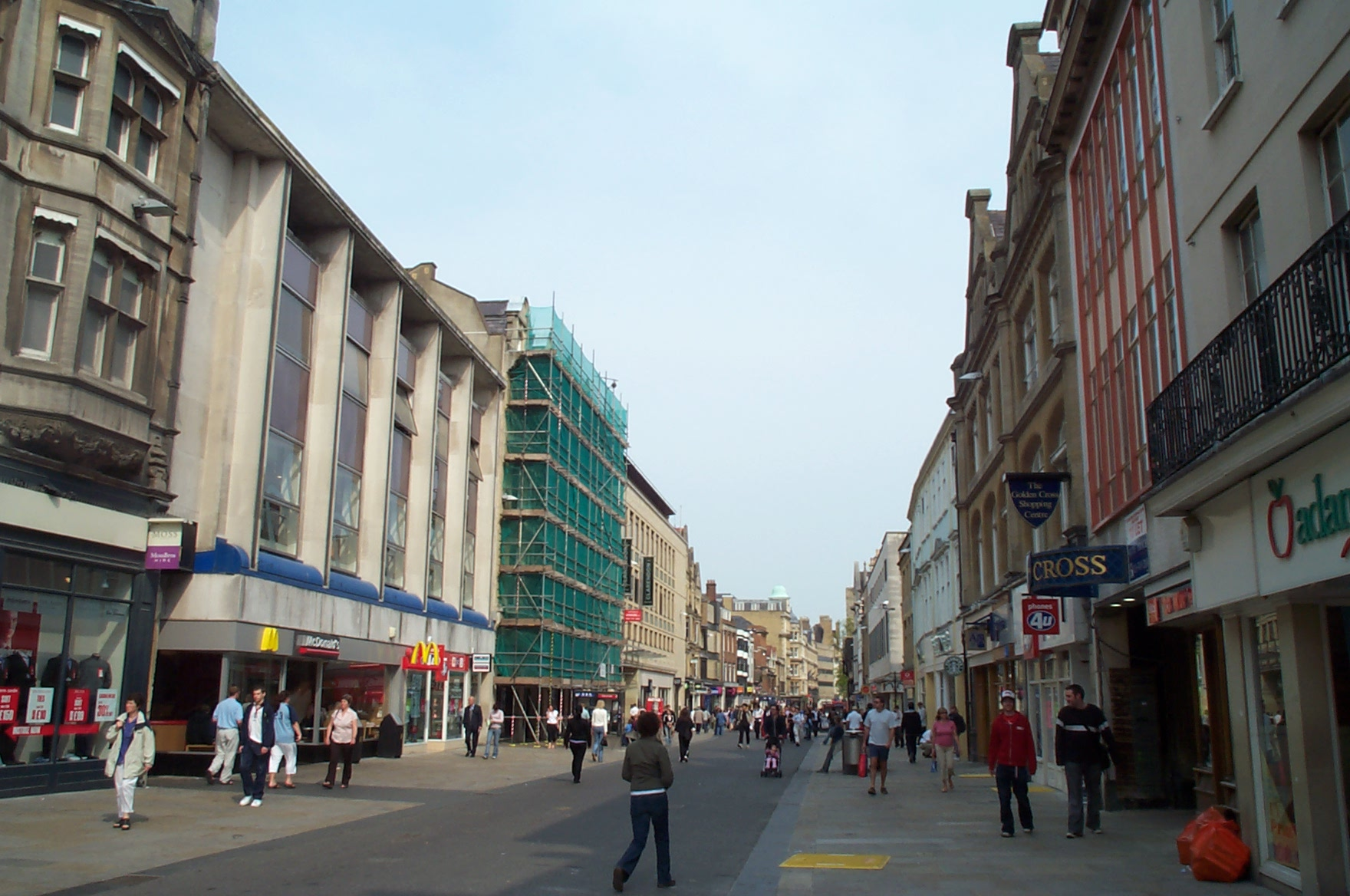
Cornmarket seen from the south (2004)

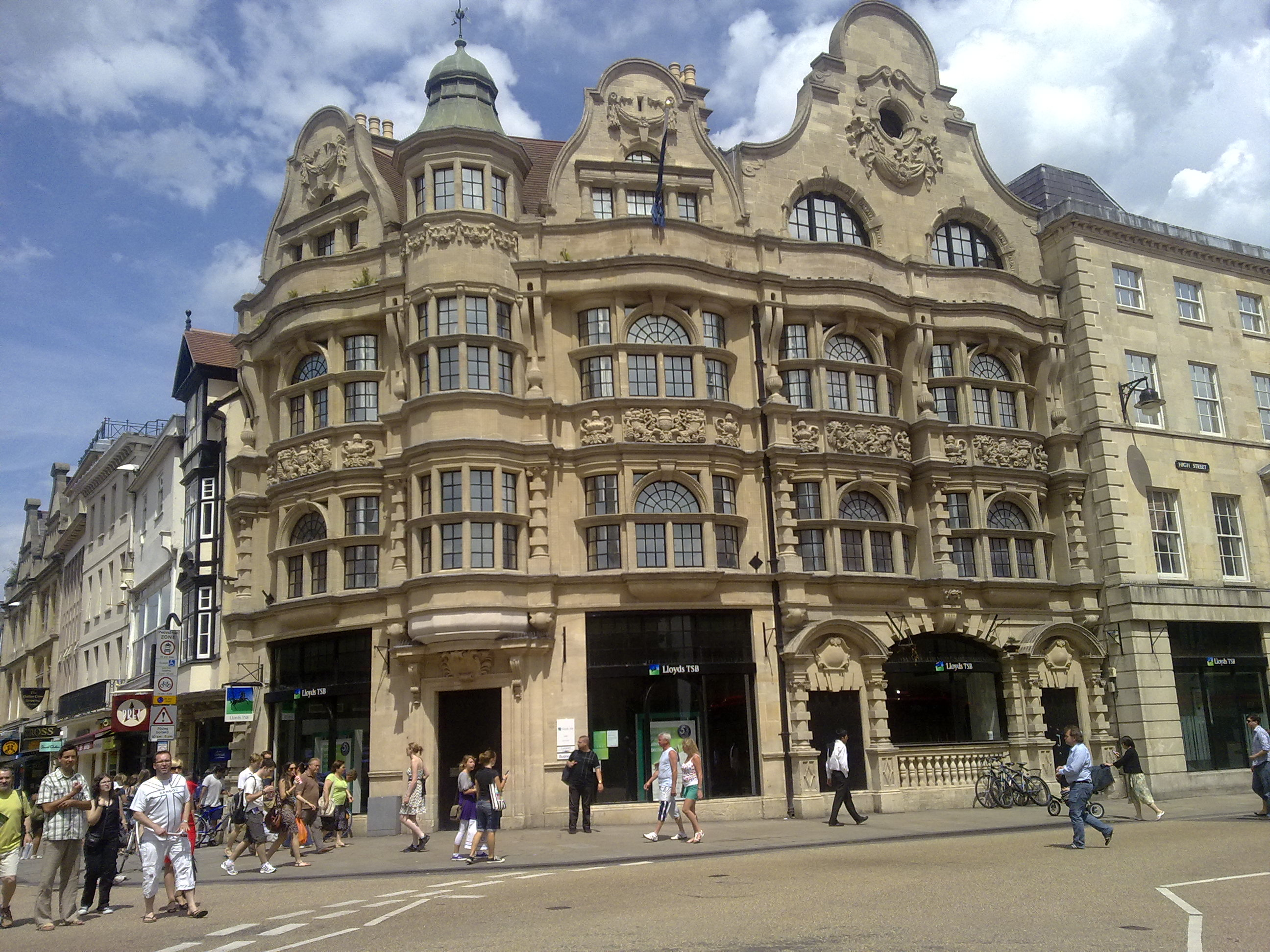
The Lloyds Bank building on the corner of Cornmarket (left) and the High Street (right)

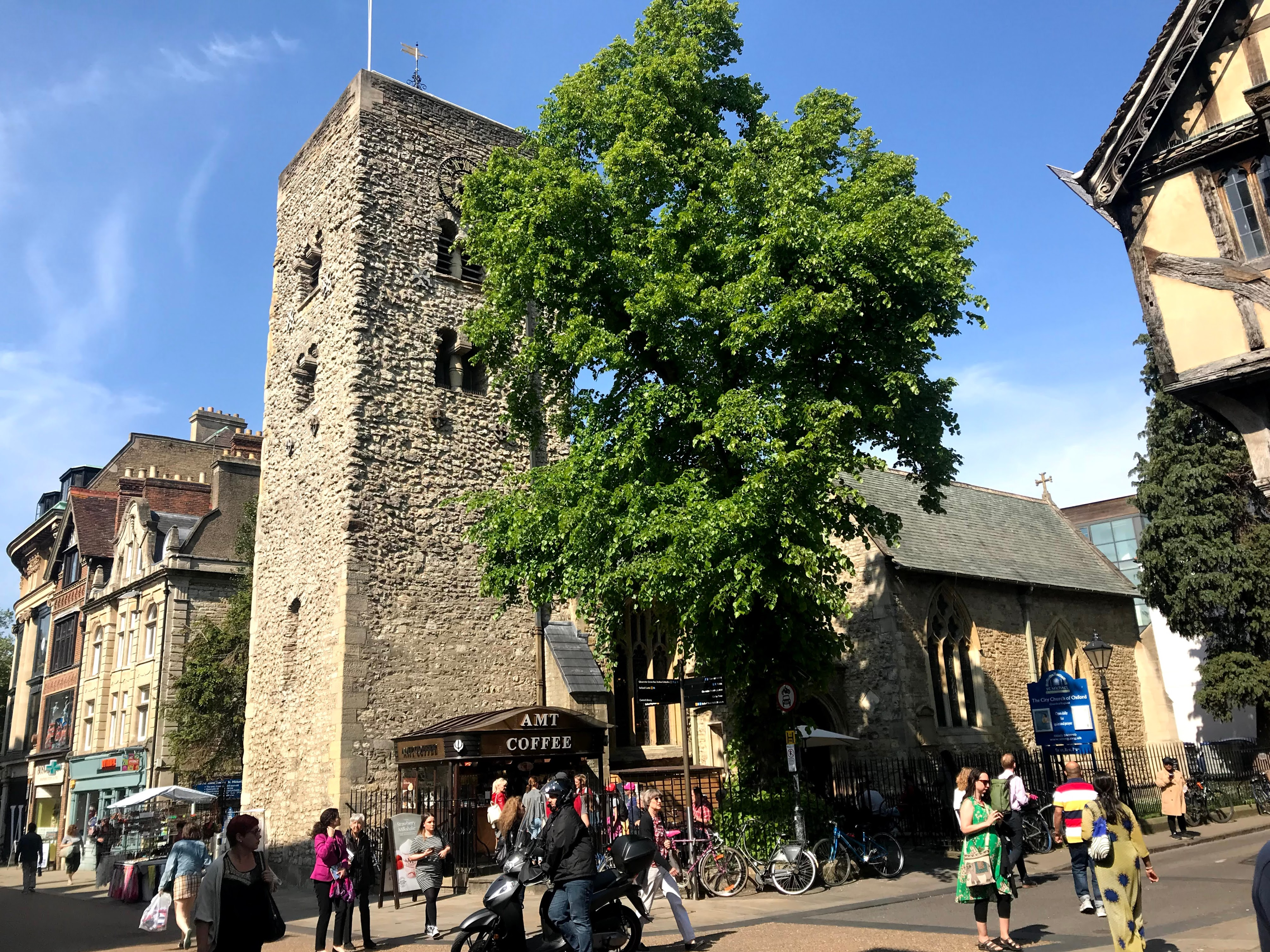
The Saxon tower of St Michael at the North Gate in Cornmarket Street.

== Sources and further reading ==
- Leeds, E.T. (1936). "A Second Elizabethan Mural Painting at No. 3, Cornmarket Street, Oxford". Oxoniensia. I. Oxford Architectural and Historical Society: 144–150.
- Sharp, Thomas (1948). Oxford Replanned. London: The Architectural Press.
- Jope, E. M. (1958). "The Clarendon Hotel Oxford. Part I. The Site". Oxoniensia. XXIII. Oxford Architectural and Historical Society: 1–83.
- Pantin, W.A. (1958). "The Clarendon Hotel Oxford. Part II: The Buildings". Oxoniensia. XXIII. Oxford Architectural and Historical Society: 84–129.
- Rouse, E. Clive (1972). "Some 16th and 17th Century Domestic Paintings in Oxford". Oxoniensia. XXXVII. Oxfordshire Architectural and Historical Society: 198–207.
- Sherwood, Jennifer; Pevsner, Nikolaus (1974). Oxfordshire. The Buildings of England. Harmondsworth: Penguin Books. pp. 311–312. ISBN 0-14-071045-0.
- Sturdy, David; Munby, Julian (1985). "Early Domestic Sites in Oxford: Excavations in Cornmarket and Queen Street, 1959–1962". Oxoniensia. L. Oxfordshire Architectural and Historical Society: 47–94.
- Munby, Julian (1992). "Zacharias's: a 14th Century Oxford New Inn and the Origins of the Medieval Urban Inn". Oxoniensia. LVII. Oxfordshire Architectural and Historical Society: 245–309.
- Tyack, Geoffrey (1998). Oxford An Architectural Guide. Oxford & New York: Oxford University Press. pp. 2, 5, 23, 24, 47, 83, 175–177, 263, 264, 329. ISBN 0-19-817423-3.
