= Llandrinio Bridge =

Grade I listed bridge in Llandrinio, Powys, Wales

Llandrinio Pont Llandrinio Bridge in Wales
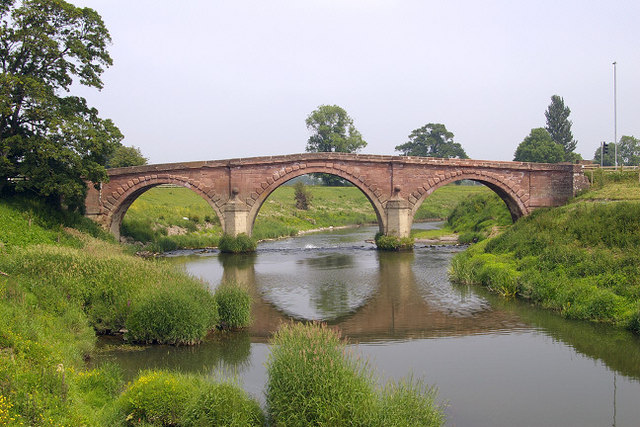
- Coordinates: 52.7459°N 3.0407°W
- Carries: Road traffic
- Crosses: River Severn
- Locale: Llandrinio, Powys, Wales

Characteristics
- Material: Old Red Sandstone
- Total length: 45.00 m (147.64 ft)
- Width: 3.75 m (12.3 ft)
- No. of spans: 3
- Piers in water: 2

History
- Designer: John Gwynn
- Construction start: 1769
- Construction end: 1775

Listed Building – Grade I
- Official name: Llandrinio Bridge
- Designated: 26 October 1953
- Reference no.: 7666

Scheduled monument
- Official name: Llandrinio Bridge
- Designated: 26 October 1953
- Reference no.: MG046

Llandrinio Bridge, Llandrinio, Powys, Wales, is a road bridge over the River Severn. Constructed between 1769 and 1775, the bridge is attributed to John Gwynn of Shrewsbury, a noted local architect who designed a number of crossings over the Severn, as well as Magdalen Bridge in Oxford. The bridge is also the site of defensive structures dating to World War II, including a pillbox disguised as an agricultural cowshed and Dragon's teeth tank traps at its northern end. The bridge is a Grade I listed structure and a Scheduled monument.

== History and description ==
Archdeacon Thomas, in his History of the Parish of Llandrinio published in 1895, suggested that the site of Llandrinio Bridge represented an ancient crossing, and identified a reference to a medieval ferry in a charter of 1309. The present bridge was built between 1769 and 1775, almost certainly to the designs of John Gwynn. (Note: Scourfield and Haslam only go so far as to suggest that the bridge is "probably by John Gywnn", a caution shared by Cadw.) Gwynn, a native of Shrewsbury, designed a number of crossings over the River Severn, including the English Bridge in his home town, and Atcham Bridge in Shropshire. He also worked in Oxford, designing the Covered Market and Magdalen Bridge.

At the outbreak of World War II, plans were made for the defence of Britain in the event of a German invasion. In the west, a defensive line, Western Command Stop Line No.1, followed the line of the Severn from Tewkesbury to Shrewsbury. The line crossed the river at Llandrinio, and the bridge was fortified with a pillbox disguised as an agricultural shed and Dragon's teeth tank traps at its northern end.

The Severn at Llandrinio is susceptible to flooding, which can lead to frequent closure of the bridge. In 2015, particularly severe flooding led to fears that the bridge was at risk of collapse. Subsequent investigations showed that several of the bridge's keystones had been removed by the floodwaters and a major programme of structural repair was required.

On 27 October 2025, the bridge was badly damaged and a section of the parapet knocked into the river following a car crash.

Llandrinio Bridge is constructed of pink sandstone. Three arches span the river at a length of 45 metres. Scourfield and Haslam, in their Powys volume of the Pevsner Buildings of Wales, describe Llandrinio as a "humped narrow roadway, yet a most graceful line when seen from the [river] bank". The bridge is a Grade I listed structure and a Scheduled monument.

== Sources ==
- Scourfield, Robert; Richard, Haslam (2013). Powys: Montgomeryshire, Radnorshire and Breconshire. The Buildings of Wales. New Haven and London: Yale University Press. ISBN 978-0-300-18508-9. OCLC 935421607.
