= Oxford sausage =

Type of pork and veal sausage

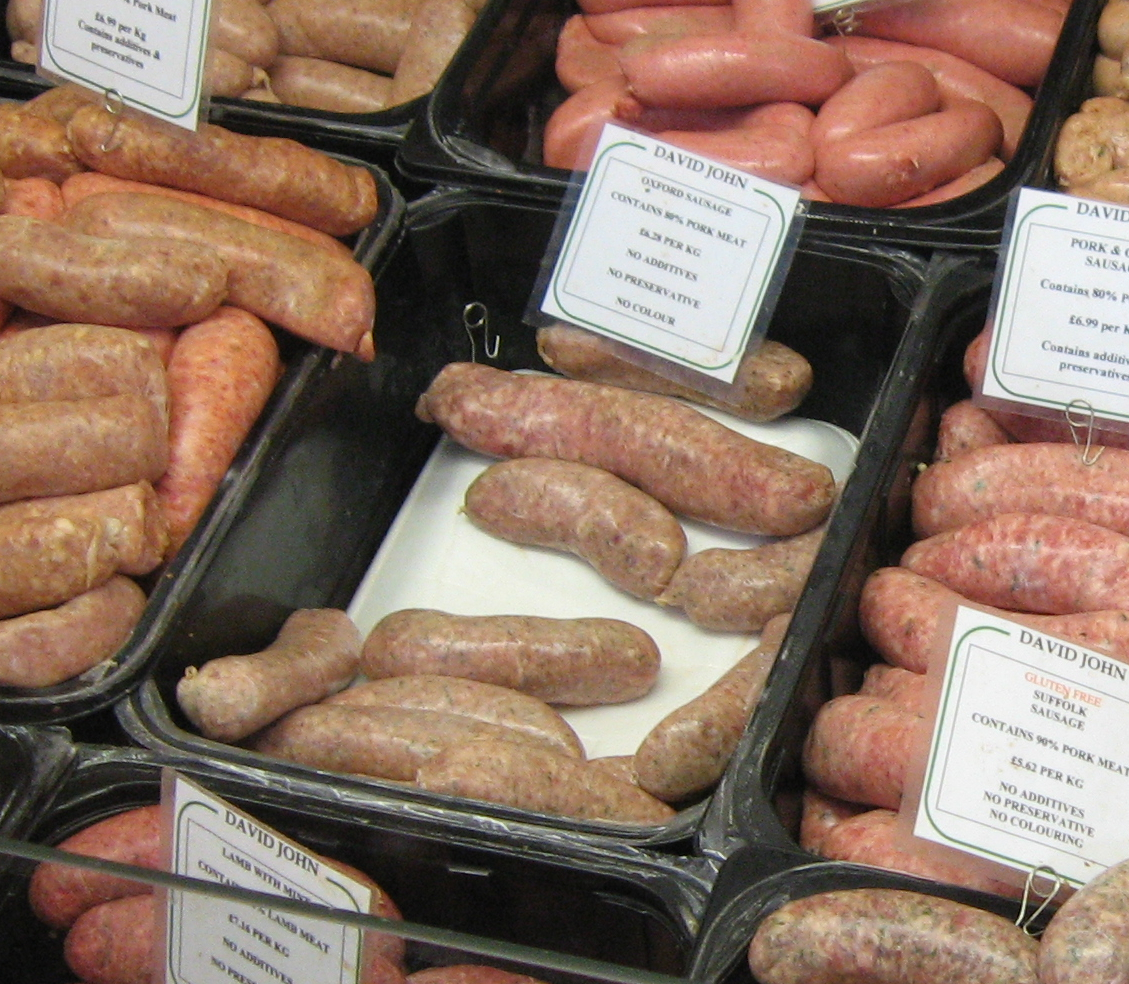
Oxford sausages, on sale in The Covered Market, Oxford.

Oxford sausages are a distinctive variety of pork and veal sausage commonly associated with, and thought to have been developed in, the English city of Oxford. Traditionally, Oxford sausages are noted for the addition of veal, in contrast to many traditional British sausages which contain only pork, and their high level of spice seasoning. References to the "Oxford" style of sausage date back to at least the early 18th century, but it was more widely popularised owing to inclusion in Mrs Beeton's Book of Household Management, first published in 1861.

== History ==
The first published reference to a sausage that closely resembles the modern Oxford sausage is by John Nott in his book The Cook's and Confectioner's Dictionary: Or, the Accomplish'd Housewife's Companion, published in London in 1723. In the text Nott, cook to the Duke of Bolton, refers to the sausages as "Oxford Skates" (or "Kates", as listed in the index). Whether this was a common local recipe or one created by Nott is unclear. By the late 18th century the spice-rich nature of the Oxford sausage had entered popular consciousness to such an extent that Thomas Warton used The Oxford Sausage as the title for his compilation of "highly spiced" political and satirical college verse, first published in 1764 and republished a number of times in the following 50 years. A number of variations on the recipe were published over the years, until Isabella Beeton selected the Oxford style as her exemplar for a typical pork sausage in her 1861 Book of Household Management. With the popularity of this book the recipe reached a much wider audience, and Oxford sausage was for a time available as a canned, processed product. However, with the rise of mass-production, supermarkets and global distribution, the Oxford sausage fell out of favour. The modern rise of local food movements have resulted in the Oxford sausage being revived, albeit in a revised form.

== Ingredients and manufacture ==
As with most regional foodstuffs, different recipes for Oxford sausages vary in many aspects, but all follow a similar ingredient list. The modern Oxford sausage is considered, typically, to consist of a mixture of pork and veal, seasoned with lemon and herbs. Nott's 1723 recipe calls for pork or veal, seasoned with salt, pepper, clove, mace and sage. The spice content also appears in many other late 18th and early 19th century recipes, with mace or nutmeg (derived from the same seed) being a consistent ingredient. Mrs. Beeton's recipe broadly followed the same formula, excepting that a 50:50 mixture of pork and veal is specified, with the addition of a similar quantity of beef suet. Beeton also includes the addition of lemon, although she was not the first to do so. While many modern producers retain a traditional recipe, owing to animal welfare concerns some have replaced the veal content with lamb while others use only pork.

As first produced, the Oxford sausage did not have a skin or other casing, but was hand-formed and floured before frying. However, modern forms are commonly made in a conventional, linked "banger" style, with natural pork or sheep casings. Beeton mentions both methods.

== See also ==
- List of sausages
