= Zacharias and Co. =

Former retailer in Oxford, England

Coordinates: 51.75349°N 1.25836°W

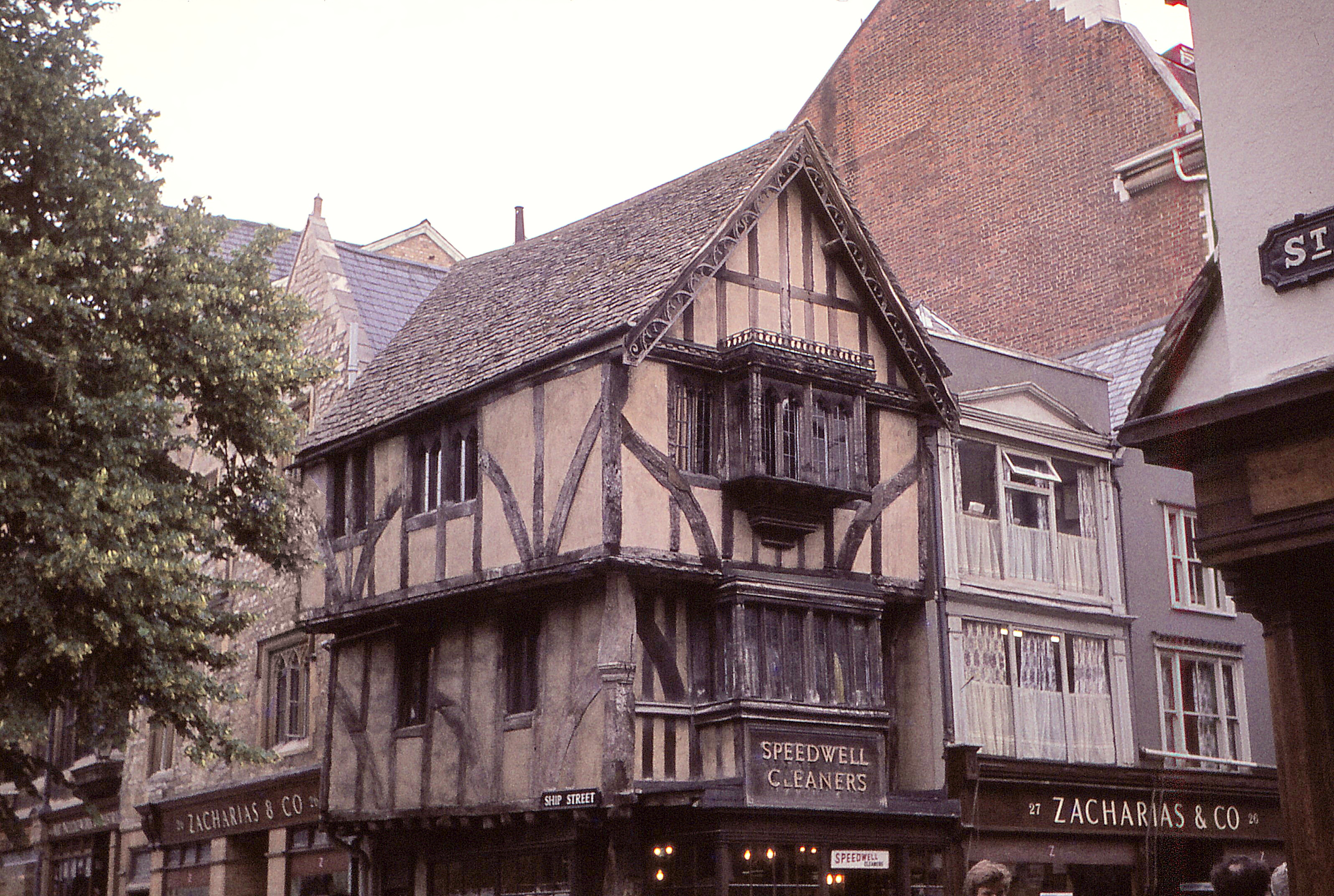
Zacharias and Co., July 1979

Zacharias and Co. (colloquially known as "Zac's") was a waterproof clothing manufacturing firm and retailer based at 26–27 Cornmarket Street Oxford, England.

Abraham Zacharias was a silversmith, jeweller, and watchmaker/clockmaker at 2 Cornmarket and 95 High Street in Oxford.

In the late 1880s, Joel Zacharias expanded the business into 26 Cornmarket next door to the south. The two shops have been combined into a single premises one since this time. By around 1896 Joel Zacharias stopped selling china and glass to concentrate on the waterproof clothing business for which Zacharias and Co. became well known. Joel Zacharias died in 1905 and the business was taken over by Henry Osborn King of Wolvercote.

The slogan "Zac's for Macs" was used by the business.

The site of 26–27 Cornmarket Street subsequently housed a Laura Ashley shop. The building dates from the 15th century. It was completely dismantled and reconstructed closer to its original form. The building is owned by Jesus College, Oxford. The site now houses a Pret a Manger sandwich shop.
