= Golden Cross, Oxford =

Golden Cross
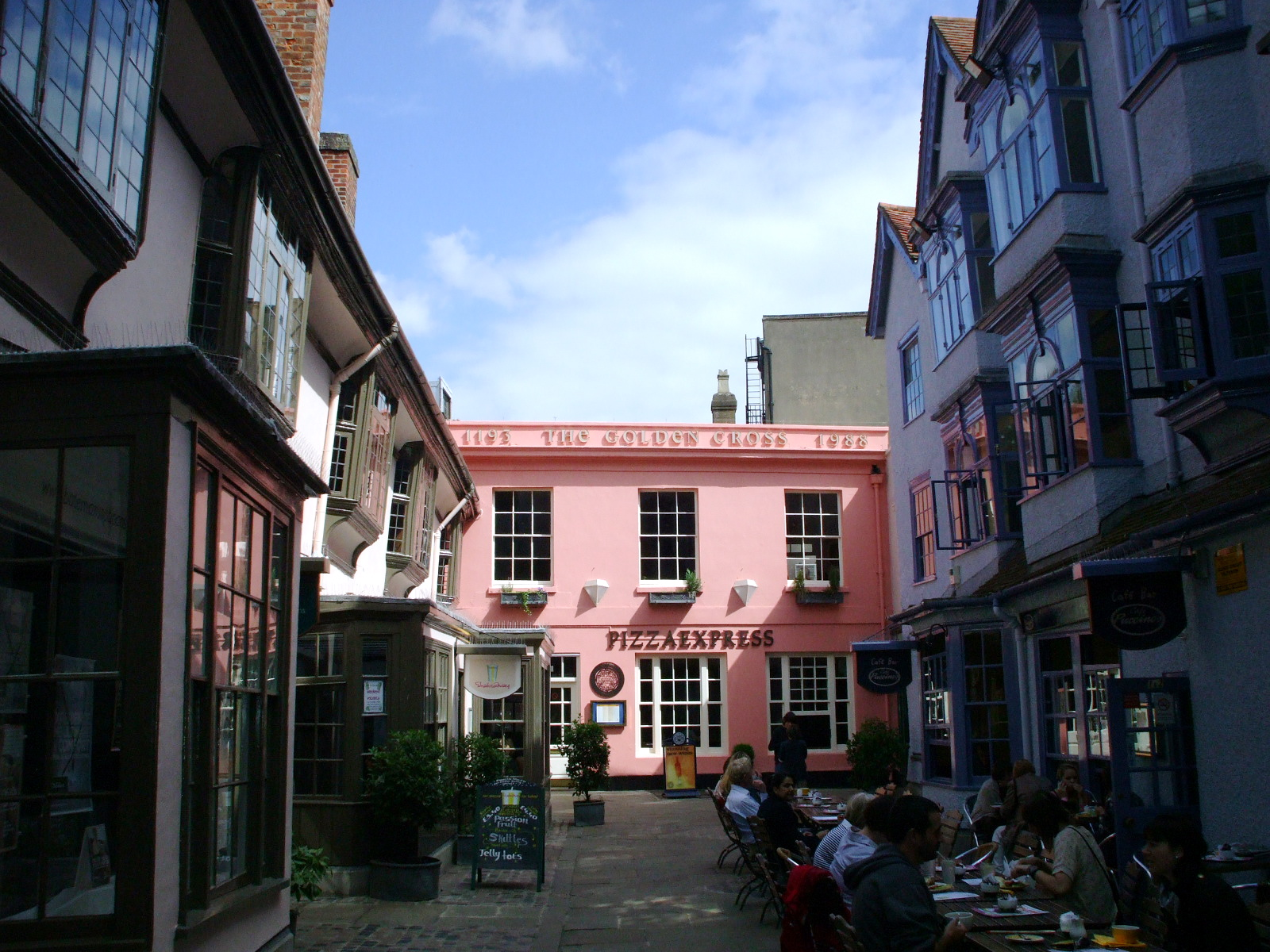
- The Golden Cross from the Cornmarket Street entrance
- Location: Oxford, England
- Coordinates: 51.7524°N 1.2575°W
- Opened: 1987; 39 years ago
- Architect: Dunthorne Parker Architects

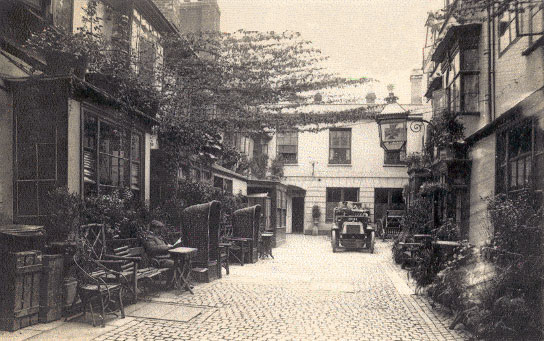
Golden Cross courtyard in 1907, from the Cornmarket entrance.

Golden Cross (also previously known as the Cross Inn) is a shopping arcade at 5 Cornmarket Street in central Oxford, England. The original structure on the site dates from 1193, when it was called Maugershall after the then owner, and consisted of shops with an inn on the upper storeys. The buildings now on the site date from the late 15th century, when they were used as a traditional coaching inn. The former Golden Cross Hotel is a Grade I listed building. The building at the end of the courtyard is now a branch of Pizza Express. The courtyard is used as a thoroughfare which leads to the historic Covered Market and has been redeveloped as a small shopping centre.

There is strong but circumstantial evidence to link the buildings with William Shakespeare, given his player's company's known performances in Oxford and the route from Stratford-on-Avon to London passing through Oxford. It is believed that Hamlet was performed in the inn courtyard and a signature that is reputedly his can be seen on the wall in the bursar's office on the first floor of the adjacent building occupied by New College, Oxford.

The buildings were restored in 1986–1987 when the buildings were converted into a variety of retail uses, and a new structure integrated into the existing building ranges to allow for a direct route through to the adjacent Covered Market. This covered market was constructed in 1774 so as to relocate the stalls previously pitched on the Cornmarket. but no direct access had been possible from the main retail street of Cornmarket up until the completion of this development.

The poet Alexander Pope stayed here in 1735. The 15th-century buildings have original timberwork and there are various examples of early wall paintings and hand-painted wallpaper on the upper floors of the building, still easily accessible and viewable via the pizza restaurant that currently occupies the upper floors of the north range of buildings.

== See also ==
- Clarendon Shopping Centre
- Westgate Shopping Centre
