= Llandrinio =

Human settlement in Powys, Wales

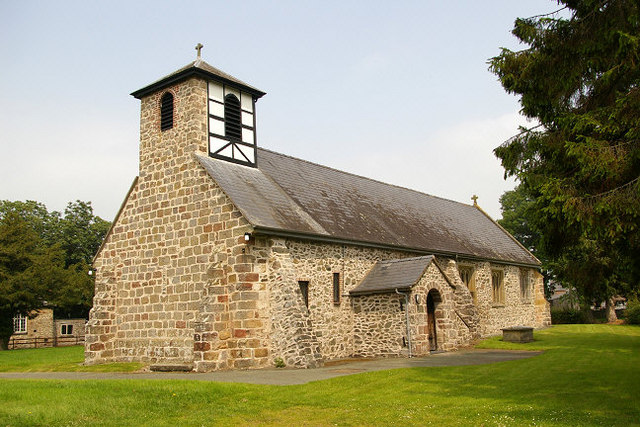
- The Church of St Trunio

- Location within Powys
- Population: 2,191 (2011 census)
- OS grid reference: SJ292173
- Principal area: Powys
- Preserved county: Powys
- Country: Wales
- Sovereign state: United Kingdom
- Post town: WELSHPOOL
- Postcode district: SY21
- Post town: LLANYMYNECH
- Postcode district: SY22
- Dialling code: 01691
- Police: Dyfed-Powys
- Fire: Mid and West Wales
- Ambulance: Welsh
- UK Parliament: Montgomeryshire and Glyndŵr
- Senedd Cymru – Welsh Parliament: Montgomeryshire
- List of places UK Wales Powys 52.748964°N 3.0501384°W Community map: Map of the community

Llandrinio is a small village and community in Montgomeryshire, Powys, Wales, close to the Wales-England border. It is situated on the B4393 road which travels from the village of Ford, Shropshire to Lake Vyrnwy. The community, Llandrinio and Arddleen includes Arddlin and a small part of Four Crosses, Powys.

At the 2011 census, Llandrinio community had a population of 1,485.

The mainly Norman church of St Trunio is a Grade II* listed building.

The village has a village hall and a playing field, which is used by the local cricket team and the junior football teams. The annual carnival has been opened by well-known faces such as actor Ryan Thomas.

The River Severn and Offa's Dyke both run through the village. The river is crossed by Llandrinio Bridge which leads to the hamlet of Crew Green, about a mile east of the village and close to English border. The village is also road linked to the towns of Welshpool, Oswestry, Newtown and Shrewsbury.

== Governance ==
An electoral ward in the same name exists. This ward had a population of 2,191 at the 2011 Census.
