= John Gwynn (architect) =

English architect and civil engineer

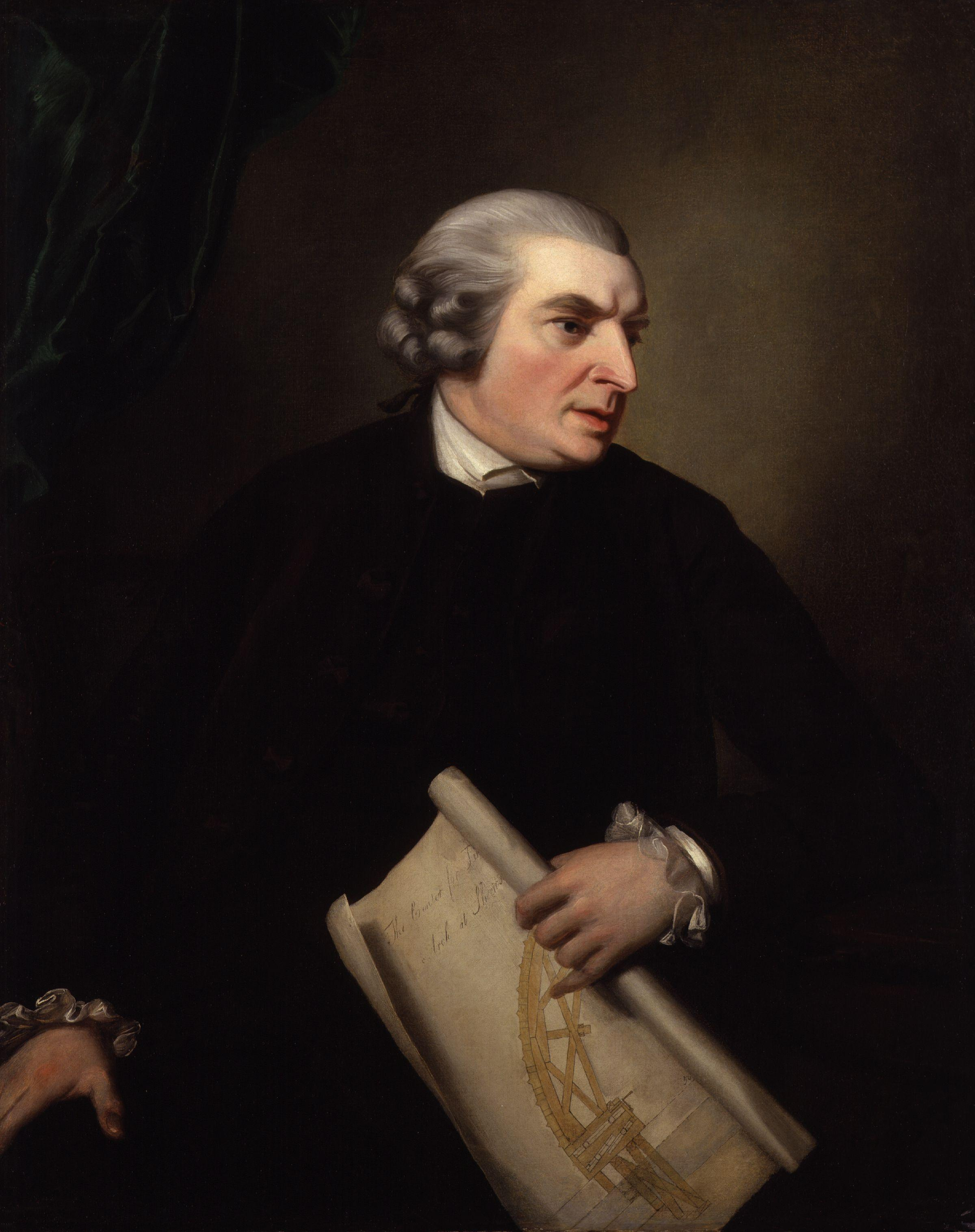
John Gwynn

John Gwynn RA (1713 – 28 February 1786) was an English architect and civil engineer, who became one of the founder members of the Royal Academy in 1768. He advocated greater control over planning in London, for which he produced detailed suggestions. His buildings include Magdalen Bridge and the Covered Market in Oxford, and several bridges over the River Severn.

== Life ==
Gwynn was born and died in Shrewsbury, Shropshire. He worked initially as a carpenter, but then decided to practice as a (largely self-taught) architect and town planner, moving to London, where he became a friend of Samuel Johnson.

In 1749, when Sir Christopher Wren's drawings were sold, Gwynn obtained Wren's plan for the rebuilding of the City of London, and published it, adding some comments of his own. Seventeen years later, in 1766, he published London and Westminster Improved, It was passed in June of the same year. in which he criticised the loose control over building in the West End, saying that "the finest part of town is left to ignorant and capricious persons", and called for development to be controlled by a general plan. He made more than a hundred suggestions for improvements to the capital. They included the rebuilding of London Bridge; the construction of a "St, George's Bridge" in the position where Waterloo Bridge was eventually built; a "King's Square" on the site of the Royal Mews (later occupied by Trafalgar Square); a royal palace in Hyde Park; a street following a route close to that of Nash's later Regent Street and quays along both sides of the Thames. The Quarterly Review noted in 1826 that

No part of his ingenious design, however, was adopted: the publication does not appear to have produced any public interest at the time; and Mr. Gwynn has been so little thought of since that his designs lately brought forward as original conceptions.

However proposals similar to many of Gwynn's were eventually implemented; in the twentieth century, John Summerson wrote that "the amazing thing about this plan is its complete grip on reality", his only impractical belief being that the growth of London could be stopped at Hyde Park in the west and at the Marylebone Road in the north.

Gwynn influenced the drafting of the Building Act 1774 (Note: Some works describe Gwynn as a key figure in the introduction of the Building Act 1774, but the source of this claim is elusive.) which improved standards of materials and workmanship – Bedford Square was one of the first areas of London to benefit.

In 1759, he unsuccessfully submitted a design to the competition for the new Blackfriars Bridge. Samuel Johnson lobbied on his behalf, sending three letters in his support to the Daily Gazetteer, but plans by Robert Mylne were preferred. He was particularly associated with projects in Oxford, including Magdalen Bridge (1772–90), the city's workhouse (1772–73) and the Covered Market (1774), and with bridges across the River Severn including the "English Bridge", in his native Shrewsbury (1769), and others at Atcham (1769–71), Llandrinio (1769-1775) and Worcester (1781)

He was one of the foundation members of the Royal Academy in 1768, Samuel Wale, the academy's first professor of perspective had at one time been his assistant.

An anonymous publication of 1742 entitled The Art of Architecture: A Poem In Imitation of Horace's Art of Poetry has been generally attributed to Gwynn.

He died in Shrewsbury in 1786.

== Sources ==
- Hodgson, J. E.; Eaton, Frederick A. (1905). The Royal Academy and its Members 1768-1830. London: John Murray.
- Summerson, John (1962) [1945]. Georgian London (revised ed.). Harmondsworth: Penguin Books.
