= Boswells of Oxford =

Coordinates: 51.7541°N 1.2583°W

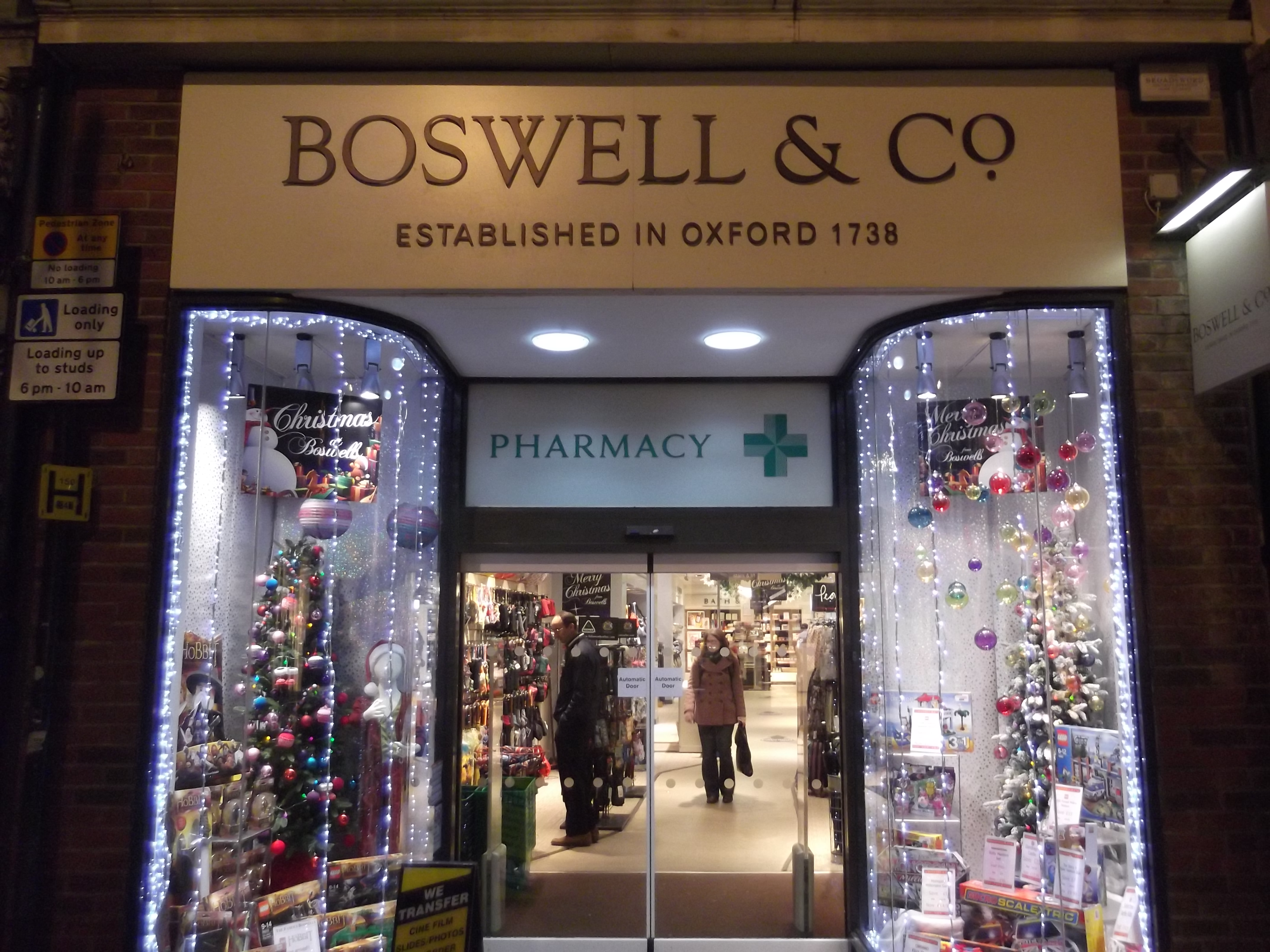
Entrance to the Boswells store on Cornmarket Street at night

Boswells of Oxford was the largest independent family-run department store in Oxford, England. The store first traded in 1738 and was the second oldest family-owned department store in the world. It closed in 2020. The company did not use an apostrophe in its name, although others sometimes mistakenly do so.

Founded by Francis Boswell, the store was originally located at 50 Cornmarket Street. Boswells started up in business manufacturing and selling luggage and trunks, and it is believed their wares were taken on Captain Cook's trip to explore the Southern Hemisphere.

The business remained in the Boswell family until 1890, when there was no one left for direct succession. The ownership then passed to Arthur Pearson, the owner of the Oxford Drug Company. Ownership of both Boswells and the Oxford Drug Company remained in the Pearson family and, unusually for a department store, Boswells contained a pharmacy. The store building, Boswell House, with the address 1–4 Broad Street, was constructed in 1929, with its main entrance opposite Balliol College and close to the spot (marked with a cross in the middle of the road) where the Oxford Martyrs were burnt at the stake in the 16th century; the building incorporated the Martyrs' Bastion from the former Oxford city wall. It replaced small shops on the site of Treadwell Passage, an alley which had been notorious in the 19th century. In 1958 it was joined to the Oxford Drug Company building at the north end of Cornmarket Street, providing a side entrance to the department store.

The store was traditional in style and a local shopping landmark, particularly for toys, kitchenware, and luggage, continuing the tradition from 1738. In 2014, Boswells launched an e-commerce website to replace a purely marketing website and sold products from all its departments online. In 2015, the store expanded upstairs to create a new tearoom and customer toilets, and in 2018 added a takeaway cafe. The store departments were:

- Basement – Cookshop and Kitchen Electricals, Hardware, Household Essentials, Lighting, Small Electricals, Tableware
- Ground Floor – Cosmetics, Accessories, Umbrellas and Bags, Gifts, Luggage, Pharmacy, Tourism, Broad Street Cafe
- First Floor – 1738 Tearoom, Toys and Games
- Second Floor – Bedding and Bathrooms, Customer Toilets, Haberdashery, Parcel Collection point

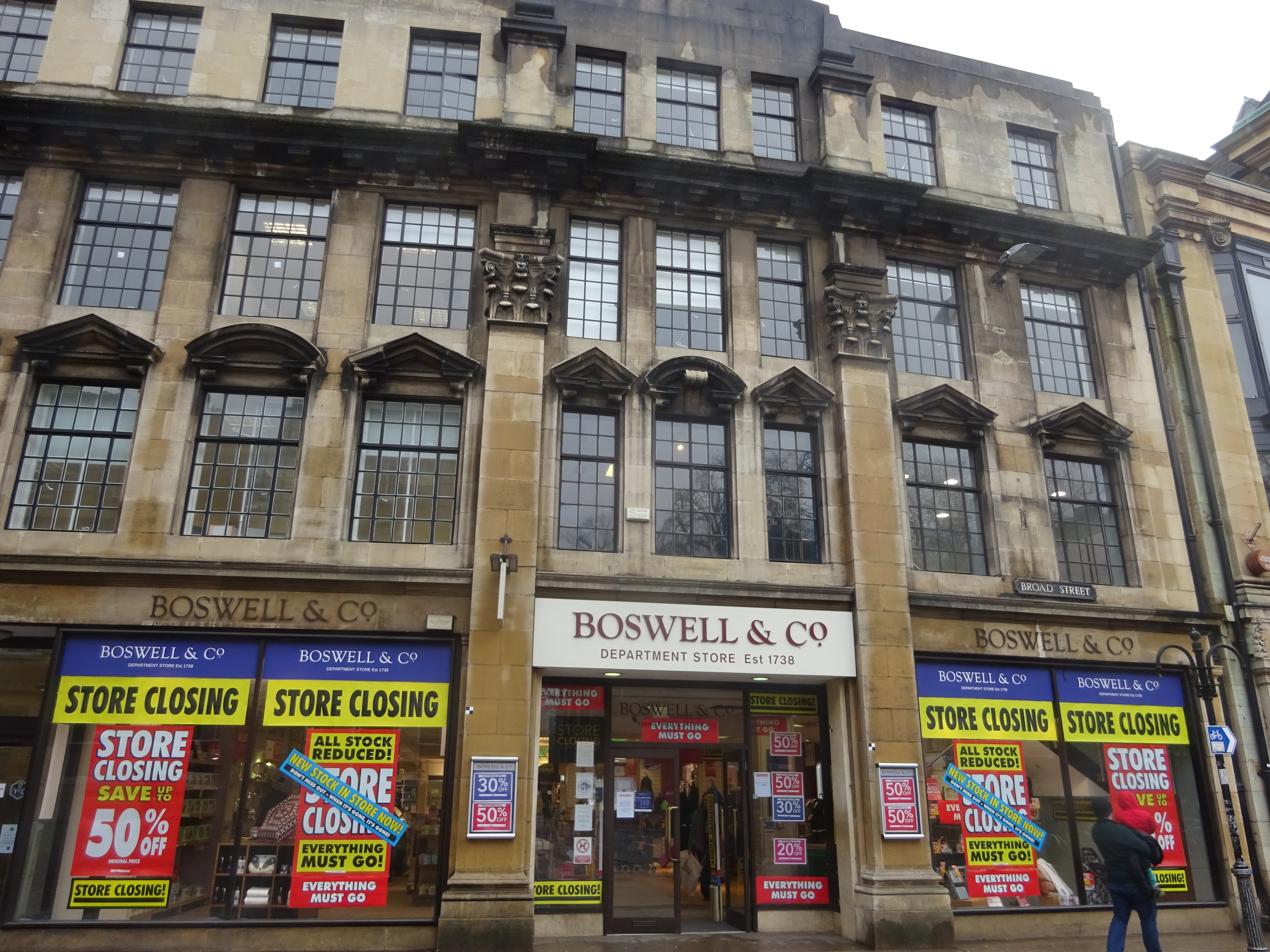
Boswells closing down sale in 2020, view on Broad Street

In 2020, there was a closing down sale after 282 years of trading. The COVID-19 pandemic brought forward the closure of the store. The store closed due to the crisis, apart from the pharmacy, which closed on 11 April 2020.

The building has been converted to a luxury hotel, The Store Oxford, which opened in 2024.

== Bibliography ==
- Bax, Andrew, ed. (2019). The Boswells Connection: Stories linked to Oxford's oldest store. Bombus Books. ISBN 978-178456-642-5.
