= Samuel Wale =

English painter

Samuel Wale RA (1721? – 1786) was an English historical painter and book illustrator.

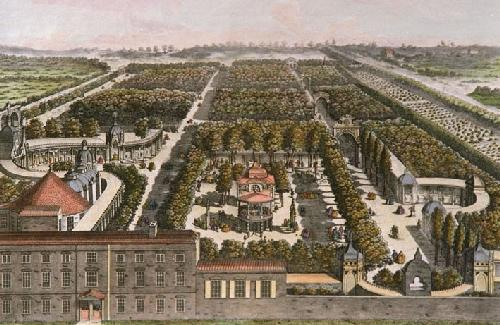
View of Vauxhall Gardens, about 1751.

== Life ==
He is said to have been born at Great Yarmouth, Norfolk, possibly on 25 April 1721, to Samuel and Margaret Wale, though some sources indicate he was born in London. He was first trained in the art of engraving on silver plate. He then studied drawing under Francis Hayman at the St. Martin's Lane academy. Wale assisted John Gwynn in his architectural drawings, especially in a transverse section of St Paul's Cathedral, which was engraved and published in their joint names in 1752.

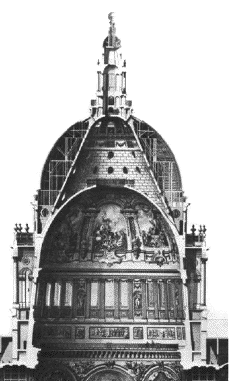
St Paul's Cathedral, with John Gwynn.

He became one of the original members of the Society of Artists of Great Britain in 1765 and of the Royal Academy in 1768, and was the first professor of perspective to the Academy. He exhibited drawings of scenes from English history, and occasionally scriptural subjects, described as designs for altar-pieces, from 1769 to 1778, when he suffered from a paralytic stroke, and he was placed on the Royal Academy pension fund, the first member who benefited by it. He continued to hold the professorship of perspective, though he gave private instruction at his own house instead of lecturing; and in 1782, on the death of Richard Wilson, he became librarian. He held both offices until his death on 6 February 1786. Unmarried and childless, he left his copperplates, prints, and belongings to his friend and fellow founder of the Royal Academy, architect John Gwynn, with whom he shared his house, and his nurse, Mrs. Mary Gurpin. He was buried in St. Martin-in-the-Fields. His portrait appears in Johann Zoffany's picture of the Royal Academy in 1772, engraved by Richard Earlom.

== Works ==
He painted some decorative designs for ceilings at a time when the taste for that style of ornamentation was on the wane, and he was occasionally employed in painting tradesmen's signs, till these were prohibited by act of parliament in 1762. A full-length portrait of Shakespeare by Wale, which hung across the street outside a tavern near Drury Lane, obtained some notoriety owing to the splendour of the frame and the ironwork by which it was suspended. It had scarcely been erected when it had to be removed.

His main work was in designing vignettes and illustrations on a small scale for the booksellers; a large number these were engraved by Charles Grignion the Elder. Among them were the illustrations to the ‘History of England,’ 1746–7; ‘The Compleat Angler,’ 1759; ‘London and its Environs described,’ 1761; ‘Ethic Tales and Fables,’ William Wilkie's ‘Fables,’ 1768 (eighteen plates); Henry Chamberlain's ‘History of London,’ 1770; and Oliver Goldsmith's ‘Traveller,’ 1774. His book illustrations show Hayman's influence.

He also published numerous plates in the Oxford Magazine and other periodicals. He exhibited ‘stained drawings,’ i.e. designs outlined with the pen and washed with indian ink, and occasionally larger drawings in watercolours, at the exhibitions of the Society of Artists in Spring Gardens, 1760–1767, and designed the frontispiece to the catalogue in 1762.
