= Roy Sebag =

Israeli-Canadian investor (born 1985)

- Born: June 28, 1985 (age 40)
- Occupation(s): Entrepreneur, investor
- Years active: 2008–present
- Known for: GoldMoney Inc (formerly BitGold), Menē

Roy Sebag (born June 28, 1985) is an Israeli-Canadian contrarian investor, entrepreneur and author. He is the founder of precious metal savings and payments platform GoldMoney Inc, and is Chief Executive Officer. He is also the founder of cryptomining company Bitfarms, Ltd. a publicly traded company on the Toronto Stock Exchange, and was its CEO until April 2019.

== Career ==
=== Investments ===
In 2011, Sebag was a managing partner of Essentia Equity, one of several lenders that invested $43 million of rescue financing into American Apparel helping the company avert bankruptcy, but the company later went bankrupt. In September 2012, Sebag invested in German automotive company Porsche Automobil Holding SE. In an interview with the financial newspaper Barron's, Sebag argued that the legal overhang due to the 2008 short squeeze of Volkswagen provided a unique opportunity to purchase shares of Porsche at a discount.

=== Natural Resource Holdings ===
In 2010, Sebag formed Natural Resource Holdings, an asset consolidator of historically delineated natural resource deposits.

Since 2011, Sebag and Natural Resource Holdings have been compiling and distributing a database of the world's largest gold mines.

=== Goldmoney Inc. ===
Following the 2008 financial crisis, Sebag met Josh Crumb, a senior metals strategist at Goldman Sachs, and the two developed the idea of a full-reserve banking gold-based financial institution. This ultimately led to the formation and launch of BitGold, which subsequently became GoldMoney, after BitGold acquired that company in 2015 as a reverse merger. In May 2016, Sebag won the Canadian Capital Markets Deal of the Year Award for the GoldMoney acquisition. In March 2019, GoldMoney announced it was shutting down its cryptocurrency business.

=== Menē Inc. ===
In October 2016, Sebag founded Menē Inc., a luxury online jewelry venture, along with Diana Widmaier Picasso, the granddaughter of Pablo Picasso.

=== Industry analysis ===
Sebag's economic insights have been covered by CNBC, Bloomberg, The Wall Street Journal and in an article written by him for The American Mind.

== Author ==
Sebag is the author of 'The Natural Order of Money', a book of Economic Theory and Philosophy about the intrinsic relationship between people, money, and nature.
