= Thomas Sharp (town planner) =

English urban planner and writer (1901–1978)

Thomas Wilfred Sharp (12 April 1901 – 27 January 1978) was an English town planner and writer on the built environment.

== Biography ==
Sharp was born in Bishop Auckland in County Durham, England. He attended the local grammar school and, between 1918 and 1922, spent four years working for the borough surveyor. He then moved to Margate, Kent, to work on the town's development plan, before working in Canterbury and London where he worked for the planning consultants Thomas Adams and Francis Longstreth Thompson. His next post was as regional planning assistant to the South West Lancashire Regional Advisory Group, but after credit for his lengthy report was given, as was traditional, to the honorary surveyor, he angrily resigned, and was unable to find work for two years.

Sharp used this enforced leisure to write Town and Countryside (1932), which established him as a formidable polemicist. He challenged the garden city movement, which sought to unite town and country, by insisting on their separate individual qualities. He finished the book in the family home in County Durham, an area which, with its contrasts between deprived coal mining areas and the fine architecture of the city of Durham, was a lifelong inspiration to him. As a consultant, he advised on the protection of the city from development that would compromise its environmental quality.

Sharp loved the urban architecture of Renaissance and medieval towns. He thought the man-made landscape of England the most beautiful in the world and the English village as the perfection of the village idea. His thoughts in this area were expressed in English Panorama (1936), written after an unplanned move into the University of Durham's architectural department in Newcastle. Here also he edited the Shell Guide to Northumberland and Durham (1937) and wrote his celebrated Town Planning (1940), a Pelican Book that sold 250,000 copies.

Between 1941 and 1943, Sharp worked in London, as a senior officer in the Ministry of Works and Planning, and made a major contribution to the Scott report which laid the foundations for post-war countryside protection. Sharp later wrote The Anatomy of the Village (1946), which became a classic on the subject of village design. His notions of townscape, then a novel concept, were perfected in his analyses of historic towns and cities – notably Durham, Exeter, Oxford, Salisbury and Chichester – for which he wrote development plans just before and then after the end of the war. After a brief return to Durham to found the first undergraduate town planning course in the country, he returned to establish his own planning consultancy in Oxford, and was personally disappointed when Durham University failed to appoint him as its first chair of town planning.

Sharp became president of the Town Planning Institute in 1945–6, and of the Institute of Landscape Architects in 1949–51. He was appointed CBE in 1951. However, as a consultant based in Oxford, Sharp's inability to compromise made work hard to find. He spent much of his time writing poems and novels, for the most part unpublished. His last book on planning was Town and Townscape (1968).

He married Rachel Dorothy Morrison in 1963; they had no children. She survived him following his death in Oxford in 1978, aged 76.

== Published works ==
- Town and Countryside: Some Aspects of Urban and Rural Development. Oxford: Oxford University Press. 1932.
- English Panorama. London: J.M. Dent & Sons. 1936.
- Northumberland and Durham – a Shell Guide. B.T. Batsford. 1937.
- Town Planning. Harmondsworth: Pelican Books. 1940.
- Cathedral City: A Plan for Durham. London: The Architectural Press. 1944.
- Exeter Phoenix: A Plan for Rebuilding. London: The Architectural Press. 1946.
- The Anatomy of the Village. Harmondsworth: Penguin Books. 1946.
- Oxford Replanned. London: The Architectural Press. 1948.
- Georgian City: A plan for the preservation and improvement of Chichester. London: The Architectural Press. 1949.
- Newer Sarum: A plan for Salisbury. London: The Architectural Press. 1949.
- Town and Townscape. John Murray. 1968. ISBN 0-7195-1799-0.
