= Covered Market, Oxford =

Historic market in central Oxford, England

Coordinates: 51.7527°N 1.2567°W

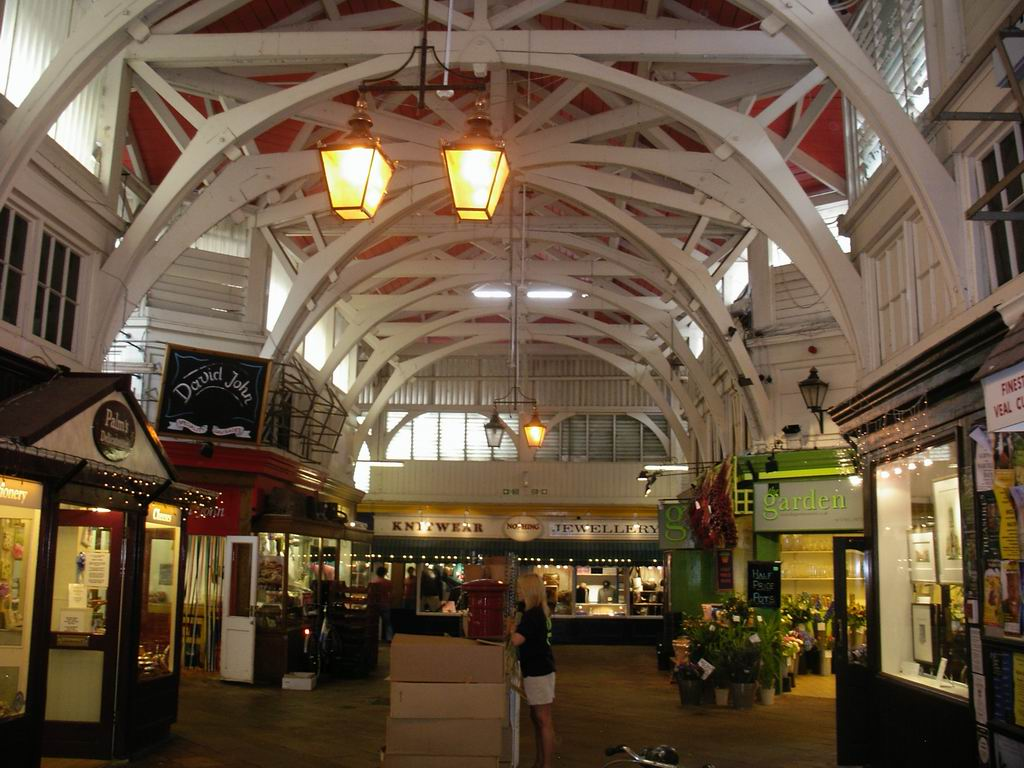
Inside the Covered Market

The Covered Market is a historic market with permanent stalls and shops in a large covered structure in central Oxford, England. It was designated a Grade II listed building in 2000.

== Location ==
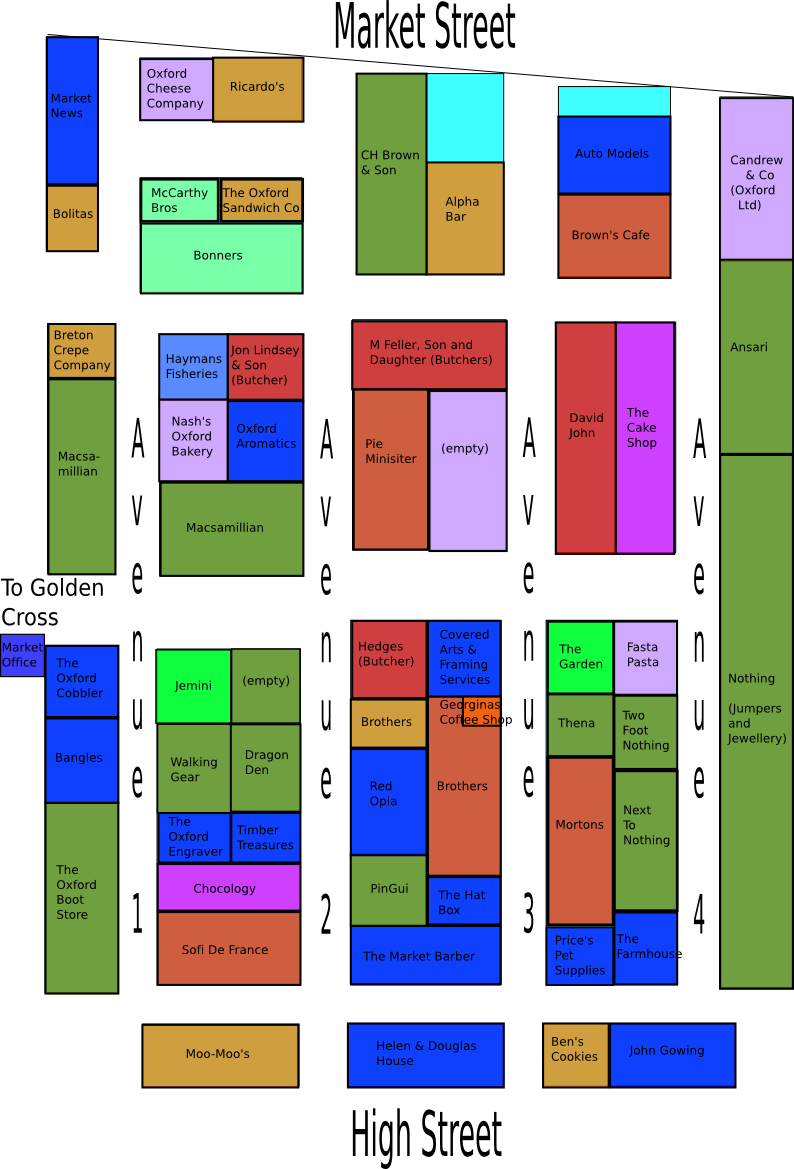
Map of the Covered Market

The market is located to the north of the High Street towards the western end between Cornmarket Street and Turl Street. To the north is Market Street. Most of the entrances are from the High Street and Market Street (with four entrances from each street). It is also possible to gain access from Cornmarket via the Golden Cross alley, with its small up-market shops.

== History ==
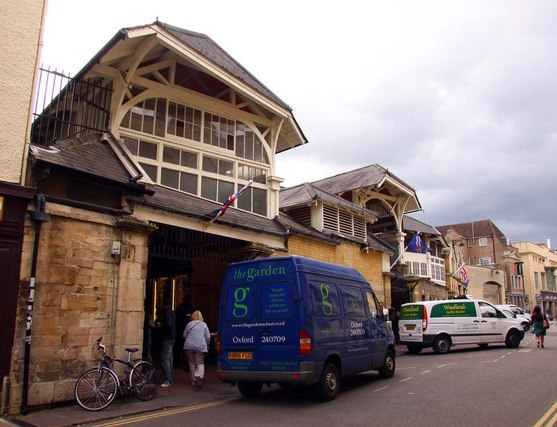
Northern entrance to the Covered Market.

The Covered Market was officially opened on 1 November 1774 and remains in use. It was established in response to a general wish to clear 'untidy, messy and unsavoury stalls' from the main streets of central Oxford.

John Gwynn, the architect of Magdalen Bridge, drew up the plans and designed the High Street front with its four entrances. In 1772, the newly formed Market committee, half of whose members came from the town and half from the university, accepted an estimate of nine hundred and sixteen pounds ten shillings, for the building of twenty butchers' shops.

Twenty more soon followed, and after 1773 meat was allowed to be sold only inside the market. From this nucleus, the market grew, with stalls for garden produce, pig meat, dairy products and fish.

== Today ==
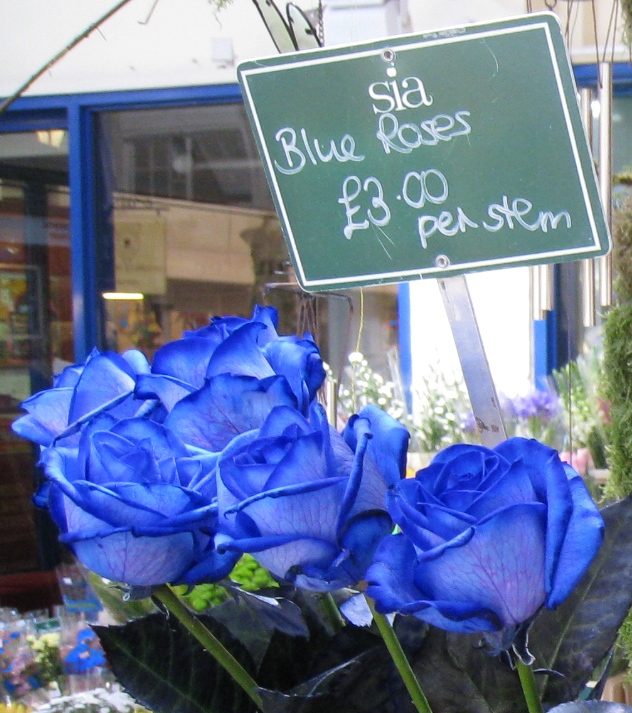
Some of the stalls sell rather unusual items

Today the covered market is still home to numerous traders, around half being food retailers, including market shops selling fresh food such as greengrocers and butchers (including some producing the Oxford sausage). There are also newer gift shops, bakeries and sandwich shops. Most of the shops are larger than the original stall sizes, with the result there are fewer businesses in the covered market than in the past.

The Covered Market may be accessed via the four entrances on the High Street, via Golden Cross (from Cornmarket), and from three entrances on Market Street.

In 2017, Oxford City Council, which owns the Covered Market, announced a £1.6m investment in the fabric of the building, including roof repairs, improved public conveniences, external paving and new signage.

In May 2017, the Covered Market received 'the Royal seal of approval' when it was visited by Prince Charles and the Duchess of Cornwall.

== Gallery ==
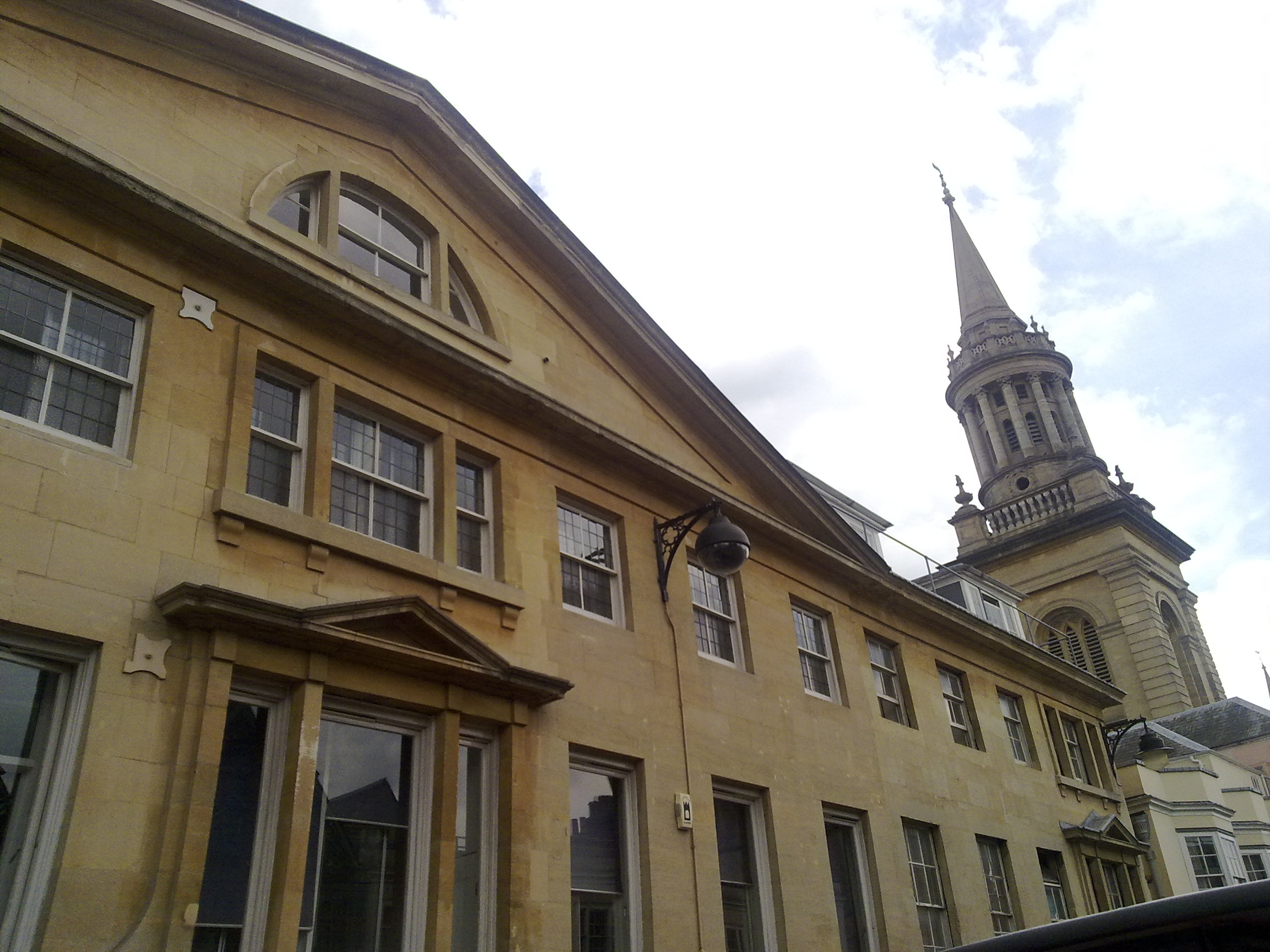
The Covered Market from the High Street looking towards All Saints Church

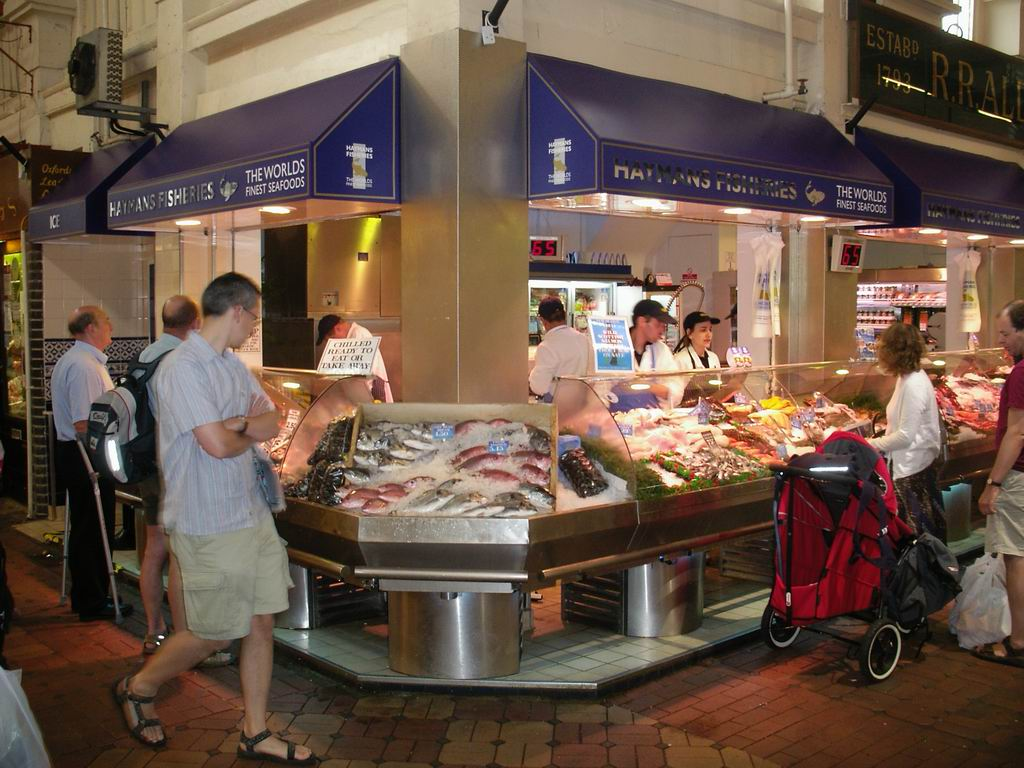
A fish store in the market

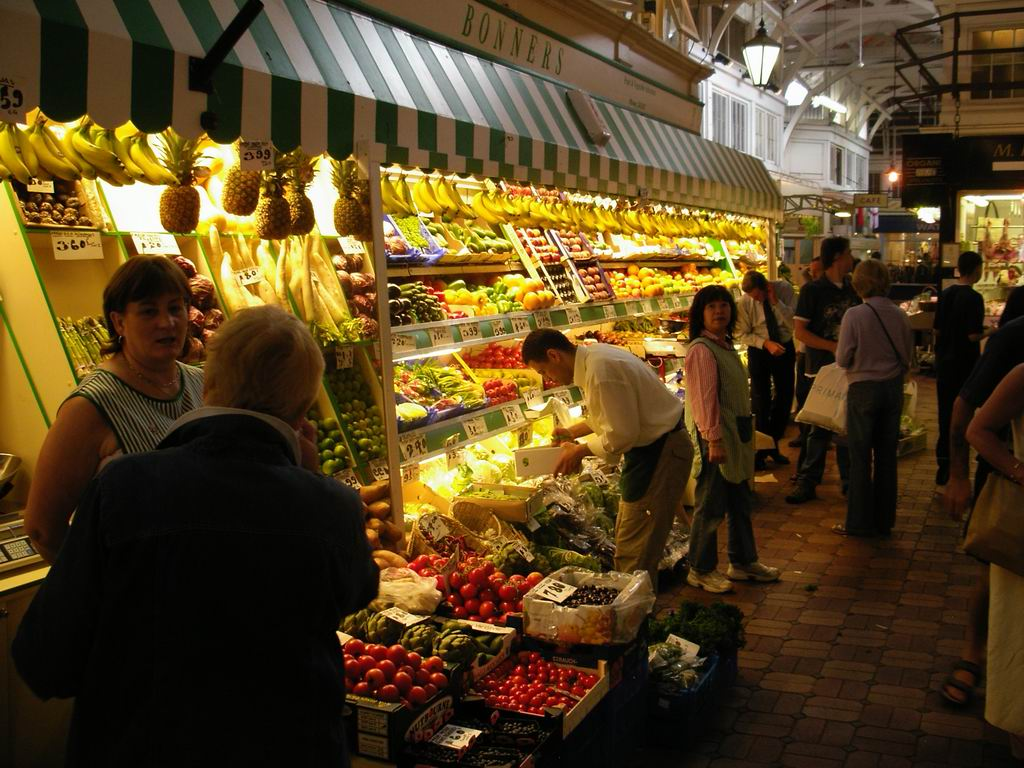
A fruit stand in the market

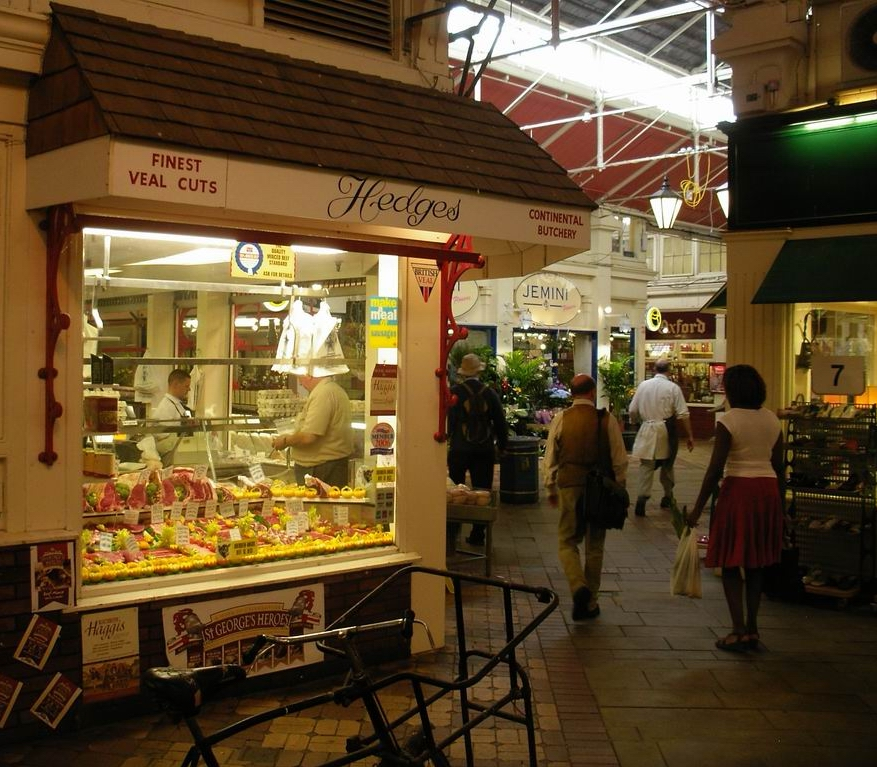
A butcher in the market

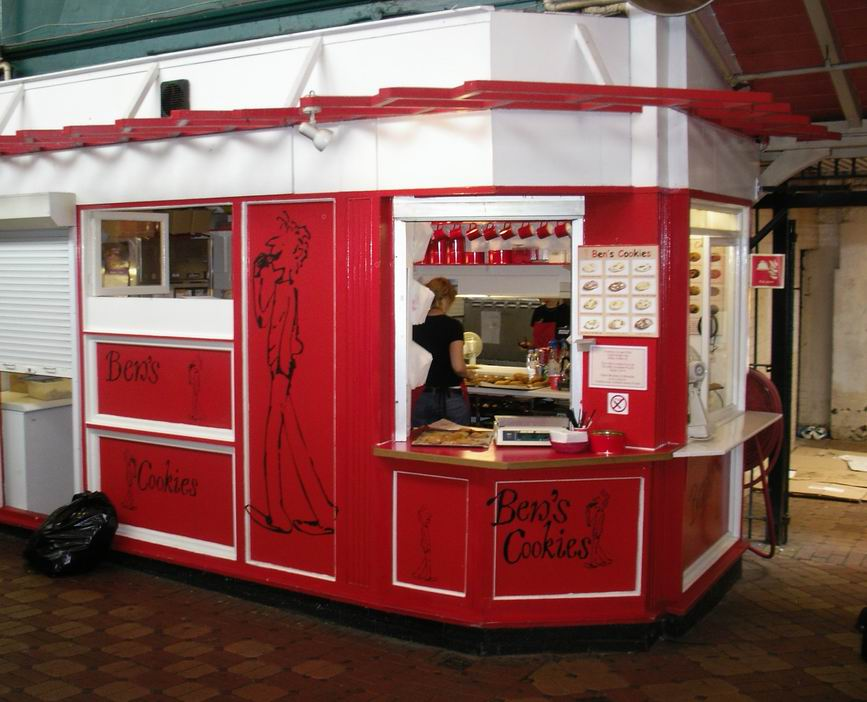
Ben's Cookies in the market
