= Horspath Halt railway station =

Former railway station in Oxfordshire, England

Coordinates: 51.7374°N 1.1730°W

Horspath Halt
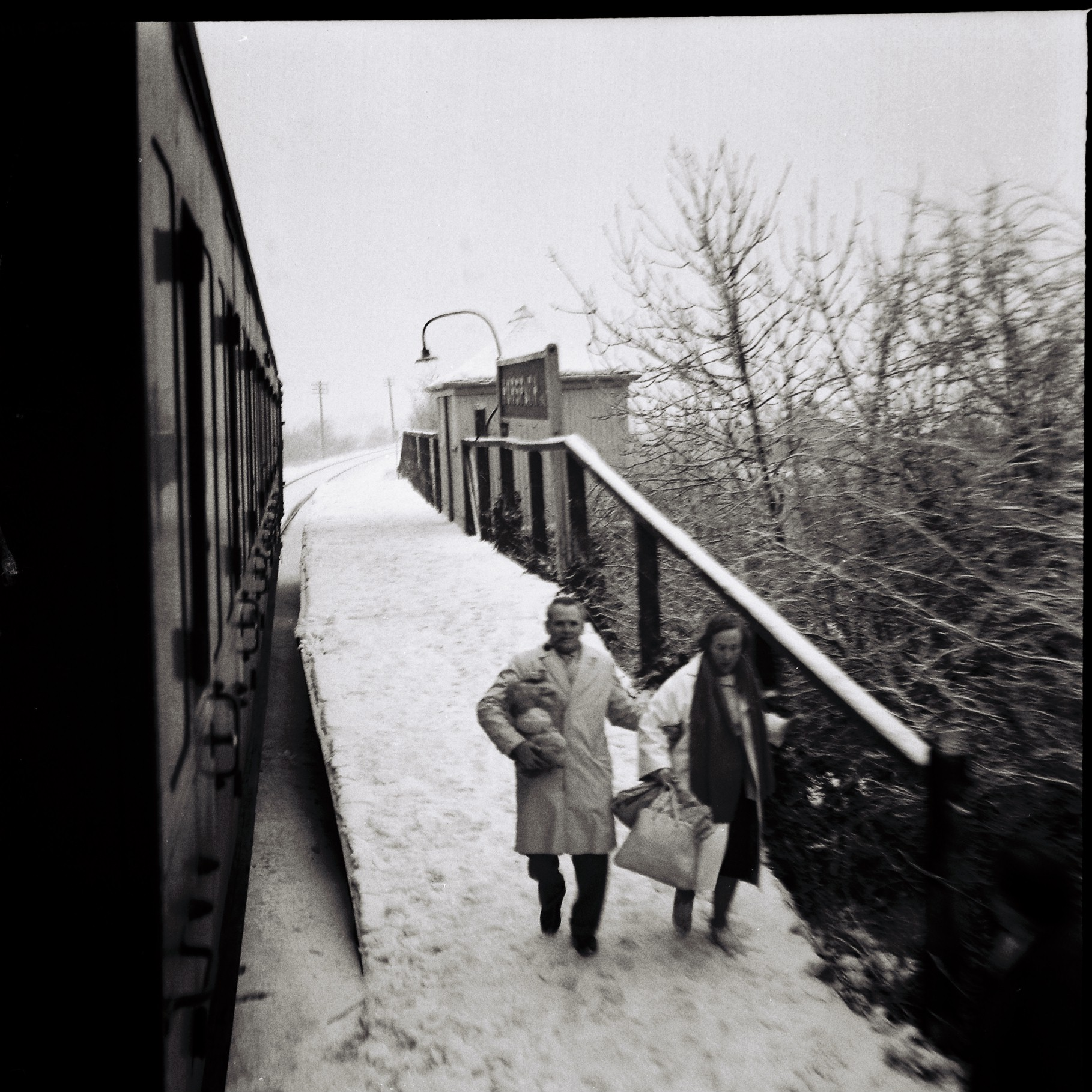

General information
- Location: Horspath, South Oxfordshire; England
- Grid reference: SP572046
- Platforms: 1

Other information
- Status: Disused

History
- Original company: Great Western Railway
- Pre-grouping: Great Western Railway
- Post-grouping: Great Western Railway; Western Region of British Railways

Key dates
- 1 February 1908: Opened
- 22 March 1915: Closed
- 5 June 1933: Reopened a short distance to the west
- 7 January 1963: Closed
- 1969: Track lifted
Location

Horspath Halt was an intermediate station on the Wycombe Railway which served the Oxfordshire village of Horspath from 1908 to 1915, and then from 1933 to 1963. The opening of the halt was part of an attempt by the Great Western Railway to encourage more passengers on the line at a time when competition from bus services was drawing away passengers. The possibility of reopening the line through Horspath Halt has been explored by Chiltern Railways, the franchise holder for the Chiltern Main Line which runs through Princes Risborough.

== History ==
On 24 October 1864, the Wycombe Railway opened an extension of its single track line to Thame to Kennington junction, just to the south of Oxford. Although the line ran through the village of Horspath, notably through a 524 yards (479 m) tunnel, it was to be a further 40 years before a station was opened here. In an attempt to stimulate Oxford suburban traffic, the Great Western Railway opened three motor halts on the line, one of which was to be situated to the south of Horspath Tunnel. The Board of Trade approved the opening of the halts in December 1907, and they opened to traffic in February 1908; the Board of Trade's Colonel Yorke later inspected the halts the following month. As with the other halts, Horspath had a single platform, 150 feet (46 m) long, with a 20 feet (6.1 m) by 70 feet (21 m) corrugated iron passenger shelter. In the event, the halt remained open only for seven years, closing in 1915 as a wartime economy measure.

The halt reopened in 1933 as part of another push by the GWR to attract passengers; it was situated 44 yards (40 m) to the west of the first site. As with Towersey Halt which opened on the same day, Horspath Halt had a 100 feet (30 m) long and 8 feet (2.4 m) wide wooden platform (costing £200) with a running in board which displayed the station's name on both sides. The halt was perched on an embankment, the corrugated iron passenger shelter being suspended off the bank with the aid of timbers to the rear of the platform into the embankment side. Responsibility for the unstaffed halt with its single oil lamp was given to the station master at Morris Cowley. Access to the halt was had via a sloping 1 in 10 fenced path leading up from the Cuddesdon Road where a wicket gate with a lamp was provided. It was to be initially served by 5 trains each way daily, and up to 500 passengers per month were expected.

During the Second World War, the local Home Guard cut slits through the corrugated iron shelter so that, in the event of invasion, it might serve as a sort of pillbox. On the basis of an estimated saving of £34,372, passenger services were withdrawn between Oxford and Princes Risborough from January 1963. The track between Thame and Morris Cowley was lifted in 1969, the allegedly deteriorating condition of Horspath Tunnel playing a large part in the decision.

Preceding station	Disused railways	Following station
Morris Cowley; Line closed, station closed	Great Western Railway; Wycombe Railway	Wheatley; Line closed, station closed

== Present day ==
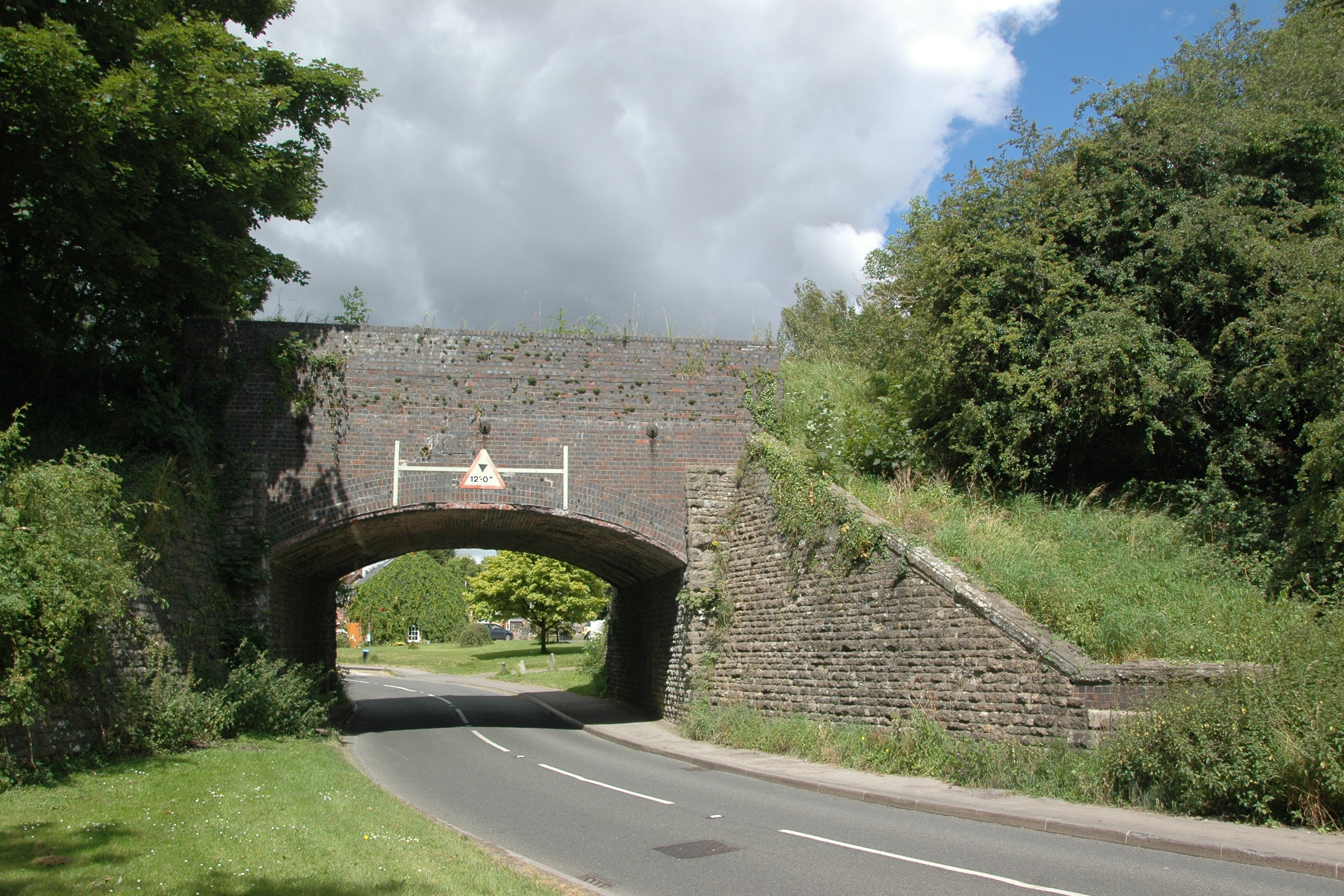
Horspath Halt was close to Cuddesdon Road bridge.

Nothing remains of the halt, but the track is in situ from a point about 500m west of the site of the halt. The line from here to Kennington Junction is used by car-carrying trains from the BMW Mini plant (see Morris Cowley railway station). The trackbed remains to the east as far as Wheatley where housing has been built on the site of the former station. A section of the trackbed was purchased in 1982 by Horspath Parish Council who manage the cutting as a nature reserve. The tunnel is owned by Oxfordshire County Council and was converted into a bat hibernaculum in 2002.

As part of its preparations for its bid to run the Chiltern Railways franchise, Chiltern Railways announced in 2000 that it was looking into the possibility of reinstating passenger services on the line between Oxford and Risborough, the cost of which it estimated at £250m. It was decided instead to build a 0.75 miles (1.21 km) link between the Oxford to Bicester Line and the Chiltern Main Line in order to run through services between Oxford and London via High Wycombe.

== Sources ==
- Butt, R. V. J. (October 1995). The Directory of Railway Stations: details every public and private passenger station, halt, platform and stopping place, past and present (1st ed.). Sparkford: Patrick Stephens Ltd. ISBN 978-1-85260-508-7. OCLC 60251199. OL 11956311M.
- Clinker, C.R. (October 1978). Clinker's Register of Closed Passenger Stations and Goods Depots in England, Scotland and Wales 1830-1977. Bristol: Avon-Anglia Publications & Services. ISBN 0-905466-19-5.
- Mitchell, Vic; Smith, Keith (April 2003). Branch Lines to Princes Risborough from Aylesbury, Oxford and Watlington. Midhurst, West Sussex: Middleton Press. ISBN 1-904474-05-5.
- Oppitz, Leslie (2000). Lost Railways of the Chilterns. Newbury: Countryside Books. ISBN 1-85306-643-5.
- Potts, C.R. (2004). Oxford to Princes Risborough: A GWR Secondary Route. Usk, Mon.: The Oakwood Press. ISBN 0-85361-629-9.
- Simpson, Bill (2001). A History of the Railways in Oxfordshire; Part 2: The South. Witney, Oxon: Lamplight Publications. ISBN 978-1-899246-06-9.
