= Albury, Oxfordshire =

Village in Oxfordshire, England

Coordinates: 51.741°N 1.053°W

Albury
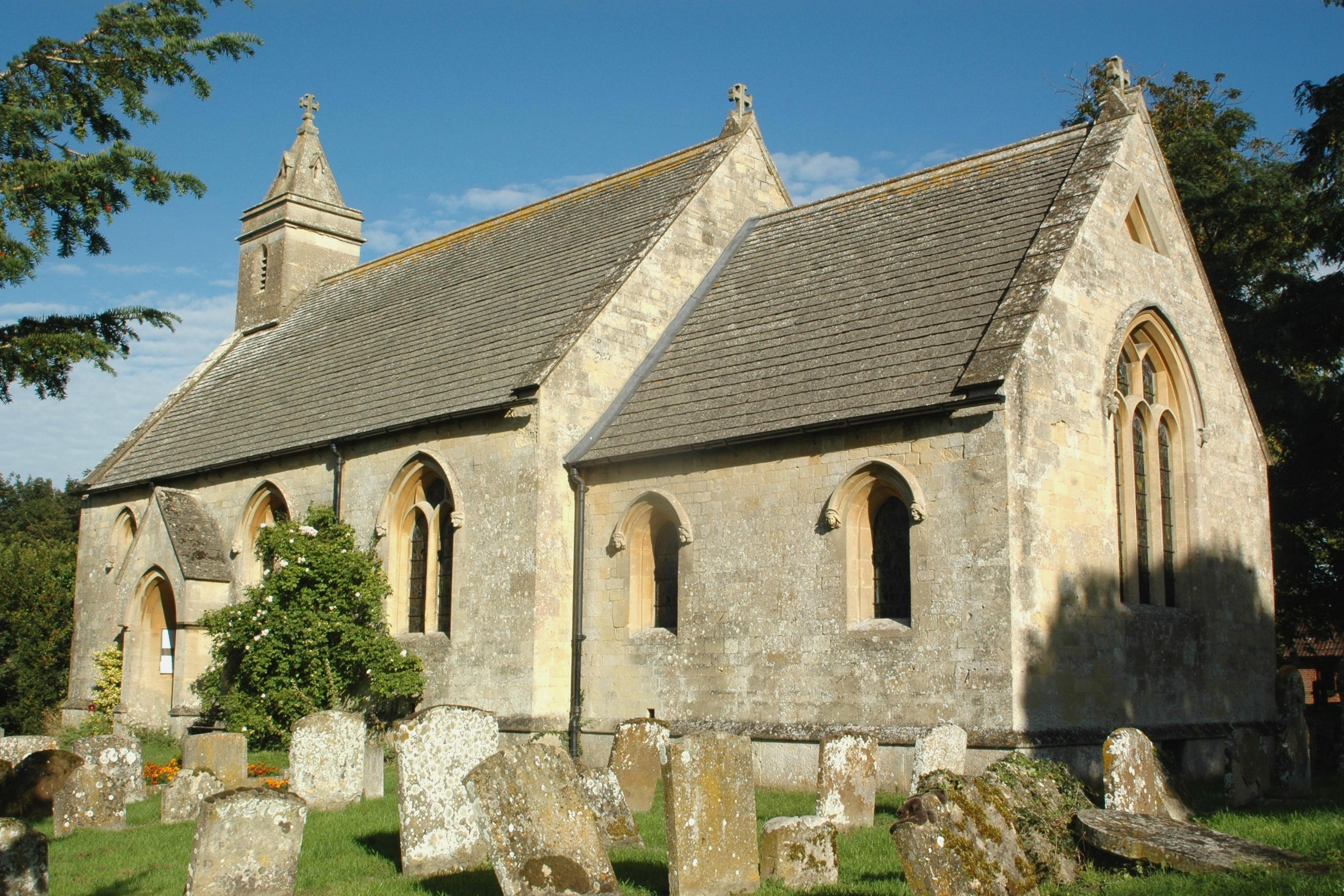
- St Helen's parish church from the south-east

- Location within Oxfordshire
- OS grid reference: SP6505
- Civil parish: Tiddington-with-Albury
- District: South Oxfordshire
- Shire county: Oxfordshire
- Region: South East
- Country: England
- Sovereign state: United Kingdom
- Post town: Thame
- Postcode district: OX9
- Dialling code: 01844
- Police: Thames Valley
- Fire: Oxfordshire
- Ambulance: South Central
- UK Parliament: Henley

Albury is a village in the civil parish of Tiddington-with-Albury, in the South Oxfordshire district, in Oxfordshire, England, about 5 miles (8 km) west of Thame.

In 1931 the parish had a population of 36. On 1 April 1932 the parish was abolished and merged with Tiddington to form "Tiddington with Albury".

== Manor ==
Its toponym is derived from the Old English Aldeberie, meaning "old fortified place", suggesting that the village's origins are Saxon.

After the Norman Conquest of England William the Conqueror granted the manor of Albury to William FitzOsbern, 1st Earl of Hereford. When the 1st Earl was killed in battle in Flanders in 1071 his estates in England and Wales passed to his son Roger de Breteuil, 2nd Earl of Hereford. In 1075 the 2nd Earl rebelled against William I, who suppressed the rebellion and confiscated the Earl's estates. It is not clear to whom the king granted Albury, or who held it until early in the 13th century when it belonged to William de Redvers, 5th Earl of Devon. It remained in his family until 1293, when his granddaughter Isabella de Fortibus, Countess of Devon died. Her estates were divided, and Albury passed to Warin de Lisle. It remained with de Lisle's heirs until 1368, when Robert de Lisle, 3rd Baron Lisle surrendered many manors including Albury to Richard II. Thereafter Albury had no feudal overlord.

== Parish church ==
Albury had a parish church by the beginning of the 13th century. It had a small nave and chancel, two Norman doorways and a 14th-century Decorated Gothic east window. The church's dedicatee was Saint Helen. In 1828 the church was demolished and in 1830 a new St. Helen's was completed, designed by the Gothic Revival architect Thomas Rickman. The only feature that Rickman retained from the old church was the 12th-century font. The architect A. Mardon Mowbray restored the building in 1891. By 1552 the old St. Helen's belfry had two bells. The new St. Helen's also has two, but these were cast in 1686 and the 18th century.

== Economic history ==
The parish was originally farmed in an open field system. Albury's common lands were enclosed in stages, and the process was complete by the 17th century. The Wycombe Railway extension from Thame to Oxford was completed and opened in 1864. A station was opened in the parish at Tiddington about 0.3 miles (480 m) west of Albury. British Railways closed the line and Tiddington railway station in 1963.

== Notable people ==
- Richard Wightwick, rector of Albury 1595–1607, later a co-founder of Pembroke College, Oxford

== Sources ==
- Lobel, Mary D, ed. (1957). A History of the County of Oxford: Volume 5: Bullingdon hundred. Victoria County History. pp. 8–14.
- Sherwood, Jennifer; Pevsner, Nikolaus (1974). Oxfordshire. The Buildings of England. Harmondsworth: Penguin Books. pp. 419–420. ISBN 0-14-071045-0.
