= Abingdon Road Halt railway station =

Former railway station in Oxfordshire, England

Abingdon Road Halt

General information
- Location: New Hinksey, City of Oxford; England
- Coordinates: 51.7300°N 1.2524°W
- Grid reference: SP517037
- Platforms: 2

Other information
- Status: Disused

History
- Original company: Great Western Railway
- Pre-grouping: Great Western Railway

Key dates
- 1 February 1908: Opened
- 22 March 1915: Closed
Location

Abingdon Road Halt railway station was built by the Great Western Railway to serve South Hinksey, a village near Oxford.

== History ==
The station was situated on the main Didcot to Oxford railway line, to the north of Kennington Junction, the junction for Thame and Princes Risborough. It was on the southern side of Abingdon Road, which crosses the railway here over a brick bridge known locally as the Red Bridge.

It was opened on 1 February 1908 along with four other halts on the route between Oxford and Wheatley.

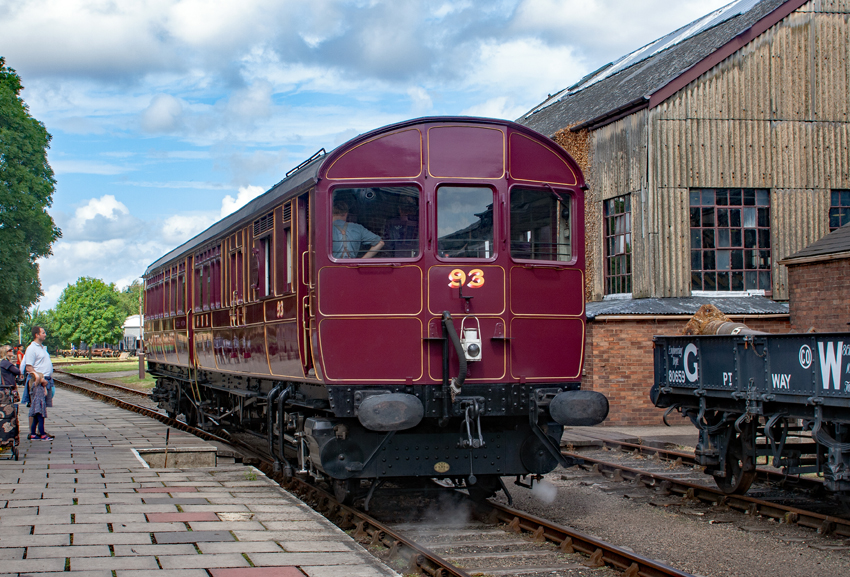
GWR steam railmotor No 93

Services were provided by steam railmotors based at Oxford, which was also the western terminus; the eastern terminus of these services was Wheatley, Thame or Princes Risborough. When the railmotor services were withdrawn on 22 March 1915, the halt closed. The line remains open for passenger services between Didcot Parkway and Oxford, but these do not call at Abingdon Road Halt. The line was quadrupled during 1942, and little, if any, trace remains.

== Route ==
Preceding station	Disused railways	Following station
Hinksey Halt; Line open, station closed	Great Western Railway; 1908-1915	Iffley Halt; Line open, station closed
