= Iffley Halt railway station =

Former railway station in Oxfordshire, England

Iffley Halt

General information
- Location: Kennington, Vale of White Horse; England
- Coordinates: 51.7213°N 1.2432°W
- Grid reference: SP523028
- Platforms: 1

Other information
- Status: Disused

History
- Original company: Great Western Railway
- Pre-grouping: Great Western Railway

Key dates
- 1 February 1908: Opened
- 22 March 1915: Closed
Location

Iffley Halt railway station was built by the Great Western Railway to serve Iffley, a suburb of Oxford; it was actually in Kennington, and not in Iffley.

The station was situated at the western end of Kennington Railway Bridge, which crosses the River Thames. Access from Iffley was via the River Thames towpath, which has a footbridge over Hinksey Stream close to this point. It was opened on 1 February 1908 along with four other halts on the former Wycombe Railway route between Oxford and Wheatley.

Services were provided by steam railmotors based at Oxford, which was also the western terminus; the eastern terminus of these services was Wheatley, Thame or Princes Risborough. When the railmotor services were withdrawn on 22 March 1915, the halt closed. The line remained open for through passenger services, but these did not call at Iffley Halt.

== Route ==
Preceding station	Disused railways	Following station
Abingdon Road Halt	Great Western Railway; Wycombe Railway; 1908-1915	Littlemore
