= Hinksey Halt railway station =

Former railway station in Oxfordshire, England

Hinksey Halt

General information
- Location: New Hinksey, City of Oxford; England
- Coordinates: 51.7368°N 1.2573°W
- Grid reference: SP513044
- Platforms: 2

Other information
- Status: Disused

History
- Opened: 1 February 1908
- Closed: 22 March 1915
- Original company: Great Western Railway
- Pre-grouping: Great Western Railway
Location

Hinksey Halt railway station was built by the Great Western Railway to serve New Hinksey, a suburb of Oxford.

== History ==
The station was situated on the Didcot to Oxford Cherwell Valley line, to the north of the site of Millstream Junction, the junction for the original terminus at Oxford (Grandpont), which was later a goods station but had closed by 1900. Access to Hinksey Halt was via Norreys Avenue and a footpath across the adjacent reservoir. The reservoir was formerly a ballast pit, dug by the GWR between 1844 and 1848.

It was opened on 1 February 1908 along with four other halts on the route between Oxford and Wheatley.

Services were provided by steam railmotors based at Oxford, which was also the western terminus; the eastern terminus of these services was Wheatley, Thame or Princes Risborough. When the railmotor services were withdrawn on 22 March 1915, the halt closed. The line remains open for passenger services between Reading and Oxford, but these do not call at Hinksey Halt.

== Route ==
Preceding station	Disused railways	Following station
Oxford; Line and station open	Great Western Railway; 1908-1915	Abingdon Road Halt; Line open, station closed
