= List of windmills in Oxfordshire =

Extant windmills in Oxfordshire.
1 Blackthorn, 2 Bloxham Grove, 3 Chinnor, 4 Great Haseley, 5 North Leigh, 6 Wardington, 7 Wheatley

This is a list of windmills in the ceremonial county of Oxfordshire, England.

== Locations ==
Location	Name of mill and grid reference	Type	Maps	First mention or built	Last mention or demise	Photograph
Adderbury	SP 495 343		1675; 1715	1675	1715	
Adderbury			1675	1675	1675	
Alkerton			1715	1715	1715	
Arncott	Arncott Mill; SP 614 172	Post		1849	Collapsed 1950; Windmill World	
Banbury	Easington; SP 457 398	Post	1675; 1715	1675	Demolished early 18th century	
Banbury	Broughton Road; SP 441 391	Post	1675	1675	Demolished 1823	
Banbury	Berry Moor Mill; SP 441 391			c. 1820	1832	
Beckley	Lord's Mill; Approximately; SP 566 106			13th century	17th century	
Bicester				1285	1285	
Bicester	Buckingham Road; SP 584 236		1675	1675	1675	
Bicester	Middleton Road; SP 565 225		1675	1675	Blown down 1881	
Blackthorn	West Mill; SP 612 205	Tower			Standing in 1943, later truncated Windmill World	
Blackthorn	East Mill; SP 612 205	Tower		18th century	Windmill World	
Bloxham			1715	1715	1715	
Bloxham	Bloxham Grove Mill; SP 456 367	Post		1865	Windmill World	
Charlton on Otmoor	SP 567 164	Post		1610	1905	
Cropredy				1719	Moved to Avon Dassett, Warwickshire 1725	
Chinnor	Wain Hill			1249	1249	
Chinnor	Chinnor Mill; SP 750 010	Post		1789	Dismantled 1965	
Chinnor	Chinnor Mill; SP 749 010	Post		2009	Windmill World	
Chipping Norton	Chipping Norton Mill; SP 318 272	Post		19th Century	19th Century	
Clanfield	Clanfield Mill; SP 283 019	Tower			Standing in 1900	
Deddington	Deddington Mill; SP 456 318		1823	1615	1823	
Epwell	Epwell Mill; SP 350 408	Tower	1675	1675	1912	
Faringdon	Faringdon Mill; SU 293 955	Tower		1876	1876	
Garsington				1308	1308	
Goring	By the weir			1538	1538	
Great Hasely	Milton Common Mill; SP 638 026	Tower		1760	Windmill World	
Great Milton	Great Milton Mill; SP 617 030	Post	1820	1820	Demolished 1910	
Headington	SP 549 065			1303	1303	
Headington	Eastern mill of the pair SP 549 065	Tower	1823	18th century		
Headington	Western mill of the pair SP 557 076	Post	1823	1771	1823	
Henley-on-Thames	Mill Hill Mill; SU 755 810		1715	1715	1715	
Holton	Approximately; SP 610 058		1794	1794	1794	
Hook Norton	SP 365 356					
Hornton	SP 389 449	Tower		1787	Standing in 1933	
Ledwell	SP 411 285		1675^{*} 1715	1675	1715, gone by 1793	
Lewknor	Postcombe Mill			16th century	17th century	
Lewknor	Windmill Knapp		16th century	17th century		
Little Milton	Little Milton Mill; SP 618 020	Tower			Demolished 1910	
Little Rollright	Little Rollright Mill; Approximately; SP 291 304	Post			Gone by 1705	
Little Rollright	Little Rollright Mill; Approximately; SP 291 304	Post		1705		
Lower Assendon		Titt iron wind engine			Standing in 1977	
Milcombe	Milcombe Mill; SP 410 338	Post				
Mollington	Mollington Mill; SP 444 474			1545	1797	
Nettlebed	Nettlebed Mill; SU 702 873		1675	1675	1675	
Nettlebed	Nettlebed Mill; SU 702 873	Smock		1825	Burnt down 1912	
North Leigh	North Leigh Mill; SP 3865 1292	Tower		18th century	Windmill World	
Osney	Osney Abbey			c. 1189		
Oxford	Holywell Mill	Post		1660	1660	
Salford	SP 292 276		1794	1794	Demolished 1878	
Sibford Gower				17th century	17th century	
South Newington			1715	1715	1715	
South Weston	South Weston Mill; SU 703 990	Smock		1676	Demolished in 1919	
Stanton St John	Stanton St Joh Mill; Approximately; SP 568 085		1766	1766	1766	
Stokenchurch	Stokenchurch Mill; SU 751 966		1675	1675	1675	
Stokenchurch	Stokenchurch Mill; SU 751 966	Post		1736	Collapsed 1926	
Stoke Row	Stoke Row Mill; SU 685 840			1821	1838	
Stonesfield	Stonesfield Mill; SP 391 170	Tower			Standing in 1900	
Studley			1339	1339		
Studley			1823	1823	1823	
Sydenham	Sydenham Mill; Approximately; SP 735 035		1715; 1794	1715	1794, moved to Stone, Buckinghamshire in 1801	
Thame	Thame Mill; SP 705053			1594	1594	
Thame		Tower	Early 17th century	1797		
		Tower		1797	1880	
Towersey	Towersey Mill; SP 733 062					
Wardington	Wardington Mill; SP 488 476	Tower	1715	1715	Windmill World	
Waterstock	Waterstock Mill; SP635 055		1676; 1715	1676	1715	
Watlington	Watlington Mill; SU 073 952	Smock			Moved to Nettlebed 1825	
Wheatley		Post			Blown down 1767	
Wheatley		Post	1675; 1715; 1823	1673	Burnt down c. 1876	
Wheatley	Wheatley Windmill, Wheatley, Oxfordshire; SP 589 053	Tower	1823	1784	Windmill World; Wheatley Windmill Restoration Society	
Wykham			1675	1653	1688, gone by 1746	

== Maps ==
- 1675 Ogilby
- 1675^{*} Plott
- 1676 Ogilby
- 1715 Overton
- 1766 Jeffrey
- 1794 Richard Davis
- 1820 Townsend
- 1823 Bryant

== Notes ==
Mills in bold are still standing, known building dates are indicated in bold. Text in italics denotes indicates that the information is not confirmed, but is likely to be the case stated.

== Sources ==
Unless otherwise indicated, the source for all entries is Foreman, Wilfred (1983). Oxfordshire Mills. Chichester: Phillimore. ISBN 0-85033-441-1.
