= Tiddington =

Tiddington may refer to two places in England:

- Tiddington, Oxfordshire
- Tiddington, Warwickshire
