= Littlemore railway station =

Former railway station in Oxfordshire, England

Littlemore
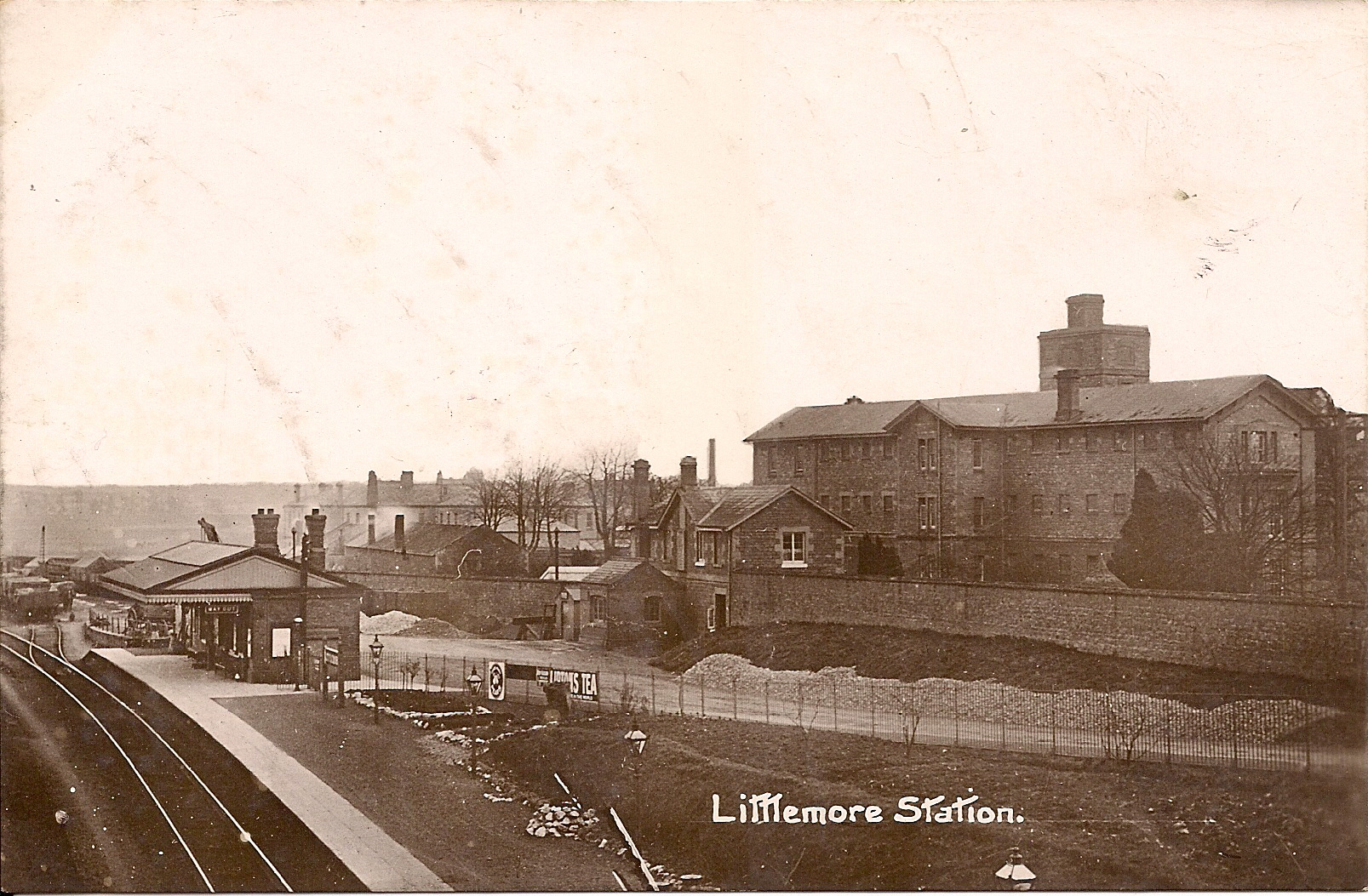

General information
- Location: Littlemore, City of Oxford; England
- Coordinates: 51.71856°N 1.22481°W
- Grid reference: SP536024
- Platforms: 1

Other information
- Status: Disused

History
- Original company: Wycombe Railway
- Pre-grouping: Great Western Railway
- Post-grouping: Great Western Railway

Key dates
- 1864: Opened
- 1963: Closed
Location

Littlemore railway station was on the Wycombe Railway and served Littlemore in Oxfordshire. Littlemore was then a village but is now a suburb of Oxford.

The Wycombe Railway opened the station in 1864 as part of its extension from Thame to Oxford.

In 1963 British Railways withdrew passenger services between Princes Risborough and Oxford and closed all intermediate stations including Littlemore. The line through Littlemore remains open for freight traffic between the Didcot - Oxford main line at Kennington Junction and the BMW Mini factory at Cowley.

In November 2014 Chiltern Railways ran a train filled with investors and local businessmen along the track to a temporary station at Oxford Science Park, signalling the possibility of a station in Littlemore by 2020.

== Route ==
Preceding station	Disused railways	Following station
Iffley Halt	Great Western Railway; Wycombe Railway	Morris Cowley
