= National Cycle Route 57 =

Cycle route in the United Kingdom

Coordinates: 51.7345°N 0.9180°W

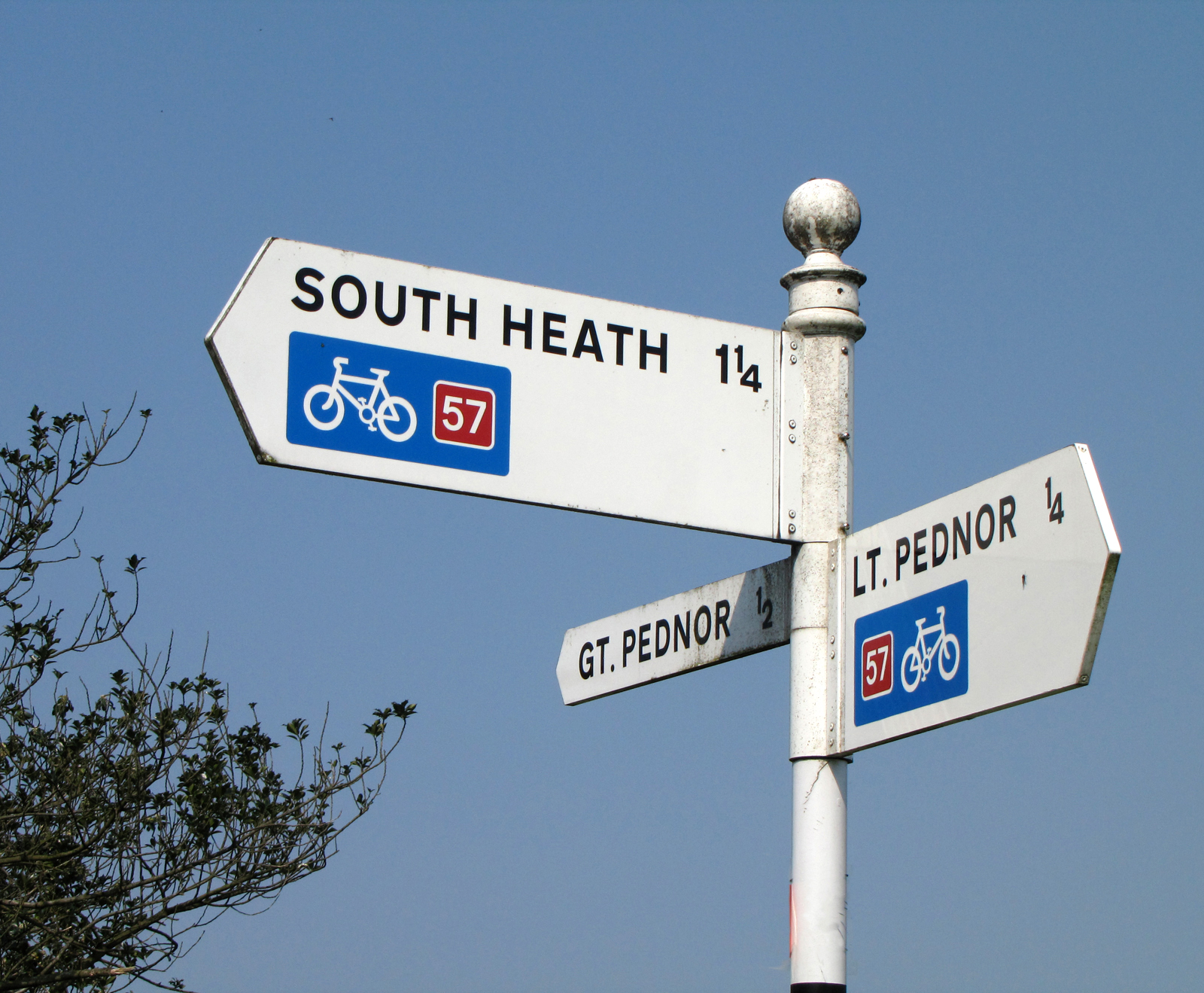
NCN Route 57 sign near Pednor

National Cycle Route 57 is part of the United Kingdom's National Cycle Network. When complete, it will run west to east from Farmington, Gloucestershire near Northleach to Welwyn Garden City in Hertfordshire.

Several sections are not suitable for road bikes.

Links to:

- National Cycle Route 5 at Oxford.
- National Cycle Route 6 at Harpenden.
- National Cycle Route 12 at Welwyn Garden City.

== Route ==
=== Farmington to Oxford ===
Farmington | Burford | Witney | Eynsham | Oxford

National Route 57 starts in the small village of Farmington, near Northleach. Here it meets NCR 48, which runs south to Northleach and Cirencester; the northern continuation to Bourton-on-the-Water and Stow-on-the-Wold is not yet open.

NCR 57 continues on lightly trafficked lanes along the valley of the River Windrush to Burford and Witney; this section was formerly Regional Route 47.

The route is not yet open between Witney and Oxford. Possible route options include Eynsham and a new cycle path along the B4044 to Botley, or across the Thames via a new bridge or ferry at Bablock Hythe.

=== Oxford to Thame ===
Oxford | Horspath | Littleworth | Wheatley | Waterperry | Worminghall | Shabbington | Thame

This section is largely on country lanes and is fully signposted.

This route flows from the centre of Oxford along the High Street and Cowley Road then away from traffic along paths through Marsh Park. Once out of the park there is a steep climb up Barracks Lane, which then follows a flat mainly traffic free route to Horspath passing BMW Mini site and Oxford City Athletics Club.

The route from Horspath through to Wheatley is along country roads so too is the section from Wheatley to just before Thame, which then becomes a cycle path into Thame before joining the old railway line Phoenix Trail.

=== Thame to Princes Risborough ===
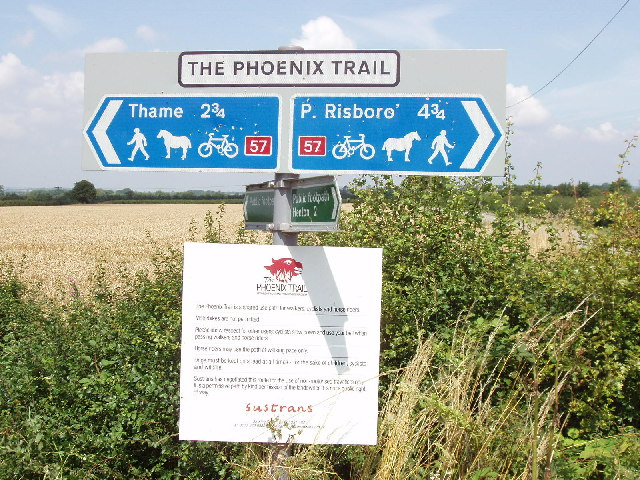
Phoenix Trail

Thame | Horsenden | Princes Risborough

7 miles (11 km) in length, this section follows the Phoenix Trail along the route of a disused railway. The surface is a mixture of tarmac and compacted grit.

=== Princes Risborough to Chesham ===
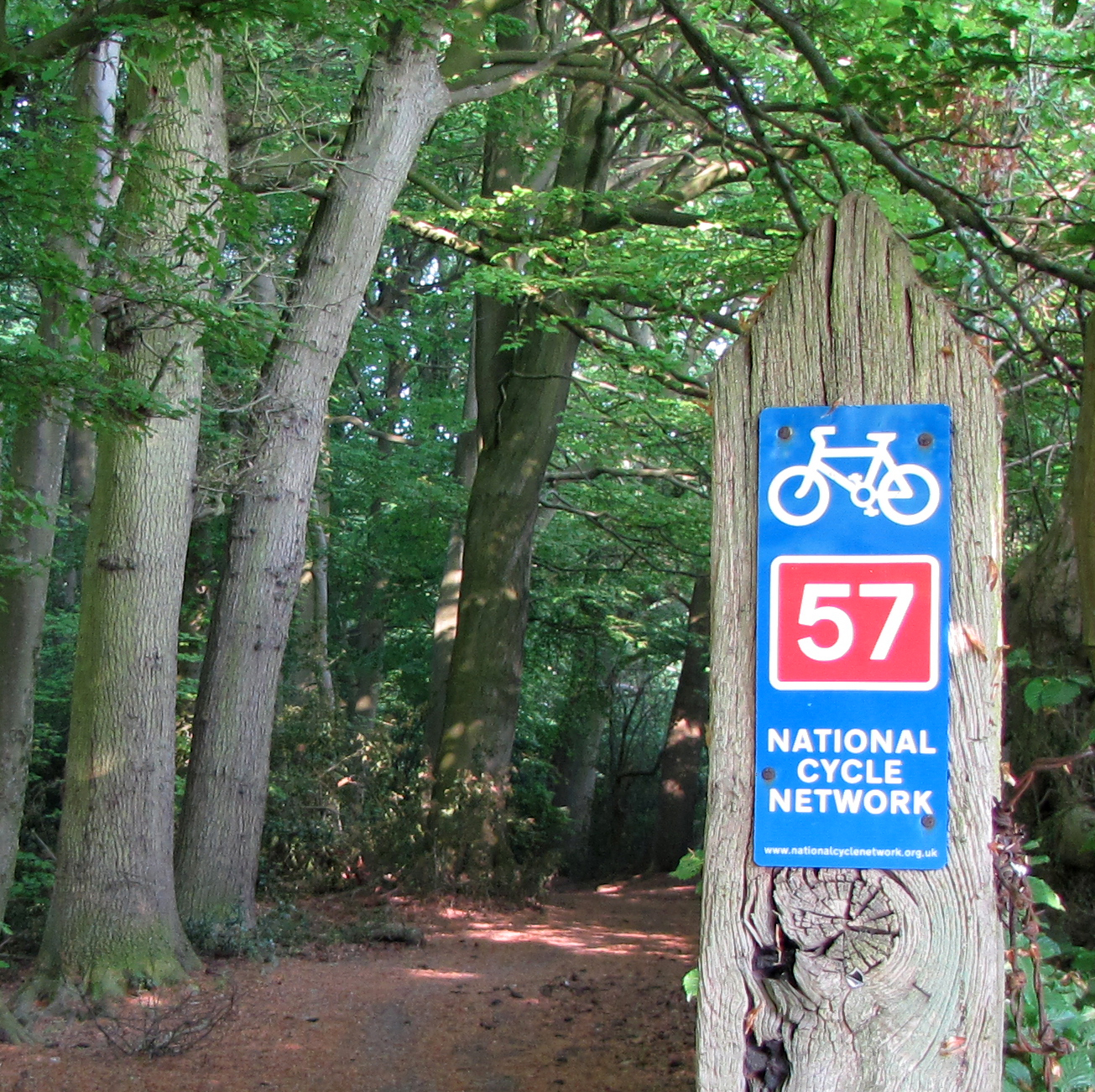
NCN Route 57 near Great Missenden

Princes Risborough | Great Hampden | Prestwood | Great Missenden | South Heath | Chesham

This section leaves the relatively flat Oxfordshire countryside and continues on into the Chiltern Hills. Leaving Princes Risborough the route climbs up Kop Hill to the top of Whiteleaf Cross. From there it continues along small lanes to Prestwood. The short section between Prestwood and Great Missenden takes you off-road along a compacted grit path.

=== Chesham to Hemel Hempstead ===
Chesham | Hemel Hempstead

This section has never been created.

=== Hemel Hempstead to Welwyn Garden City ===
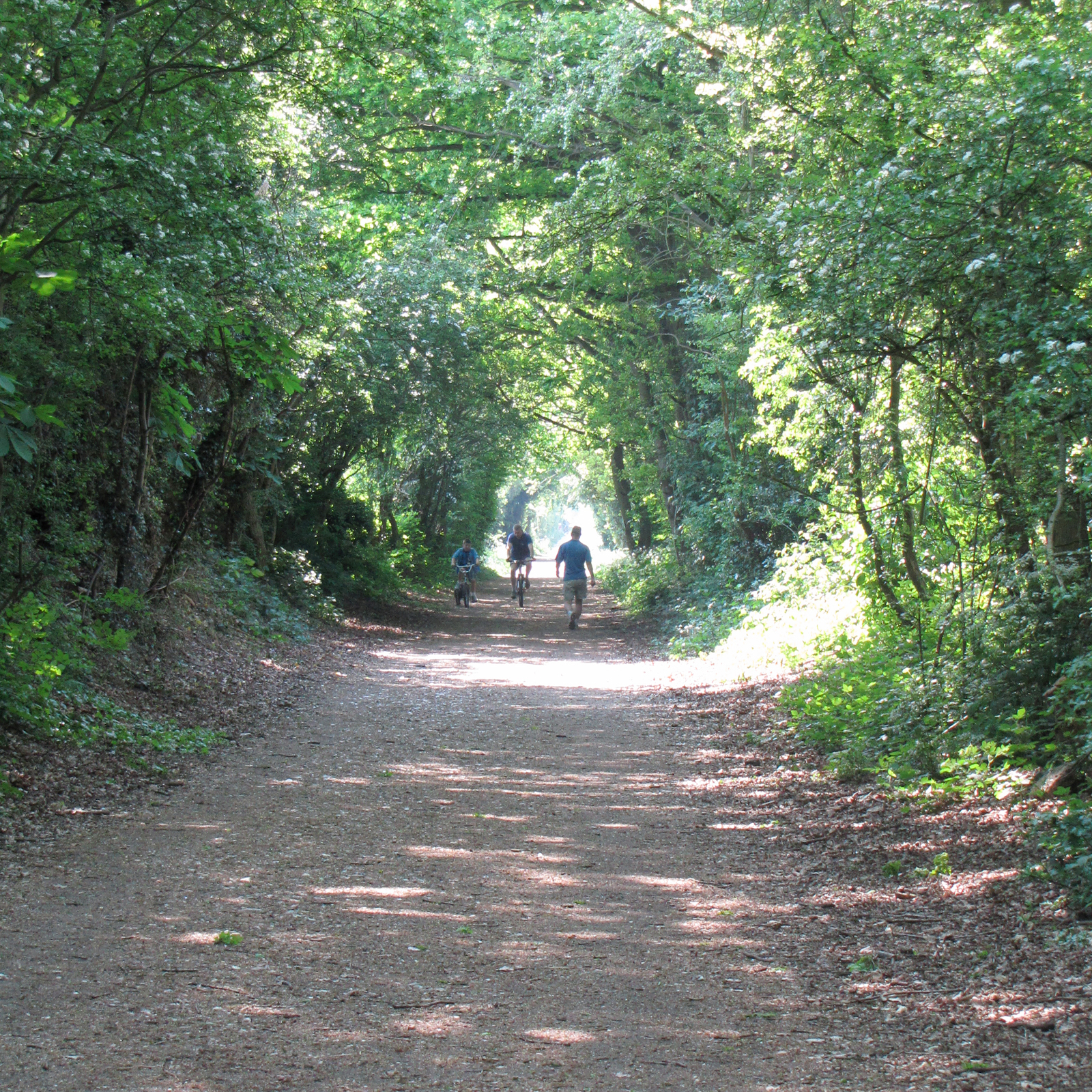
NCN Route 57 following the route of the Nickey Line near Harpenden

Hemel Hempstead | Redbourn | Harpenden | Wheathampstead | Welwyn Garden City

Much of this section is traffic free as it follows the Nickey Line between Hemel Hempstead and Harpenden.

However, between Harpenden and Wheathampstead there is no route owing to land ownership issues. The alternatives are either a steep climb up to the busy minor road on the ridge to the south or to follow the very busy Lower Luton Road (B653). Neither is particularly easy if riding with children.

At Wheathampstead there is then continuous off-road path to Welwyn Garden City and then a signed on road route via the town centre to the junction at Twentieth Mile Bridge with route 12. The section between Wheathampstead and Welwyn is also known as the Ayot Greenway and follows the trackbed of the former railway line between Dunstable and Hatfield.

== See also ==
- National Cycle Network
- Phoenix Trail
- Nickey Line
- Sustrans
