= Littleworth, Oxfordshire =

Littleworth is the name of two places in Oxfordshire:

- Littleworth, South Oxfordshire is a hamlet near Wheatley
- Littleworth, Vale of White Horse is a village near Faringdon
