= Tiddington railway station =

Former railway station in Oxfordshire, England

Tiddington
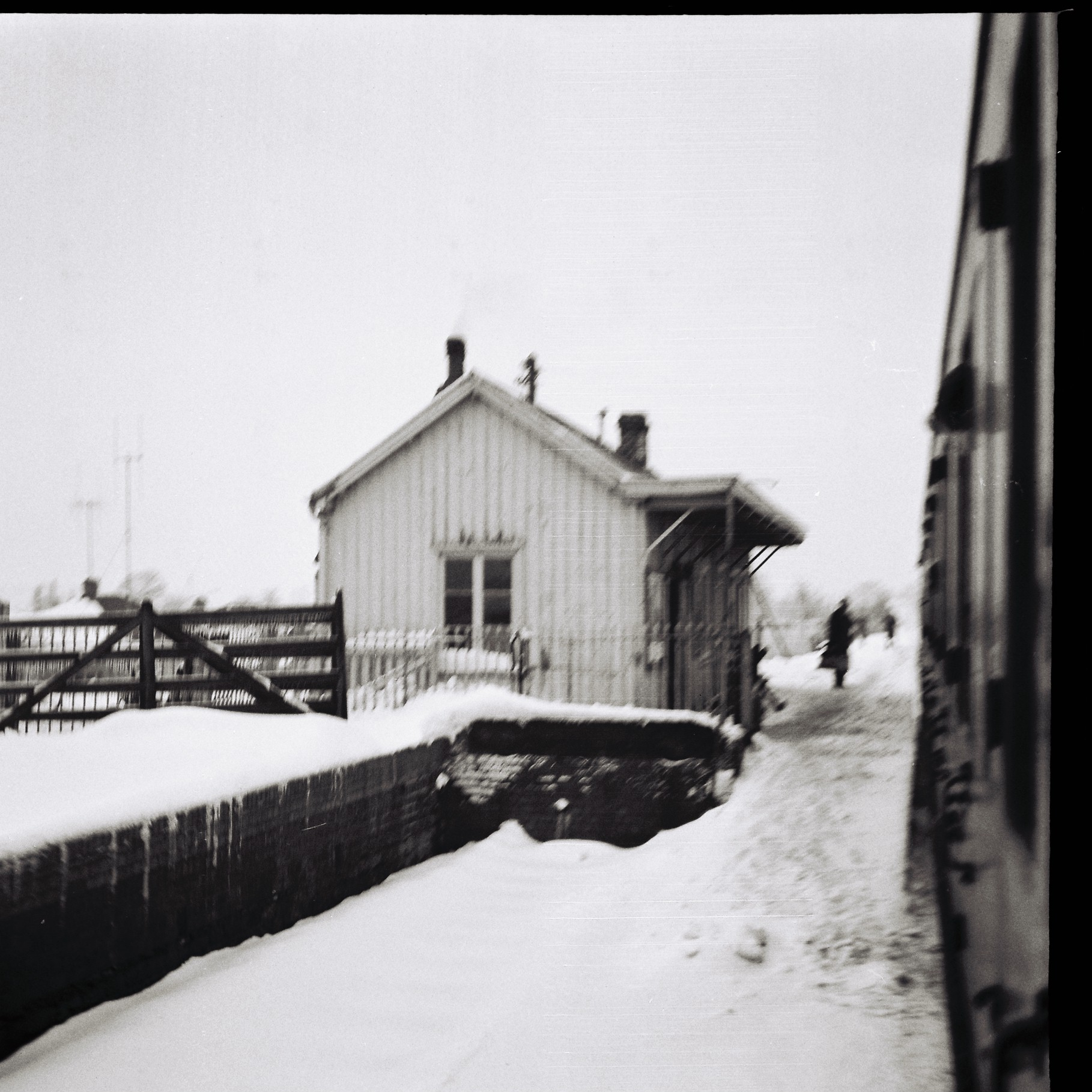

General information
- Location: Tiddington, South Oxfordshire; England
- Coordinates: 51.7401°N 1.0638°W
- Grid reference: SP647049
- Platforms: 1

Other information
- Status: Disused

History
- Original company: Wycombe Railway
- Pre-grouping: Great Western Railway
- Post-grouping: Great Western Railway

Key dates
- 1866: Station opened
- 7 January 1963: Station closed
Location

Tiddington railway station was on the Wycombe Railway and served the village of Tiddington, Oxfordshire.

On 24 October 1864 the Wycombe Railway opened an extension from Thame to Oxford. The line passed just south of Tiddington, although Tiddington was not provided at first with a station, the station being opened and appearing on timetables for the first time on 1 June 1866. The station building being constructed in timber with a small canopy over part of the platform. A signal box was provided in 1892 but was downgraded to a ground frame by 1907.

On 7 January 1963 British Railways withdrew passenger services between Princes Risborough and Oxford, closed all intermediate stations including Tiddington, and dismantled the track between Thame and Morris Cowley.

| Preceding station | Disused railways | Following station |
|---|---|---|
| Wheatley; Line and station closed | Western Region of British Railways; Wycombe Railway | Thame; Line and station closed |
