= Tiddington-with-Albury =

Civil parish in Oxfordshire, England

Coordinates: 51.741°N 1.057°W

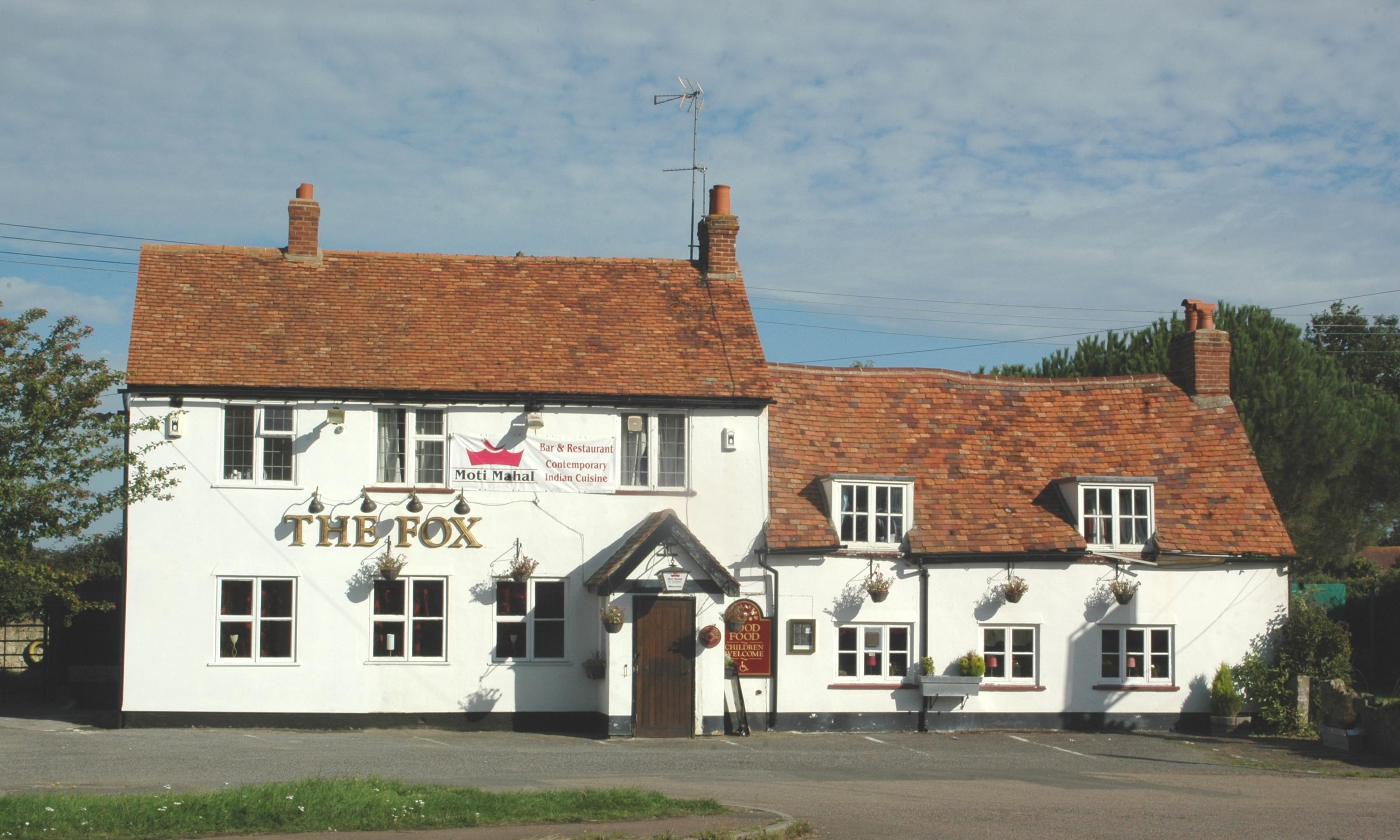
- The Fox, Riddington

- Location within Oxfordshire
- Area: 4.4 km^{2} (1.7 sq mi)
- Population: 660 (2011 census)
  - Density: 150/km^{2} (390/sq mi)
- Civil parish: Tiddington-with-Albury
- District: South Oxfordshire
- Shire county: Oxfordshire
- Region: South East
- Country: England
- Sovereign state: United Kingdom
- UK Parliament: Henley and Thame

Tiddington-with-Albury is a civil parish in the South Oxfordshire district, in the county of Oxfordshire. It includes the village of Albury (Ordnance Survey grid reference SP655051), the larger village of Tiddington (OS Grid ref. SP649051) and the hamlet of Draycot (Ordnance Survey grid reference SP6460). It was formed by a merger of the civil parishes of Albury and Tiddington in 1932 and in 2011 had a population of 660 across an area of 4.4 km².

== Sources ==
- Lobel, Mary D. (1957). Victoria County History: A History of the County of Oxford: Volume 5: Bullingdon Hundred. pp. 8–9.
