= Towersey =

Village in Oxfordshire, England

Coordinates: 51.741°N 0.937°W

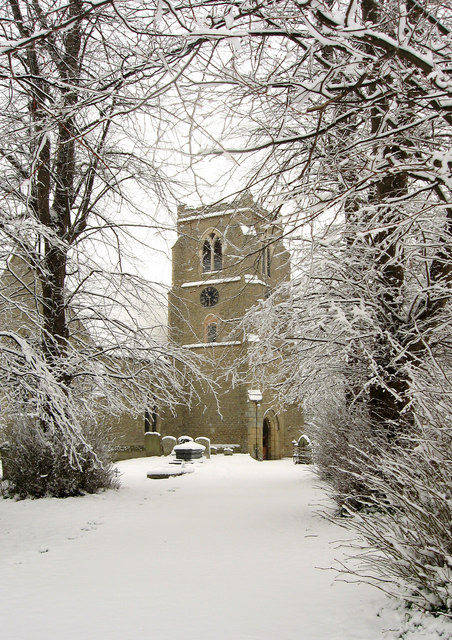
- St Catherine's parish church

- Location within Oxfordshire
- Area: 5.57 km^{2} (2.15 sq mi)
- Population: 433 (2011 Census)
  - Density: 78/km^{2} (200/sq mi)
- OS grid reference: SP7305
- Civil parish: Towersey
- District: South Oxfordshire
- Shire county: Oxfordshire
- Region: South East
- Country: England
- Sovereign state: United Kingdom
- Post town: Thame
- Postcode district: OX9
- Dialling code: 01844
- Police: Thames Valley
- Fire: Oxfordshire
- Ambulance: South Central
- UK Parliament: Henley and Thame
- Website: Towersey Village

Towersey is a village and civil parish about 1 1/2 miles (2.4 km) east of Thame in Oxfordshire. Towersey was part of Buckinghamshire until 1933, when the county boundary was moved and Towersey was exchanged for Kingsey. The 2011 Census recorded Towersey parish's population as 433.

== Toponym ==
The toponym "Towersey" is derived from Old and Middle English. The Domesday Book of 1086 records it as simply Eia, meaning "island". This refers to a dry area of land in the marshes of the Aylesbury Vale, on the edge of which the village stands. A manuscript of 1174 records Kingsey also as simply Eya, but thereafter both toponyms gained prefixes to distinguish the two villages. A manuscript of 1194 refers to Kingseie, which has evolved into "Kingsey". Mid-13th-century records refer to Turrisey and Tureseye, which has evolved into "Towersey". It means "island of de Turs", referring to Richard de Turs, who held the manor from 1252.

== Parish church ==
The earliest part of the Church of England parish church of Saint Catherine is its 13th-century Early English Gothic chancel. The nave was rebuilt early in the 14th century and is Decorated Gothic. In 1850–54 the church was restored under the direction of the architect James Cranston, who added the bell tower in its slightly unusual position on the south side of the nave. The tower has a ring of four bells. Ellis I Knight of Reading, Berkshire cast the second, third and tenor bells in 1627. Richard Keene of Woodstock cast the treble bell in 1695. St Catherine's also has a Sanctus bell that Keene cast in 1699. St Catherine's is now one of eight parishes in the Benefice of Thame.

== Railway ==
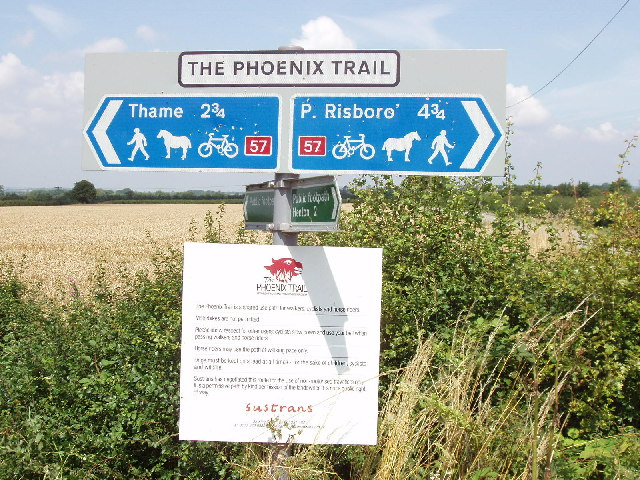
Phoenix Trail signpost in Towersey

In 1859 the Wycombe Railway began to be extended through Towersey parish from High Wycombe to Thame. crossing Chinnor Road on a bridge just south of the village. The line opened in 1862.

In 1864 the line was extended again from Thame to Oxford. Thame was the nearest station until 1933, when the Great Western Railway opened Towersey Halt on the west side of the bridge. British Railways withdrew passenger services in January 1963 and freight services to Thame in 1991. The track has since been lifted. The former railway bridge with its steel span over Chinnor Road survives. The trackbed has been converted into the Phoenix Trail for cycling, horseriding and walking between Princes Risborough and Thame.

== Amenities ==
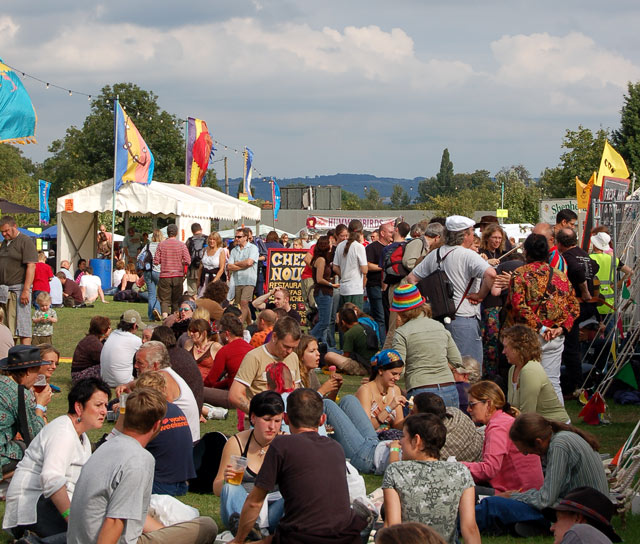
Part of Towersey Festival in 2006

Towersey has a public house, the Three Horseshoes. The village is the setting for the Towersey Village Festival which is a festival of folk music and dance. It was founded in 1965 and is held annually on August bank holiday weekend. Its foundation was followed by the foundation in 1966 of a Cotswold Morris side, Towersey Morris, which still performs today.

== Notable people ==
- In 1933 artist Stanley Anderson bought a cottage ("Old Timbers") in Towersey and began producing the engravings of country crafts for which he is best known.
- Broadcaster Ken Bruce lives in Towersey.
- Kenneth St George Cartwright, an expert on timber mycology, raised from seed many rare species of plants in his garden.
- Denis Manners, folk music enthusiast, was one of the organisers of the original Towersey Festival of folk music and dancing in 1965. He died in 2009.
- Composer and conductor Vilém Tauský and his wife Margaret (Peggy) lived for many years (from the early 1950s) at Rose Cottage, Chinnor Road.

== Sources and further reading ==
- Ekwall, Eilert (1940) [1936]. Concise Oxford Dictionary of English Place-Names (2nd ed.). Oxford: Oxford University Press. pp. 164, 456.
- Oppitz, Leslie (2000). Lost Railways of the Chilterns. Newbury: Countryside Books. pp. 16–19. ISBN 1-85306-643-5.
- Page, W.H., ed. (1927). A History of the County of Buckingham. Victoria County History. Vol. 4. London: The St Katherine Press. pp. 105–107.
- RCHME, ed. (1912). An Inventory of the Historical Monuments in Buckinghamshire. Vol. 1, South. London: Her Majesty's Stationery Office. pp. 294–297.
- Sherwood, Jennifer; Pevsner, Nikolaus (1974). Oxfordshire. The Buildings of England. Harmondsworth: Penguin Books. pp. 819–820. ISBN 0-14-071045-0.
