= Wheatley Windmill, Wheatley, Oxfordshire =

Windmill in Wheatley, Oxfordshire, England

Coordinates: 51.74274°N 1.14875°W

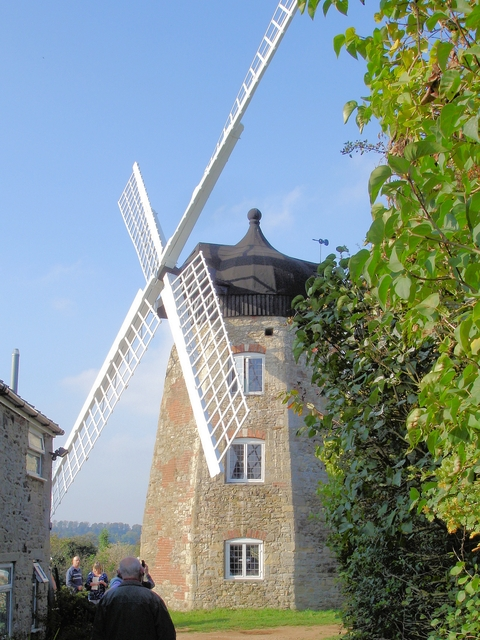
Wheatley Windmill, Oxfordshire.

Wheatley Windmill is an 18th-century tower mill at grid reference SP 589 053 between the hamlet of Littleworth and Wheatley in Oxfordshire, England. The windmill has an octagonal plan which narrows to form the circular rotating cap.

== History ==
The first written evidence concerning the mill is dated 1671, describing it as being "in a ruinous condition" even then. In 1760, there was significant fire and wind damage. New machinery was installed in 1784, supplied by the Eagle Ironworks in Oxford. After 1914, the mill fell into disuse and disrepair. However, the Wheatley Windmill Restoration Society has been restoring the windmill since 1977 and it is currently open to the public.

== The Mill Building ==
The octagonal shape of this 18th-century tower mill is distinctly unusual; there are only two or three such towers in the UK. The tower has three storeys. There are two fireplaces on the ground floor (some mills only had one, and others none at all) and a properly framed staircase leads to the 'stone floor', i.e. the first floor, where the mill stones are set. The original curved dome cap was copper clad and has been described as being 'picturesque without being elegant'. The windmill originally had four sails, which turned clockwise rather than the more common anticlockwise direction, although for a period it operated with only two sails. These were of the ‘common’ type, consisting of a wooden frame rigged with canvas that could be adjusted depending on wind conditions and the workload of the miller. The canvas used was similar to that used on Thames barges.

== See also ==
- List of windmills in Oxfordshire
