= Towersey Halt railway station =

Former railway station in Oxfordshire, England

Coordinates: 51.7374°N 0.9403°W

Towersey Halt
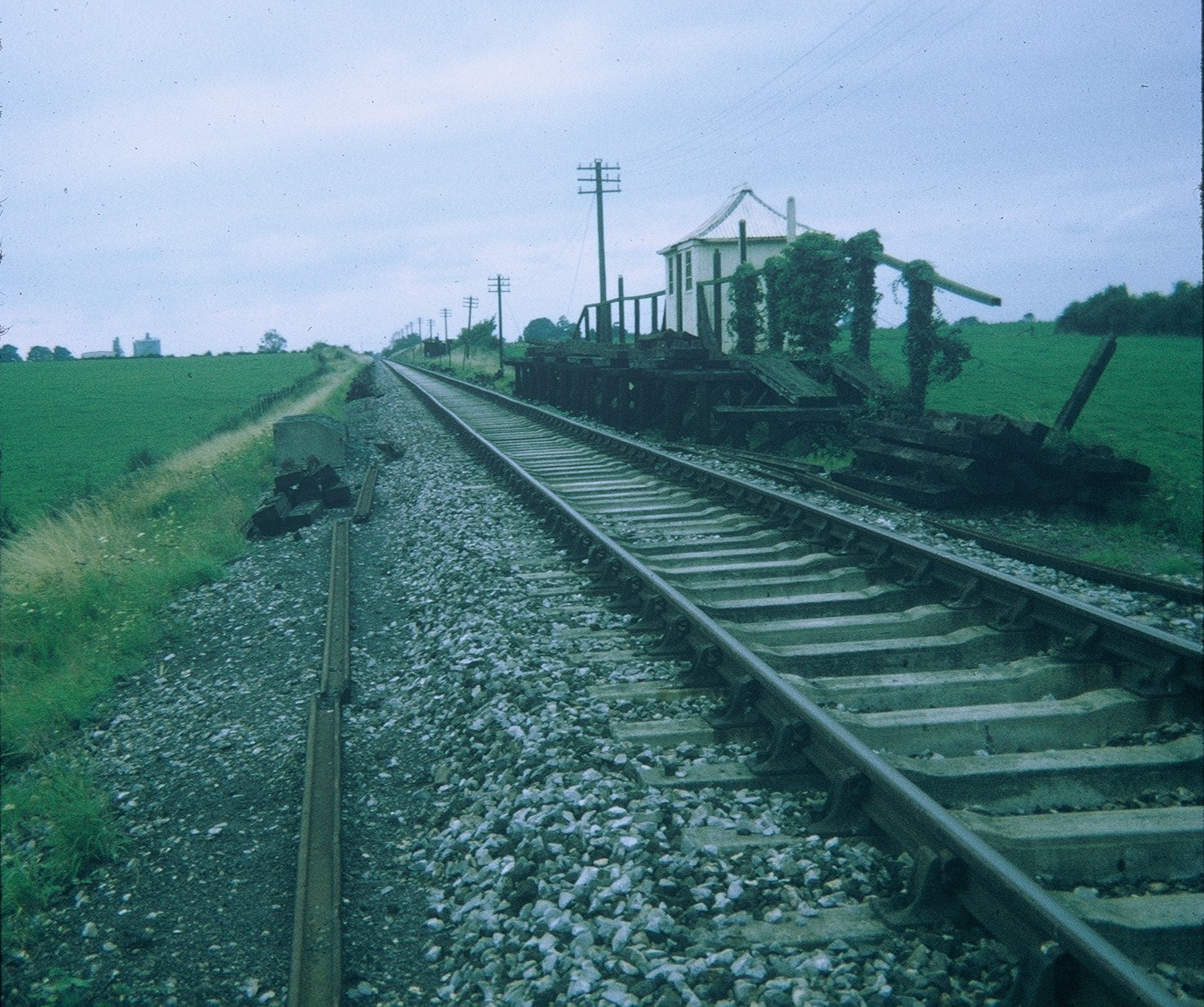
- The site of the station in 1969

General information
- Location: Towersey, South Oxfordshire; England
- Grid reference: SP732048
- Platforms: 1

Other information
- Status: Disused

History
- Original company: Great Western Railway
- Post-grouping: Great Western Railway; Western Region of British Railways

Key dates
- 5 June 1933: Opened
- 7 January 1963: Closed to passengers
- October 1991: line closed completely
Location

Towersey Halt railway station was an intermediate station on the Wycombe Railway which served the Oxfordshire village of Towersey from 1933 to 1963. The opening of the halt was part of an attempt by the Great Western Railway to encourage more passengers on the line at a time when competition from bus services was drawing away patronage. The possibility of reopening the line through Towersey Halt, which is now part of a long-distance footpath, has been explored by Chiltern Railways, the franchise holder for the Chiltern Main Line which runs through Princes Risborough.

== History ==
The Wycombe Railway (Extensions to Oxford and Aylesbury) Act 1861 (24 & 25 Vict. c. lxxxvii) giving authorisation for the extension of the Wycombe Railway's single track line beyond Princes Risborough to Oxford was passed on 28 June 1861. Thame was reached by 31 July 1862, and a regular service from Paddington via Maidenhead began the next day. By 1933, passenger numbers were dropping as a result of increased bus competition which led the Great Western Railway to introduce railmotors as an economy measure between Princes Risborough and Thame. A wooden halt was also opened to the south of the small village of Towersey on the up side of an embankment on the western side of a level crossing spanning the Thame - Towersey - Chinnor road. No more than 100 feet (30 m) long, the halt was supervised by the station master at Thame. As with similar GWR structures, Towersey Halt had very basic facilities: a small wooden pagoda-style passenger waiting shelter, two oil lamps and a running in board showing the station's name on both sides. To the east of the halt, Penn Farm had its own siding from the line's opening until 1939.

On the basis of an estimated saving of £34,372, passenger services were withdrawn between Oxford and Princes Risborough from January 1963. However, the track remained in use down to handle oil trains serving the BP depot at Thame. The depot finally closed in October 1991 and the track was dismantled.

Preceding station	Disused railways	Following station
Thame; Line closed, station closed	Western Region of British Railways; Wycombe Railway	Bledlow; Line closed, station closed

== Present day ==
Nothing remains of the halt, but the trackbed running through it has been incorporated into the Phoenix Trail, a long-distance footpath and cycleway.

As part of its preparations for its bid to run the Chiltern Railways franchise, Chiltern Railways announced in 2000 that it was looking into the possibility of reinstating passenger services on the line between Oxford and Risborough, the cost of which it estimated at £250m. It was decided instead to build a 3/4-mile (1.2 km) link between the Oxford to Bicester Line and the Chiltern Main Line in order to run through services between Oxford and London via High Wycombe.

== Sources ==
- Butt, R. V. J. (October 1995). The Directory of Railway Stations: details every public and private passenger station, halt, platform and stopping place, past and present (1st ed.). Sparkford: Patrick Stephens Ltd. ISBN 978-1-85260-508-7. OCLC 60251199. OL 11956311M.
- Clinker, C.R. (October 1978). Clinker's Register of Closed Passenger Stations and Goods Depots in England, Scotland and Wales 1830-1977. Bristol: Avon-Anglia Publications & Services. ISBN 0-905466-19-5.
- Mitchell, Vic; Smith, Keith (April 2003). Branch Lines to Princes Risborough from Aylesbury, Oxford and Watlington. Midhurst, West Sussex: Middleton Press. ISBN 1-904474-05-5.
- Oppitz, Leslie (2000). Lost Railways of the Chilterns. Newbury: Countryside Books. ISBN 1-85306-643-5.
- Potts, C.R. (2004). Oxford to Princes Risborough: A GWR Secondary Route. Usk, Mon.: The Oakwood Press. ISBN 0-85361-629-9.
- Simpson, Bill (2001). A History of the Railways in Oxfordshire; Part 2: The South. Witney, Oxon: Lamplight Publications. ISBN 978-1-899246-06-9.
