= Draycot, Oxfordshire =

Hamlet in Oxfordshire, England

Coordinates: 51.748°N 1.062°W

Draycot
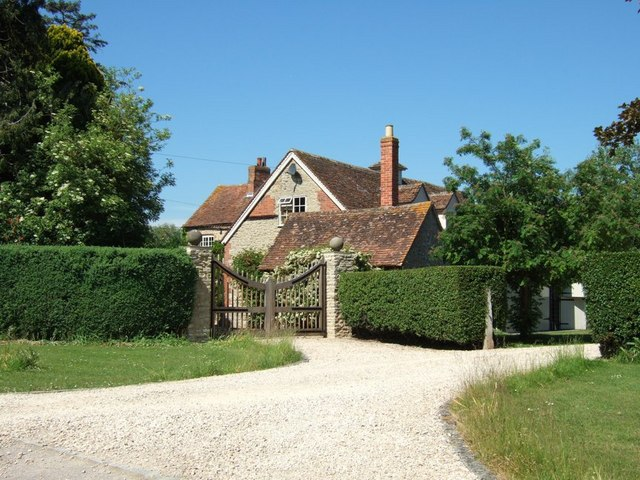

- Location within Oxfordshire
- OS grid reference: SP6460
- Civil parish: Tiddington-with-Albury
- District: South Oxfordshire
- Shire county: Oxfordshire
- Region: South East
- Country: England
- Sovereign state: United Kingdom
- Post town: Thame
- Postcode district: OX9
- Dialling code: 01844
- Police: Thames Valley
- Fire: Oxfordshire
- Ambulance: South Central
- UK Parliament: Henley and Thame

Draycot is a hamlet on the River Thame, in the civil parish of Tiddington-with-Albury, in the South Oxfordshire district, in the county of Oxfordshire, England. It is situated approximately 4½ miles to the west of Thame. In 1881 it had a population of 17.

The name derives from Old English dræg (a slipway or drag, a sledge, or a dray), with cot (a cottage or shelter).

After the Norman Conquest the lord of the manor was Richard, son of Rainfrid de Bretteville whilst Milo of Wallingford was tenant-in-chief. In 1086, the Domesday Book recorded Draycot as having seven households (five villager and two slave). There were two ploughlands, one lord's plough team, one men's plough team, and a ten acre meadow.

In 1886 the hamlet was incorporated into Waterstock civil parish, and subsequently in 1954 transferred to Tiddington-with-Albury, reducing Waterstock to 903 acres.
