= National Cycle Route 12 =

Cycle route in the United Kingdom

National Cycle Route 12 is part of the National Cycle Network managed by the charity the Walk Wheel Cycle Trust, formerly Sustrans. It currently has a length of 121 miles (195 km) but is incomplete. When fully constructed it will run from Enfield Lock (London) to Grimsby (Lincolnshire) in the United Kingdom.

== Route ==
=== Enfield to Hatfield ===
Enfield | Potter's Bar | Hatfield |

The route starts at Enfield Lock at the junction with National Cycle Route 1. The route is open and signed through Enfield to Chase Farm via Forty Hall Country Park. This section has recently been extended through new woodland for approximately 2 miles eastwards, but not yet through to Hadley Wood. For now, there is a possible route via this path and then an unsurfaced permissive path to Waggon Road, Hadley Wood.

At Hadley Wood station, route 12 starts again as The Great North Way and is continuous to north of Letchworth at the Hertfordshire County boundary. There is a short cut cycle route direct from the station to Waggon Road, with step free access from the north bound platform. The route is on road from Hadley Wood to Dancers Lane, then a bridleway to South Mimms services.

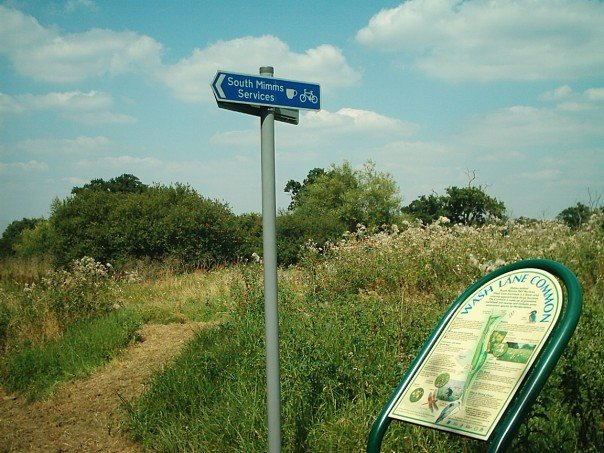
Cycle service station at South Mimms

At South Mimms route 12 has an entrance to South Mimms Services, the service station on the M25 and A1(M) motorways. North of South Mimms the route is mostly on segregated path to Hatfield, plus back streets in Welham Green.

=== Hatfield to Arlesey ===
Hatfield | Welwyn Garden City | Stevenage | Letchworth | Arlesey

In Hatfield there is a spiral bridge and a scenic off-road section through Streamwoods,. de-listed by the WWCT due to two gates which block use by tricycles and tandems. It can be avoided by following the cycle path along Travellers Lane and Woods Ave to Link Drive and then the newer cycle path via Hatfield Station and the Red Lion pub. The official route passes on road through Old Hatfield and near to Mill Green Museum (watermill), the off-road section then continuing into Welwyn Garden City. This section is shared in part with National Cycle Route 61. The cycle route then winds through the quiet streets of the Handside part of Welwyn Garden City to reach an off-road path through Sherrardspark Wood up to the Great North Road.

North-west of Welwyn Garden City from Ayot Green, where there is a junction with NCN57, NCN12 follows quiet country lanes but with some very steep hills (northbound) near Codicote. There is a useful cycling cafe, Spokes, just north of Codicote (not open Mondays and Tuesdays). It passes Knebworth House and then descends Old Knebworth Lane (busy at peak times) to join the off-road cycle path network through Stevenage and Old Stevenage. Another rural section, mostly off-road and partly unsurfaced leads to Letchworth where there is a choice of either a route to the east between Baldock and Letchworth or via the centre of Letchworth Garden City. This latter route takes in the UK's first gyratory roundabout. North of the county boundary the route can be followed on road in Stotfold and then off road to Arlesey station.

=== Arlesey to Huntingdon ===
Arlesey | Biggleswade | St Neots |Huntingdon

This section of the route is incomplete until the southern edge of Biggleswade. It is possible to follow bridleways to the west of Vine Farm and then east of the Biggleswade windfarm, joining the Biggleswade Green Wheel near Holme. At Biggleswade you can either follow route 12 through the town or use the Biggleswade Green Wheel to pass around the town to the east. Route 12 continues, signed, to Sandy and then via St Neots, Grafham Water and Brampton to Huntingdon.

=== Huntingdon to Spalding ===
Huntingdon | Peterborough | Spalding

North of Huntingdon route 12 (de-listed in part by the WWCT formerly Sustrans) takes a slightly roundabout rural route to Peterborough to avoid the A1(M) before continuing north through the city and then east to Spalding via Crowland, with its remarkable three way medieval Trinity Bridge.

Note that Route 12 running through Peterborough's Bridge Street has a cycling ban in place approximately Monday-Saturday 9:00 am – 6:00 pm and Sunday 9:00 am – 4:00 pm, so you will need to dismount or use the cycle route around the city centre to the west.

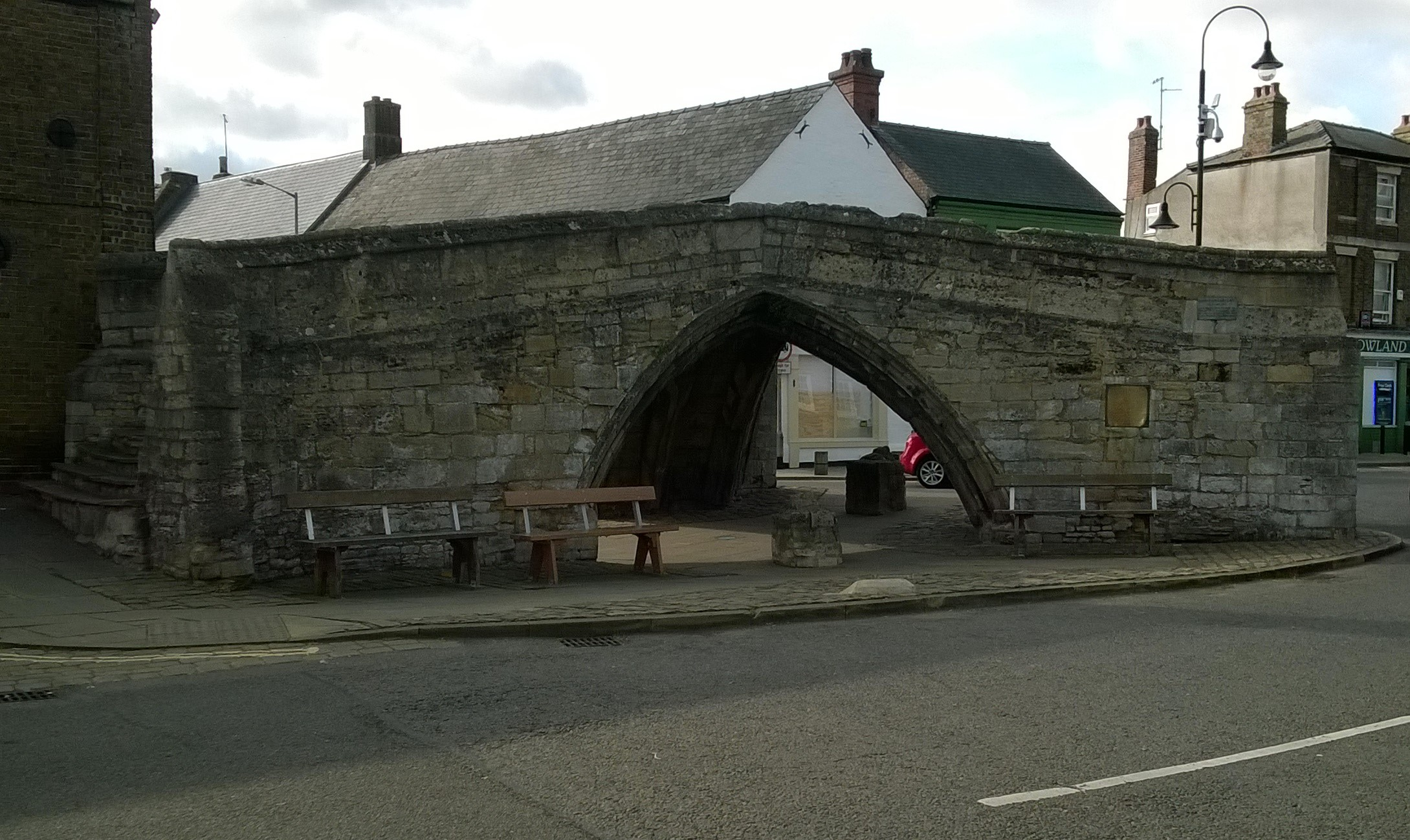
Trinity Bridge Crowland

As present there is no official route from Spalding to NCR 1 at Fossdyke Bridge, but an extension is planned. However, a combination of local roads and a byway open to all traffic can be used.

The route to Grimsby is undefined, but could be a new route off NCN1 at Boston following the Lincolnshire coast via Mablethorpe to Grimsby.
