= Morris Cowley railway station =

Former railway station in Oxfordshire, England

Coordinates: 51.7280°N 1.1983°W

Morris Cowley
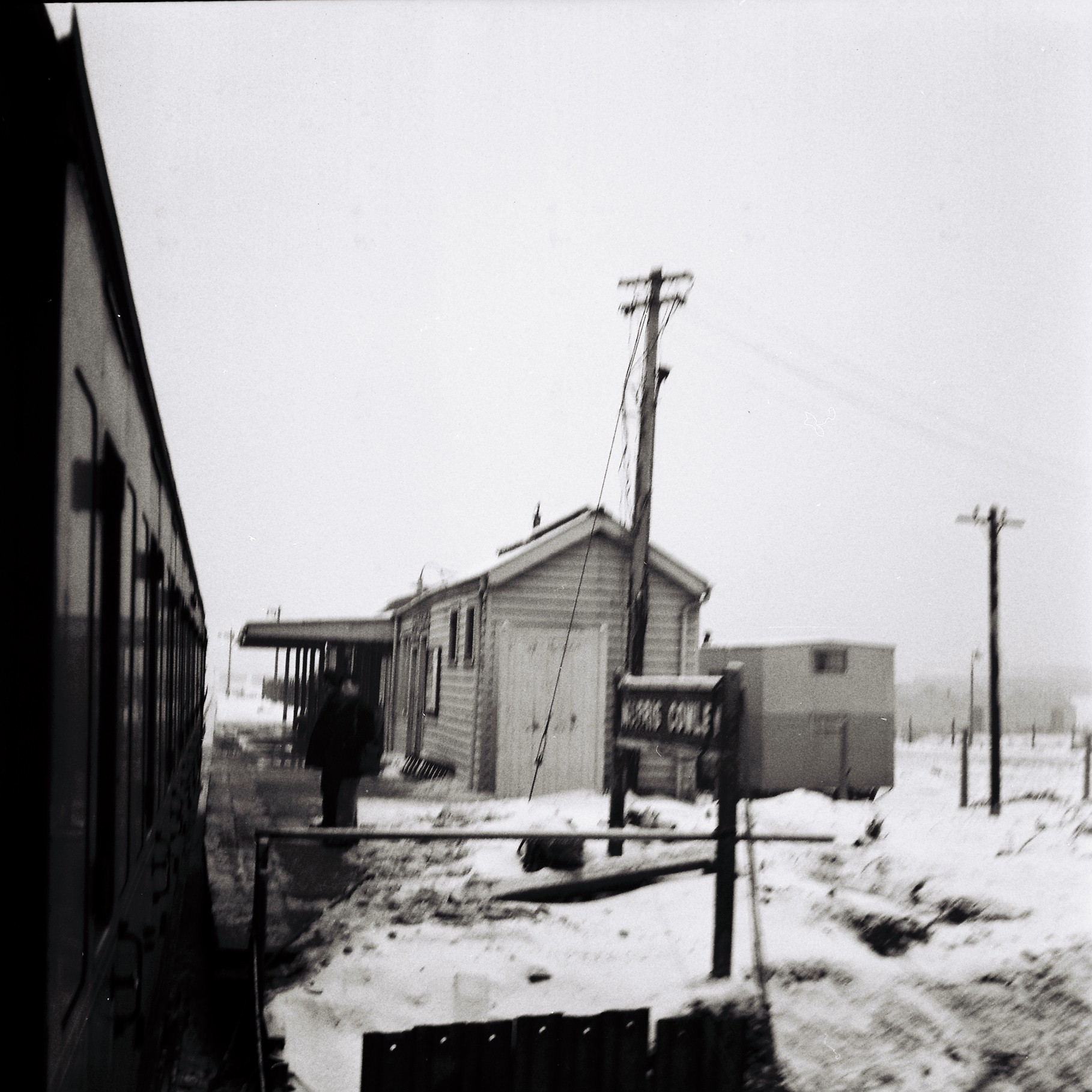
- The station in 1963

General information
- Location: Cowley, City of Oxford; England
- Grid reference: SP554035
- Platforms: 1

Other information
- Status: Disused

History
- Original company: Great Western Railway
- Pre-grouping: Great Western Railway
- Post-grouping: Great Western Railway; Western Region of British Railways

Key dates
- 1 February 1908: Opened as Garsington Bridge Halt
- 22 March 1915: Closed
- 24 September 1928: Reopened and renamed Morris Cowley
- 7 January 1963: Closed to passengers
Location

Morris Cowley was an intermediate station on the Wycombe Railway which served the small town of Cowley, just outside Oxford, from 1908 to 1915, and again from 1928 to 1963. The station originally opened as part of an attempt by the Great Western Railway to give more passengers access to the line, at a time when competition from bus services was drawing away patronage. The line through Morris Cowley remains open for the purposes of serving the BMW Mini factory.

In 2025, it was announced £120 million of funding had been allocated to re-open the line for passenger services between the station and Oxford.

== History ==
=== Garsington Bridge Halt ===
On 24 October 1864 the Wycombe Railway opened an extension of its single track line from Thame to Kennington junction, about 2 1/2 miles (4.0 km) south of Oxford. The line ran past Cowley but it was a further 40 years before a station was opened here.

In an attempt to stimulate Oxford suburban traffic, the Great Western Railway opened three motor halts on the line, one of which was to be situated to the south of the railway bridge over Garsington Road (now classified the B480). The station was named Garsington Bridge Halt and its opening was approved by the Board of Trade in December 1907. The first services, operated by GWR steam rail motors, ran on 1 February 1908. As with the other halts, Garsington Bridge had a single platform, 150 feet (46 m) long, with a 20-by-70-foot (6 m × 21 m) corrugated iron passenger shelter. Steps linked the halt with Garsington Road. The halt remained open for only seven years, being closed in 1915 as a First World War economy measure.

In May - June 1917, two loop sidings were opened on the Up side of the line to serve a munitions factory. By September 1917, the sidings were no longer required and were removed.

=== Growth of Morris Motors ===
By 1926, Morris Motors, based in Cowley since 1913, employed some 4,000 workers on their plant which covered some 80 acres (320,000 m^{2}) and produced 1,000 cars per week. Morris decided to concentrate the packing of cars for export at Cowley, the bulk of which would be moved to port by rail. Two sidings were installed in March 1926 to serve the adjacent Pressed Steel Company factory and five more were added in July 1928 for Morris Motors. Around the same time, Morris proposed to the GWR to open a passenger and goods station on the site of Garsington Bridge Halt and the new Morris Cowley station subsequently opened to passengers on 24 September 1928 and to goods on 10 December 1928. A new signal box was opened in October 1928 to control the sidings. Basic passenger facilities were provided: a single timber platform 400 feet (120 m) long and 12 feet (3.7 m) wide, together with a parcels and booking office, booking hall and toilets. Access to the station was via a footway leading up from Cowley Road. As production at the Cowley plant increased, so the freight facilities were extended. Car trains ran to Brentford Dock for export, reversing at Kennington junction, whilst a daily train ran from Bordesley. Special services were laid on for the workers, beginning with a through train that departed Banbury at 6:00 am, arriving at Cowley at 7:00 am. The return working left Cowley at 5:08 pm and reached Banbury at 6:06 pm. On Saturdays, a service left Cowley at 12:10 pm and ran to Kingham where it connected with a Banbury train.

=== War and post-war ===
During the Second World War the fields around Cowley were used for the storage of scrap aircraft parts and were depicted in Paul Nash's painting Totes Meer (Dead Sea). Ernest Fairfax also mentioned the scene in his book Calling All Arms. At this time, the factories at Cowley were used for the manufacture of new aircraft and the freight facilities there were substantially extended to handle the extra traffic, including the laying of two new private sidings in 1940 and 1943. Although the post-war period saw a decline in passengers and freight on the line in general, this was not the case at Morris Cowley. Figures from 1933 showed that 1,944 passenger tickets were sold in the year, whereas in July 1957, 1,350 passengers were reported to be using the station in a week. Freight forwarded had also risen from 16,490 tons to 77,147 tons.

=== Passenger services withdrawn ===
On the basis of an estimated saving of £34,372, passenger services were withdrawn between Oxford and Princes Risborough from January 1963. Freight services remained, the principal traffic being generated from Morris Cowley which sent five daily freight trains to Oxford. From May 1967, the line between Thame and Cowley was closed, leaving Morris Cowley to take over Wheatley's coal traffic (some 2,000 tons per year). From July 1968, Cowley no longer accepted coal traffic so that the area used could be given over to the loading and unloading of cars.

Preceding station	Historical railways	Following station
Littlemore; Line open, station closed	Great Western Railway; Wycombe Railway	Horspath Halt; Line closed, station closed

== Recent history ==
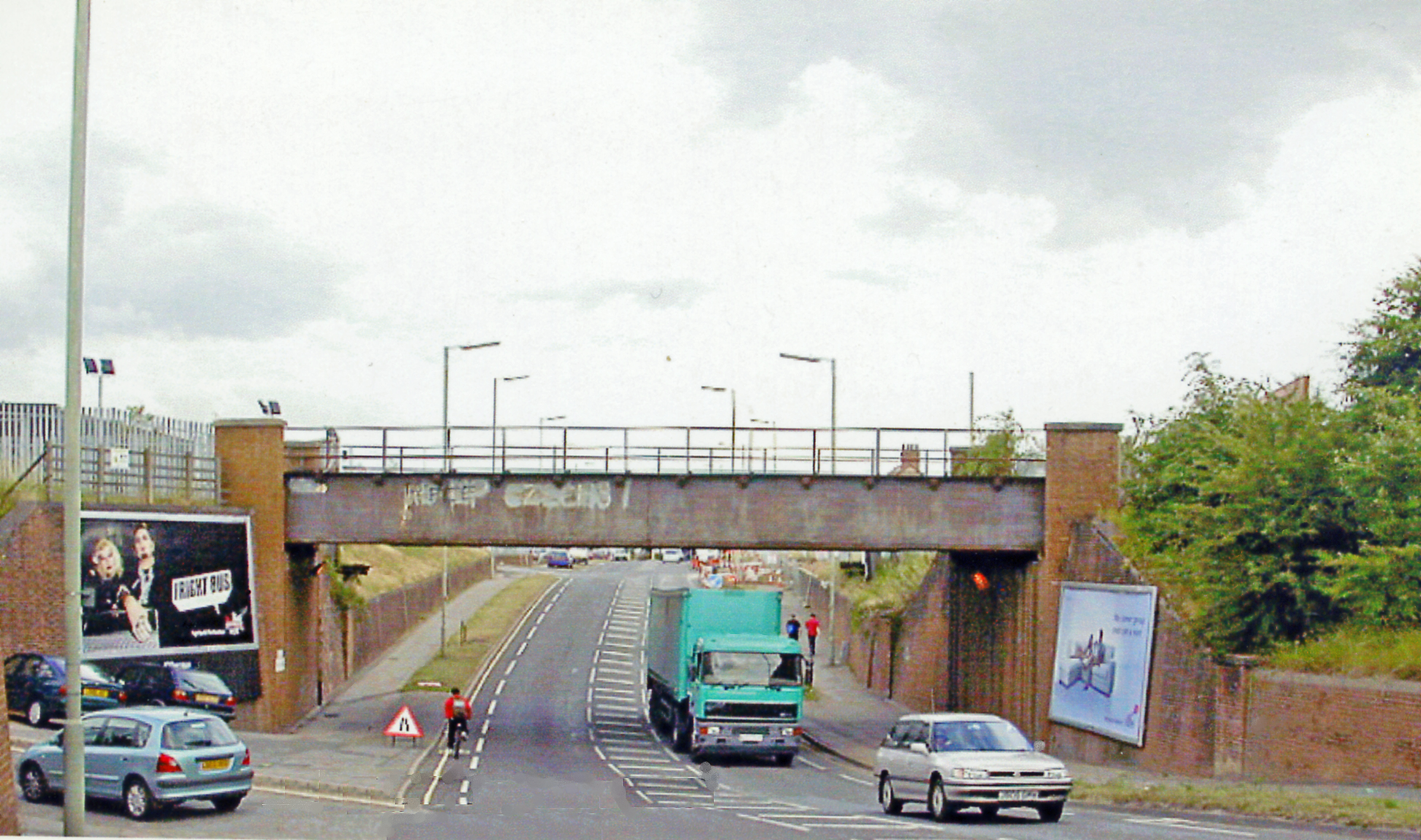
Near station site in 2004

=== Rationalisation ===
Cowley signal box closed from 28 January 1982 and the signals were removed except for the Up distant. A road-rail freight transfer terminal was opened on the site of the old goods shed in May 1984 by David Mitchell, Under-Secretary of State for Transport. The terminal was to be managed by F.C. Bennett, but in the event was only operational for 13 years. Diminishing rail traffic led to the Rover Group, which had taken over Mini production, acquiring the site for further expansion. Track rationalisation at Cowley in the early 1990s resulted in the down loop becoming a dead-end siding and three of the eleven remaining sidings being taken out of use.

=== BMW Mini ===
BMW acquired the Rover business in 1994 and ended production of the Rover model, in order to concentrate on the Mini. A new loading terminal was opened and five weekly double-deck car-carrying trains run from the plant, each carrying 264 cars to Purfleet in Essex for onward shipping to Zeebrugge. By 2001, approximately 35% of Cowley's production was sent by rail.

=== Proposed reopening for passengers ===
As part of its preparations for its bid to run the Chiltern Railways franchise, Chiltern Railways announced in 2000 that it was looking into the possibility of reinstating passenger services on the line between Oxford and Princes Risborough, the cost of which it estimated at £250m. It was decided instead to build a 0.75 miles (1.21 km) link between the Oxford to Bicester Line and the Chiltern Main Line in order to run through services between Oxford and London via High Wycombe.

Though this did not progress, Chiltern Railways announced in October 2014 that the current freight-only line could be upgraded to allow passenger trains to run from Oxford station to east Oxford, linking the city centre with business parks (Oxford Science Park) and residential areas such as Blackbird Leys and Littlemore. Since the line runs close to Oxford United Football Club's Kassam Stadium, Blackbird Leys Parish Council chairman, Gordon Roper, suggested that the line could relieve the traffic on matchdays, and the stadium car park could be used by commuters during the week.

Since 2014, the possibility of reinstating passenger services has been explored by Chiltern Railways, which currently runs services from Oxford to London Marylebone via Bicester Village. In November 2017, the chancellor, Philip Hammond, allocated £300,000 to develop a study to look at how new routes, services and stations could be built in Oxfordshire. This follows after the NIC report suggested the branch line could be reopened in 2019 to a limited service. This has been welcomed by Chiltern Railways who said they would work with other operators to get the line running in two years. In the NIC report it proposed 4 new stations at Iffley, Littlemore, Blackbird Leys and Cowley.

In January 2024, £500,000 was allocated by Oxford City Council to create designs for stations at Littlemore and Blackbird Leys. In 2025, it was announced £120 million of funding had been allocated to re-open the line. Preparations for passenger services will begin by Network Rail between July and August 2026.

== Bibliography ==
- Butt, R. V. J. (October 1995). The Directory of Railway Stations: details every public and private passenger station, halt, platform and stopping place, past and present (1st ed.). Sparkford: Patrick Stephens Ltd. ISBN 978-1-85260-508-7. OCLC 60251199. OL 11956311M.
- Clinker, C.R. (October 1978). Clinker's Register of Closed Passenger Stations and Goods Depots in England, Scotland and Wales 1830-1977. Bristol: Avon-Anglia Publications & Services. ISBN 0-905466-19-5.
- Mitchell, Vic; Smith, Keith (April 2003). Branch Lines to Princes Risborough from Aylesbury, Oxford and Watlington. Midhurst, West Sussex: Middleton Press. ISBN 1-904474-05-5.
- Oppitz, Leslie (2000). Lost Railways of the Chilterns. Newbury: Countryside Books. ISBN 1-85306-643-5.
- Potts, C.R. (2004). Oxford to Princes Risborough: A GWR Secondary Route. Usk, Mon.: The Oakwood Press. ISBN 0-85361-629-9.
- Simpson, Bill (2001). A History of the Railways in Oxfordshire; Part 2: The South. Witney, Oxon: Lamplight Publications. ISBN 978-1-899246-06-9.
- Waters, Laurence (1986). Oxford. Rail Centres. London: Ian Allan. ISBN 0-7110-1590-2.
