= Wheatley, Oxfordshire =

Village in Oxfordshire, England

Coordinates: 51.747°N 1.139°W

Wheatley
- Location within Oxfordshire
- Area: 4.39 km^{2} (1.69 sq mi)
- Population: 3,913 (2011 census) (parish, including Littleworth)
  - Density: 891/km^{2} (2,310/sq mi)
- OS grid reference: SP5905
- Civil parish: Wheatley
- District: South Oxfordshire
- Shire county: Oxfordshire
- Region: South East
- Country: England
- Sovereign state: United Kingdom
- Post town: Oxford
- Postcode district: OX33
- Dialling code: 01865
- Police: Thames Valley
- Fire: Oxfordshire
- Ambulance: South Central
- UK Parliament: Henley and Thame
- Website: Wheatley Parish Council

Wheatley is a village and civil parish in South Oxfordshire, England, about 5 miles (8 km) east of Oxford. The parish includes the hamlet of Littleworth, which is west of Wheatley.

== Archaeology ==
There was a Roman villa on Castle Hill, about 1 mile (1.6 km) southeast of the parish church. It was excavated in 1845, when Roman coins dating from AD 260 to 378 and fragments of Roman pottery and Roman tiles were found.

== Manor ==
The village had its beginnings in the Anglo-Saxon era. It is in a valley running eastwards, the stream of which flows through the centre of the village to join the River Thame, a tributary of the River Thames. The stream used to be in the open, with stepping stones for people to cross it. However, it is now in a culvert that runs along under the High Street.

In 1883 a Saxon cemetery was excavated, and artefacts removed from it are housed in the Ashmolean Museum in Oxford. In the 13th century Wheatley was part of the property of Abingdon Abbey, and in 1279 was described as a hamlet of Cuddesdon.

Wheatley manor house was enlarged and improved in 1601, and bears an inscription on the front stating T.A. 1601, which stands for Thomas Archdale, the then owner. It still retains its original appearance whereas most of the other old cottages and buildings have been restored.

== Churches ==
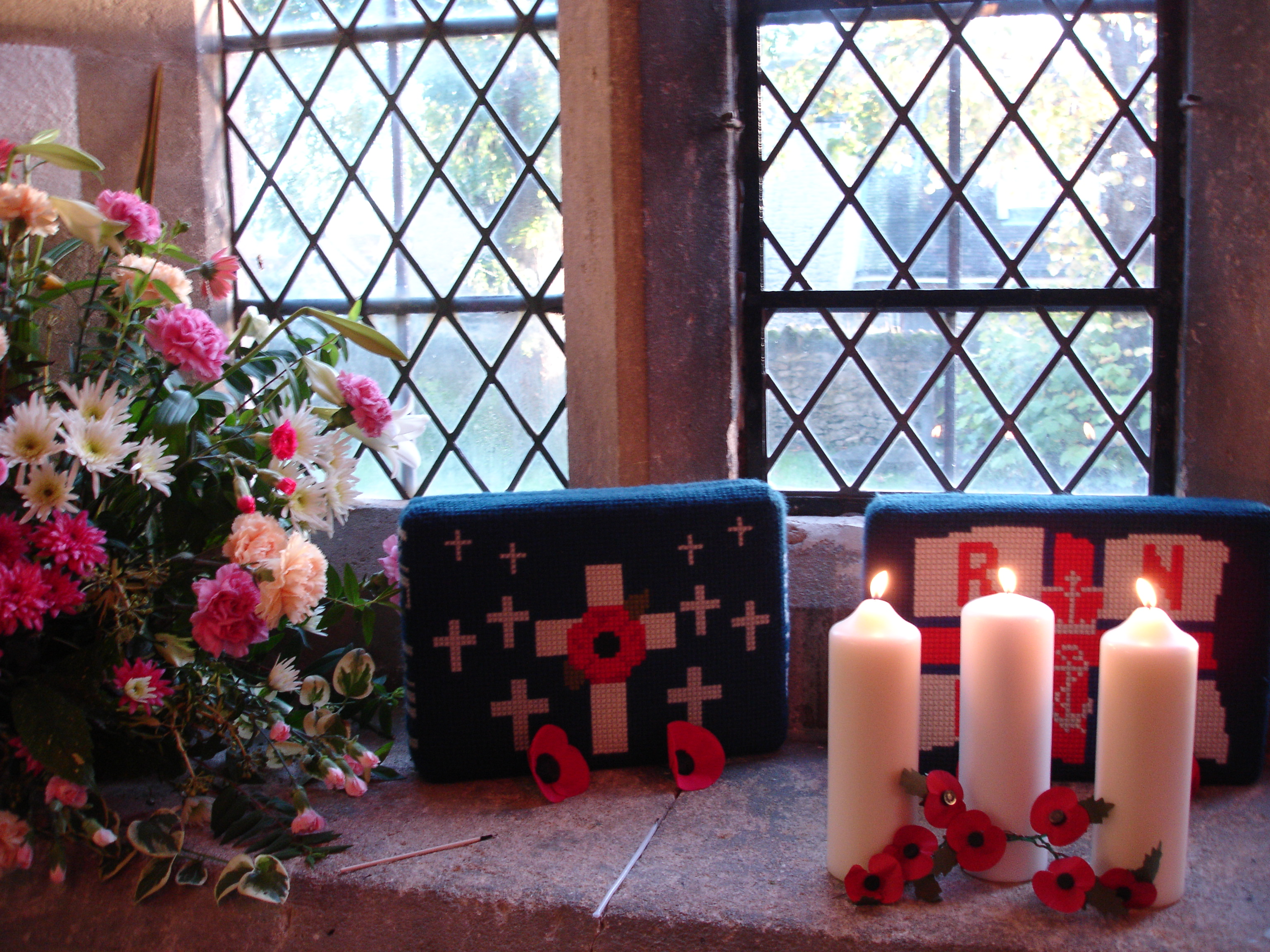
Candles lit in St Mary's parish church, Memorial Day, Wheatley

The parish church of Wheatley is St Mary the Virgin and was built during the 18th century. Samuel Wilberforce, Bishop of Oxford, disliked it and had it rebuilt in the 1850s by the Oxford Diocesan architect, GE Street. Its tower has a ring of six bells, four of which were cast in 1794 for the 18th-century church. There is also a Russian bell from Troitsa, thought to have been claimed as a spoil of war and given to the church early in the 20th century.

The Congregational church was built in 1842–43 on the site of the former tannery. It is now a United Reformed Church.

Wheatley's Roman Catholic church is Our Lady of Lourdes in Crown Road. It is part of the parish of Corpus Christi, Headington.

Wheatley Community Church is an evangelical church that formed in 2015. It meets weekly in the primary school.

There was an independent church in the old Granary building at 30 Church Road.

All the churches in Wheatley are now in a Local Ecumenical Partnership which also includes the parish church of Saint Bartholomew in Holton.

== Economic and social history ==
One of Wheatley's main industries was quarrying limestone which was used for building Windsor Castle, Merton College, local cottages and ecclesiastical buildings, most of which were erected between the 13th and 18th centuries. Other occupations included faggot cutting and ochre cutting, the ochre being crushed at the windmill which still stands today.

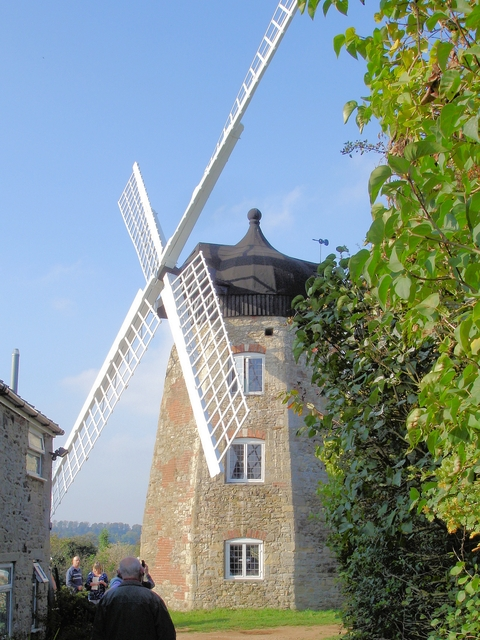
Wheatley Windmill

There were two windmills on the hill southwest of the village. One was a post mill that burned down in 1875. The other, Wheatley Mill, is an octagonal tower mill that dates from before 1671. It has been rebuilt and re-equipped a number of times, including in 1763 after a fire and in 1784 when the Eagle Ironworks, Oxford supplied some of the machinery. The tower mill had fallen out of use by 1914, and lightning struck it in 1939.

Wheatley once had ten pubs. A plaque on a gable of the King's Arms in Church Street says that it was built in 1756.

In 1719 the Stokenchurch Turnpike Act turned the main road into a turnpike. Stagecoaches between the Golden Cross in Oxford and London travelled via the Old Road over Shotover Plain to the west of the village. Many of Wheatley's inns had an upper entrance in Church Road and another in the High Street to accommodate the change of horses. The George coaching inn opposite the manor house is now a house with courtyards.

The village lock-up, built in 1834, is a stone building in the shape of a hexagonal pyramid, near the edge of the former quarry. It has a heavy padlocked door and the floor space is about 6 feet (1.8 m) square with a headroom of about 8 feet (2.4 m). In the 19th century it was used to lock up drunks overnight before sending them to the Oxford court. More recently it has been opened every May Day. For a small charge visitors can be locked up for five minutes or so, and given a certificate to prove it.

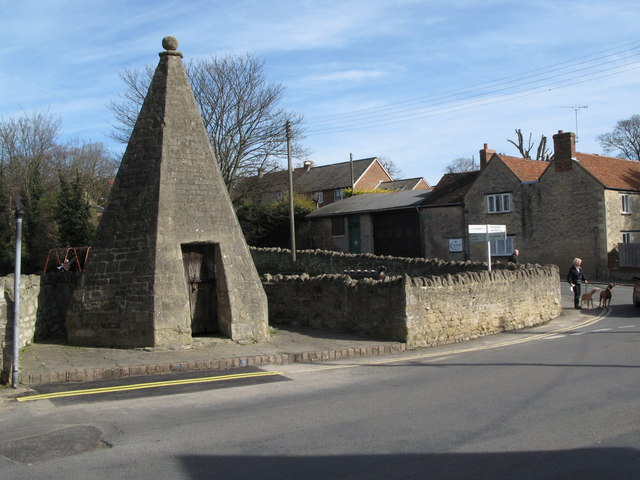
Village lock-up

Wheatley railway station was opened in 1864 as part of an extension of the Wycombe Railway from Thame to Oxford. The railway linked the village to Oxford, Princes Risborough, High Wycombe and Maidenhead. British Railways closed the line and Wheatley station in 1963. Kelham Hall Drive and Kimber Close have been built on the site of the station.

Shotover Park was the home of Lt Col Sir John Miller, who was Crown Equerry to Queen Elizabeth II. In 1888 his grandmother gave the building called the Merry Bells to the villagers as a temperance hotel as she was saddened to see so much hardship caused by drunkenness. Today the building houses a public library and is a social centre of the village. Ironically, it now has a licence to serve alcoholic drinks.

In the 20th century the Lady Spencer Churchill teacher training college was built on the north side of Wheatley. In 1976 the college merged with Oxford Polytechnic, which has since become Oxford Brookes University. The Oxford Brookes Wheatley campus closed in 2024 to be replaced by housing as the campus is being moved to the Headington Campus. As of May 2026, demolition of campus in preparation for the housing development had not commenced.

In 1974 the M40 motorway was extended from High Wycombe to Junction 8 at Chilworth, about 2 1/2 miles (4 km) east of Wheatley, giving the village a fast road link to London. In 1990 the M40 extension was completed, giving Wheatley a fast road link to Birmingham. The extension includes Junction 8A and Oxford Services about 1 1/2 miles (2.4 km) east of the village.

In 2020 Wheatley was awarded Fairtrade Village status as part of the Fairtrade Town initiative.

== Governance ==
Wheatley has three tiers of local government, at parish, district, and county level: Wheatley Parish Council, South Oxfordshire District Council, and Oxfordshire County Council. Wheatley Parish Council generally meets at the Merry Bells village hall at 89 High Street, and its office is at 89A High Street in the same building.

Wheatley
- Local Board District (1857–1894); Urban District (1894–1932)
- Population
  - 1891: 920
  - 1931: 1,268
- History
  - Created: 4 November 1857 (Local Board District); 31 December 1894 (Urban District)
  - Abolished: 31 March 1932
  - Succeeded by: Bullingdon Rural District
  - HQ: Wheatley
- Contained within
  - County Council: Oxfordshire

Wheatley was historically a hamlet in the ancient parish of Cuddesdon, which formed part of the Bullingdon Hundred. of Oxfordshire. Wheatley gradually gained its independence from Cuddesdon, having its own chapel of ease by 1427, appointing its own church wardens by the sixteenth century, and being made a separate ecclesiastical parish in 1854. The chapelry or ecclesiastical parish of Wheatley administered parish functions under the poor laws from the 17th century onwards, separately from other parts of Cuddesdon parish. As such, Wheatley also became a separate civil parish in 1866 when the legal definition of 'parish' was changed to be the areas used for administering the poor laws. From 1835 Wheatley was included in the Headington Poor Law Union.

Wheatley was made a local board district on 4 November 1857, with a local board established to look after public health and local government. Under the Local Government Act 1894, local board districts became urban districts on 31 December 1894. Wheatley was relatively small for an urban district, with its population by 1931 only having reached 1,268 people. Wheatley Urban District was abolished under a county review order, with the area being downgraded to a rural parish in the Bullingdon Rural District on 1 April 1932. Wheatley Parish Council was established as part of the change of status in 1932. Bullingdon Rural District in turn was abolished in 1974, becoming part of South Oxfordshire.

== Amenities ==
Wheatley has a Church of England county primary school and a County Council secondary school.

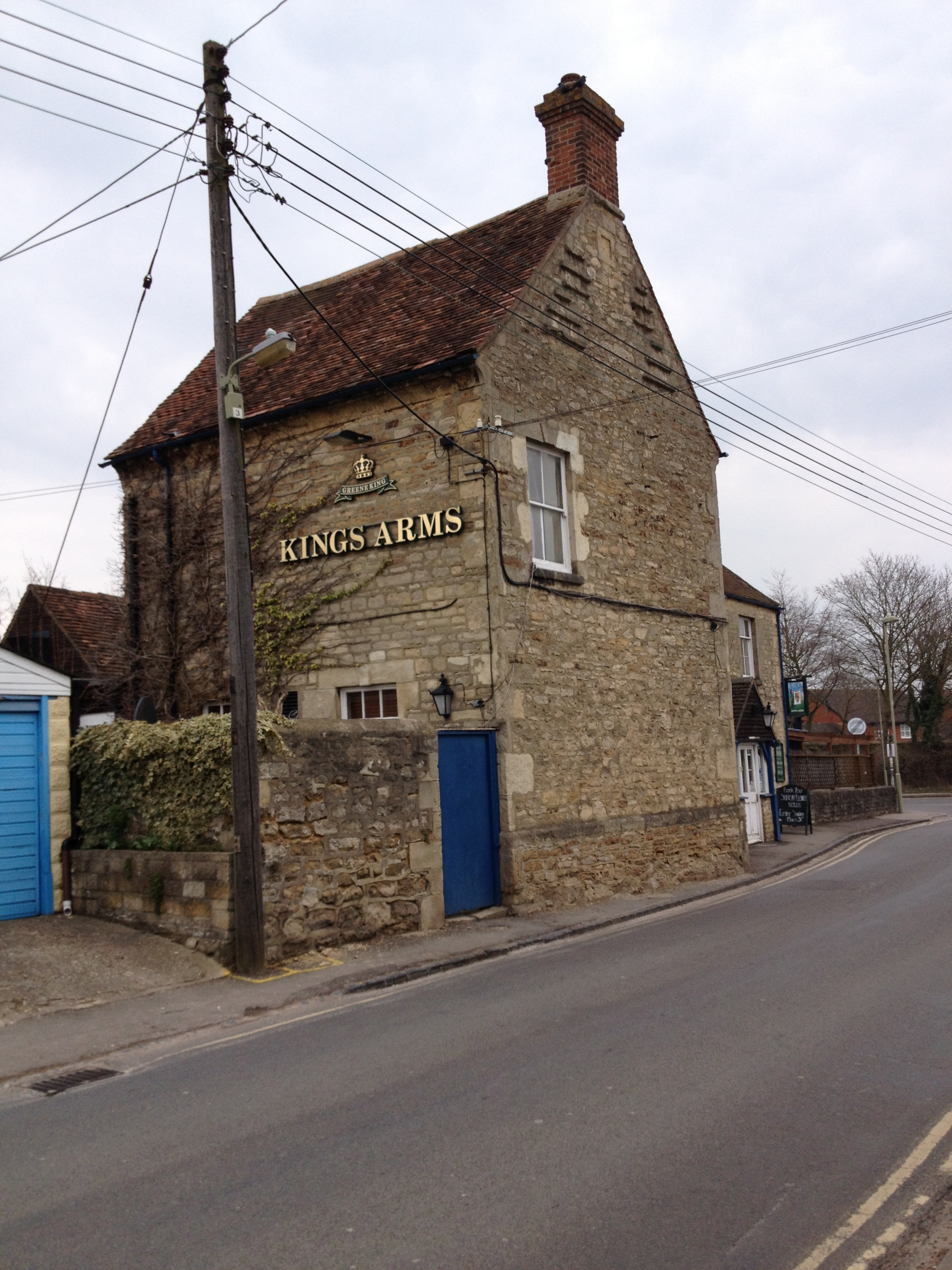
The Kings Arms pub

Wheatley has a post office, an Asda superstore with a petrol filling station, a pharmacy which is located next to Morland House Surgery, several shops in the High Street, and numerous village societies, including the Wheatley Society and a Village Produce Association which holds an annual show.

Wheatley has a Rugby Union Football Club that with two senior teams. Its First XV plays in the Berks/Bucks & Oxon Premier League. The club also offers junior rugby from ages seven onwards.

=== Buses ===
The Oxford Bus Company route 46 links Wheatley and Littleworth with Oxford via Horspath and Cowley, and to Great Milton in the opposite direction. Oxford Bus Company route 400/N400 links Wheatley with Harcourt Hill via Oxford and to Thame on Sundays and route 280 to Thame on weekdays. The Redline Buses route X20 links Wheatley to Aylesbury via Thame and Haddenham and to Oxford via Headington in the opposite direction. The Carousel Buses 275 links Wheatley to High Wycombe via Chinnor and to Oxford via Headington.

== Bibliography ==
- Hassall, WO, ed. (1956). "Wheatley Records 956–1956". Oxford Record Series. XXXVII. Banbury: Oxfordshire Record Society: 27–30.
- Lobel, Mary D, ed. (1957). A History of the County of Oxford. Victoria County History. Vol. 5: Bullingdon Hundred. London: Oxford University Press for the Institute of Historical Research. pp. 96–116.
- Sherwood, Jennifer; Pevsner, Nikolaus (1974). Oxfordshire. The Buildings of England. Harmondsworth: Penguin Books. pp. 837–838. ISBN 0-14-071045-0.
