= Tiddington, Oxfordshire =

Village in Oxfordshire, England

Coordinates: 51.742°N 1.063°W

Tiddington
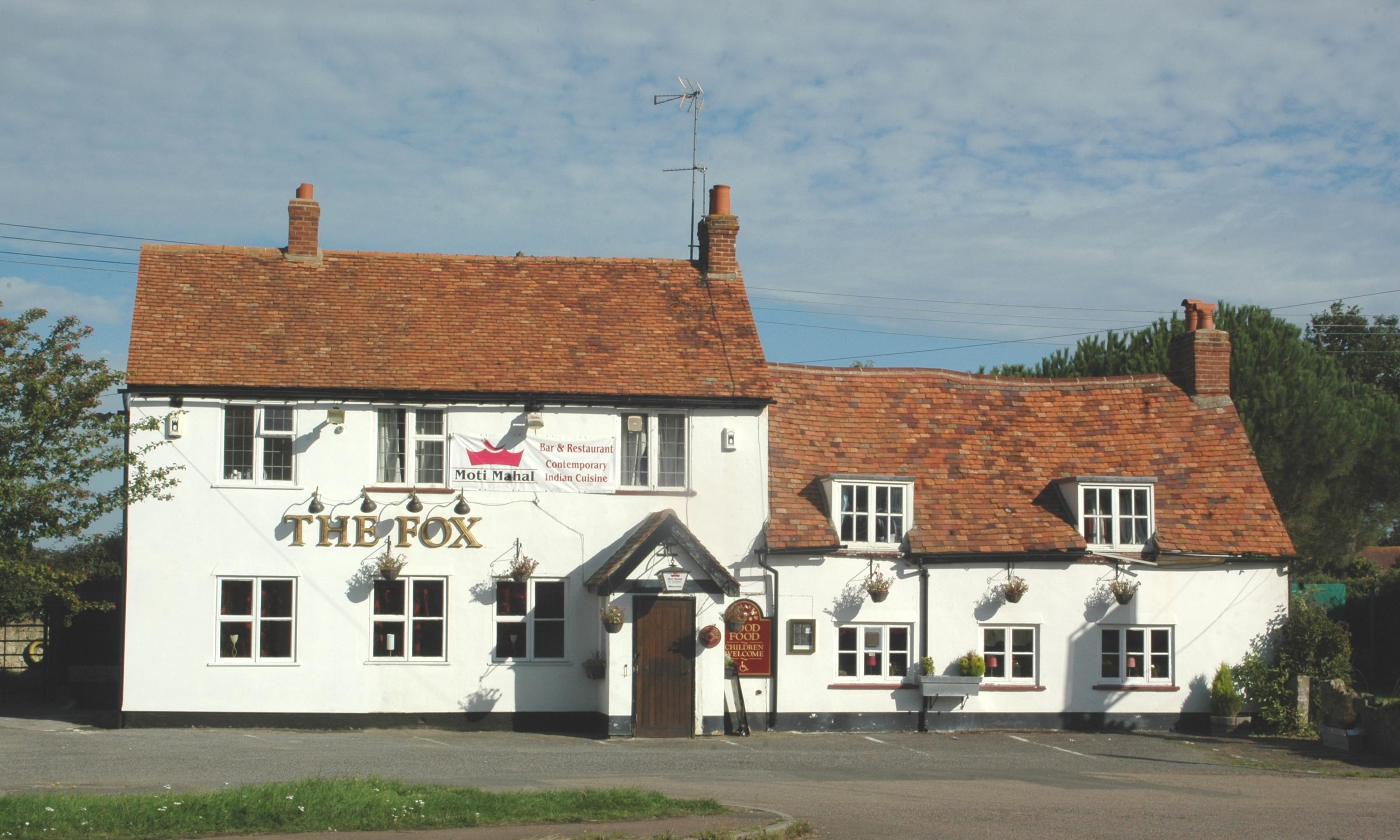
- The Fox public house

- Location within Oxfordshire
- Population: 683 (parish, with Albury) (2011 Census)
- OS grid reference: SP648051
- Civil parish: Tiddington-with-Albury
- District: South Oxfordshire
- Shire county: Oxfordshire
- Region: South East
- Country: England
- Sovereign state: United Kingdom
- Post town: Thame
- Postcode district: OX9
- Dialling code: 01844
- Police: Thames Valley
- Fire: Oxfordshire
- Ambulance: South Central
- UK Parliament: Henley
- Website: Tiddington with Albury Parish Council

Tiddington is a village in the civil parish of Tiddington-with-Albury, in the South Oxfordshire district, in Oxfordshire, England. It is about 3 1/2 miles (5.6 km) west of Thame, on the A418 road between Thame and Oxford. The 2011 Census recorded Tiddington-with-Albury's population as 683. Tiddington is on the county boundary with Buckinghamshire. It was a manor and hamlet of the parish of Albury, although for most of its history it has been a larger place than Albury. In 1866 Tiddington became a separate civil parish, on 1 April 1932 the parish was merged with Albury to form "Tiddington with Albury". In 1931 the parish had a population of 163.

== School ==
It was recorded in 1786 that in 1737 Lady Mary Bertie, widow of the 2nd Earl of Abingdon had bequeathed £100 for a school in the parish of Albury. This was invested and used to support a schoolteacher, sometimes in Albury and other times in Tiddington. By 1819 the school taught 12 boys funded by Lady Bertie's charity plus other pupils whose families paid fees. There are no records of girl pupils being admitted until 1846.

In 1870 the school became a National School, and in 1874 its new school building opened with one classroom, which had capacity for 44 pupils. It had about 30 pupils until 1926, when it was reorganised as a junior school and senior pupils were transferred to the school at Great Haseley. In the 1950s it was still open as Tiddington with Albury Church of England Primary School, but it has since closed.

== Transport ==
Between 1867 and 1963 the village was served by Tiddington railway station on the Wycombe Railway that linked Oxford and Maidenhead. Arriva Shires & Essex bus routes 280 and X8, which link Oxford and Aylesbury, serve the village. The Oxfordshire Way Long-distance footpath passes through the village.

== Amenities ==
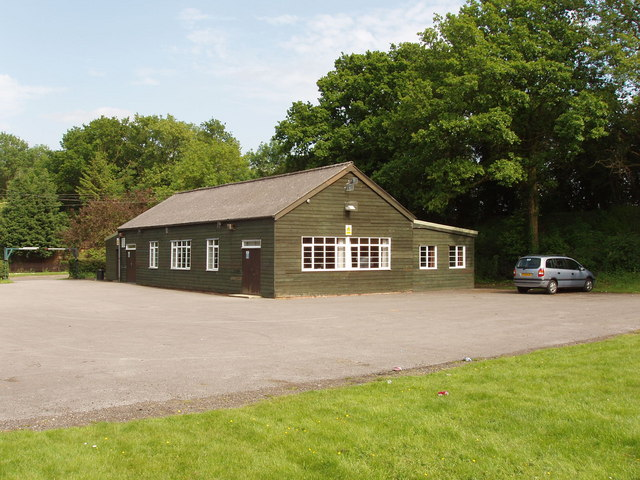
Tiddington Village Hall

The village has a public house, The Fox. For a few years it was a bar and restaurant called the Moti Mahal, which is Urdu for "Pearl Palace". It has now been converted back to a pub, reopened in November 2014 as The Fox and Goat, and is now a restaurant and hotel as well as a pub.

Tiddington has a village hall. There is a Waterstock and Tiddington Women's Institute. Since 1952 an annual tug of war with the neighbouring Buckinghamshire parish of Ickford has been held each summer across the River Thame, which here forms the boundary between both the two parishes and the two counties.
