= Littleworth, South Oxfordshire =

Hamlet in Oxfordshire, England

Coordinates: 51.745°N 1.152°W

Littleworth
- Location within Oxfordshire
- OS grid reference: SP5905
- Civil parish: Wheatley
- District: South Oxfordshire
- Shire county: Oxfordshire
- Region: South East
- Country: England
- Sovereign state: United Kingdom
- Post town: Oxford
- Postcode district: OX33
- Dialling code: 01865
- Police: Thames Valley
- Fire: Oxfordshire
- Ambulance: South Central
- UK Parliament: Henley
- Website: Wheatley Parish Council

Littleworth is a hamlet in South Oxfordshire, about 4 1/2 miles (7 km) east of Oxford, England. It is in Wheatley civil parish, immediately west of Wheatley village.

== History ==
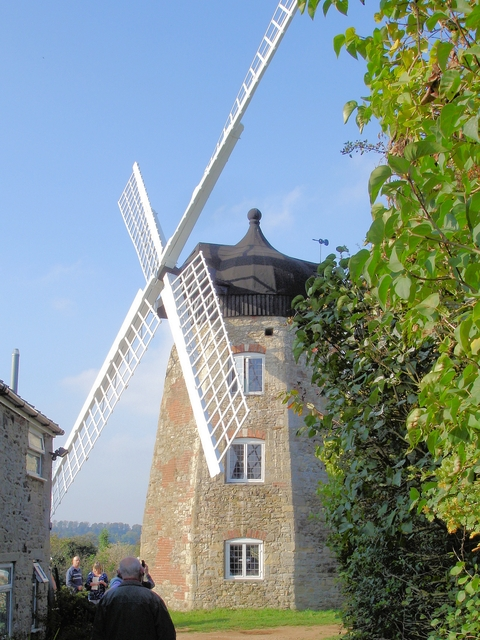
Wheatley Mill

There were two windmills on the hill about 300 yards (270 m) south of the hamlet. One was a post mill that burned down in 1875. The other, Wheatley Mill, is an octagonal tower mill that dates from before 1671. It has been rebuilt and re-equipped a number of times, including in 1763 after a fire and in 1784 when the Eagle Ironworks, Oxford supplied some of the machinery. The tower mill had fallen out of use by 1914, and lightning struck it in 1939.

Since 1976 the windmill has been under restoration. The mill is open to the public one Sunday a month from May until October.

In 1864 an extension of the Wycombe Railway from Thame to Oxford was built through Littleworth. British Railways closed the line and Wheatley station in 1963. Most of its route through Littleworth was in a cutting, with single-arched brick bridge that still carries Littleworth Road over it.

== Amenities ==
Littleworth has one public house, the Cricketer's Arms free house.

Oxford Bus Company route 46 links Littleworth with Oxford via Horspath, Cowley and with Great Milton via Wheatley. Buses run hourly, seven days a week, from early morning until after midnight.
