= Phoenix Trail =

The Phoenix Trail
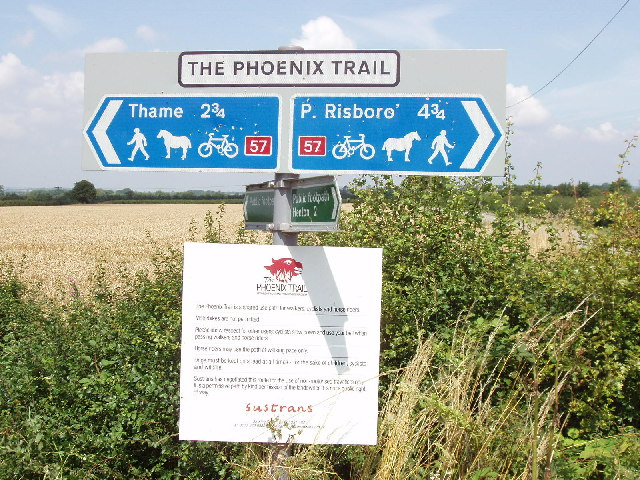
- Length: 7 mi (11 km)
- Location: Buckinghamshire and Oxfordshire
- Trailheads: Thame; 51.7461°N 0.9761°W; Princes Risborough; 51.7244°N 0.8323°W
- Use: Hiking, Cycling

The Phoenix Trail is a 7-mile (11 km) footpath and cycleway which runs between the market towns of Thame in South Oxfordshire and Princes Risborough in Buckinghamshire, passing through the villages of Towersey and Bledlow.

== History ==
The trail largely follows the route of a disused railway line, the Wycombe Railway, which connected Princes Risborough and Thame with the city of Oxford. The line through Thame remained open until 1991 to serve an oil depot based in the town. It was subsequently purchased by Sustrans and converted into a cycle/pedestrian route.

The Phoenix Trail forms part of National Cycle Route 57 which also includes the Nicky Line and Ayot Greenway rail trails. As well as cyclists and walkers, the route is suitable for wheelchair and pushchair users, as it is flat and surfaced, with seating every 500 metres. The first 2 1/2 miles (4.0 km) out of Thame are surfaced with tarmac and the remainder with compacted limestone dust. Red kites can commonly be seen along the route. There is a collection of 30 sculptures built by Angus Ross and six furniture students from Thame's Rycotewood College, which draw on the trail's railway heritage and the landscape towards the Chiltern Hills. These sculptures won the 2002 "Arts, Business & Community" Award from Arts & Business, and the trail also holds a Certificate of Distinction as a European Greenway from the European Commission.

In June 2008, an extension of the Phoenix Trail to Lord Williams's School (51.7465°N 0.9895°W) was officially opened.

== See also ==
- Rail Trail
- National Cycle Network
- Segregated cycle facilities
- Sustainable transport
