= Wheatley railway station =

Former railway station in Oxfordshire, England

Coordinates: 51.7455°N 1.1393°W

Wheatley
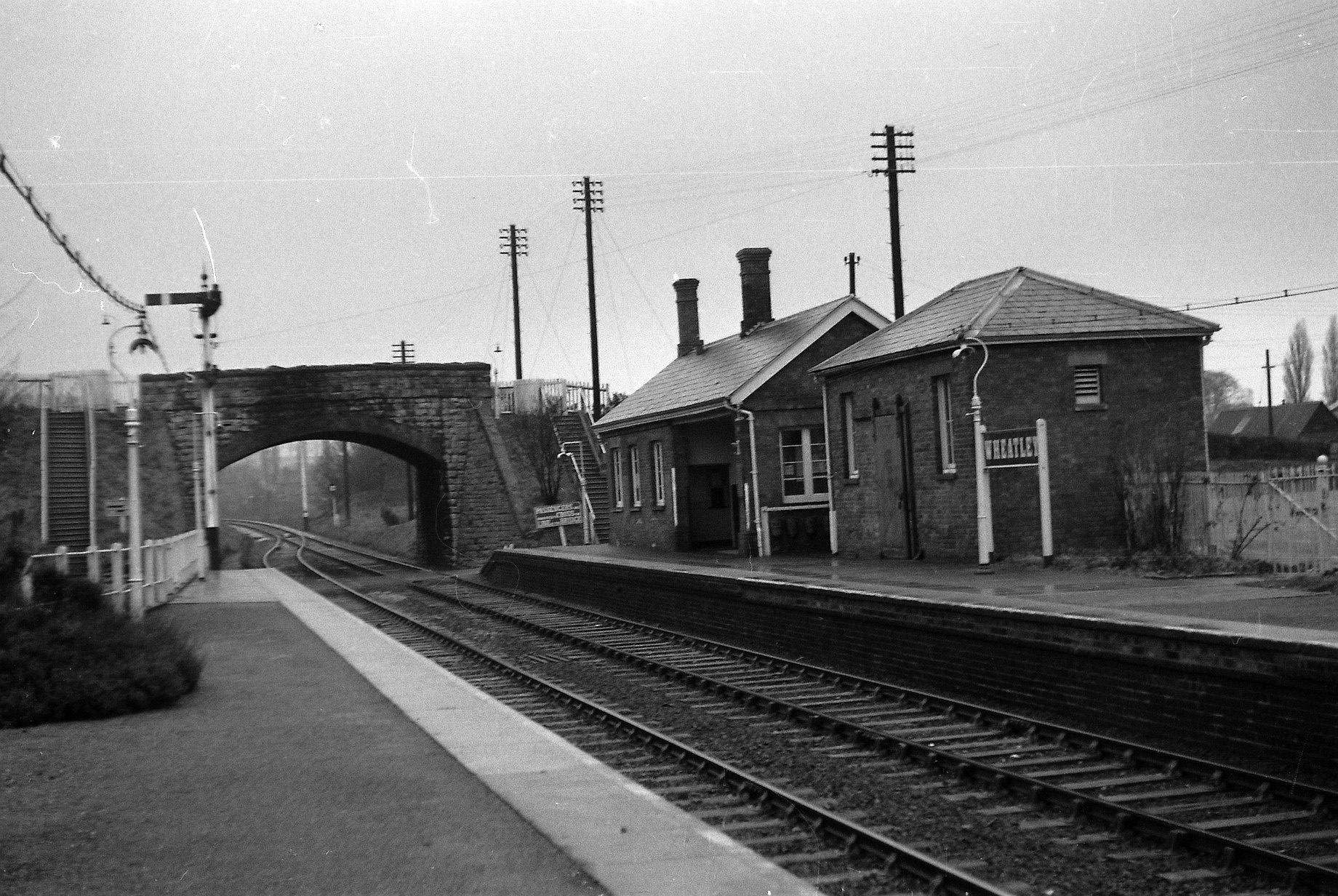

General information
- Location: Wheatley, South Oxfordshire; England
- Grid reference: SP595055
- Platforms: 2

Other information
- Status: Disused

History
- Original company: Wycombe Railway
- Pre-grouping: Great Western Railway
- Post-grouping: Great Western Railway

Key dates
- 25 October 1864: Station opened
- 7 January 1963: Station closed
Location

Wheatley railway station was on the Wycombe Railway and served the village of Wheatley in Oxfordshire.

It was opened in 1864 as part of an extension from Thame to Oxford. The steep road of Ladder Hill crossed the railway by a bridge, with the station on the east side of Ladder Hill.

In January 1963 British Railways withdrew passenger services between Princes Risborough and Oxford, and closed all intermediate stations including Wheatley. The station and route were included in the 1963 Beeching Report, even though passenger services had already ended. Some goods services and diverted passenger trains continued along the line until the track was closed between Thame and Morris Cowley in 1968.

Kelham Hall Drive and Kimber Close have been built on the site of Wheatley station. The former “Railway Hotel” public house in Wheatley had a bar decorated with many items of railway memorabilia, some of which related to the former railway through Wheatley station.

Preceding station	Disused railways	Following station
Horspath Halt; Line closed, station closed	Western Region of British Railways; Wycombe Railway	Tiddington; Line closed, station closed
