= Thame railway station =

Former railway station in Oxfordshire, England

Thame
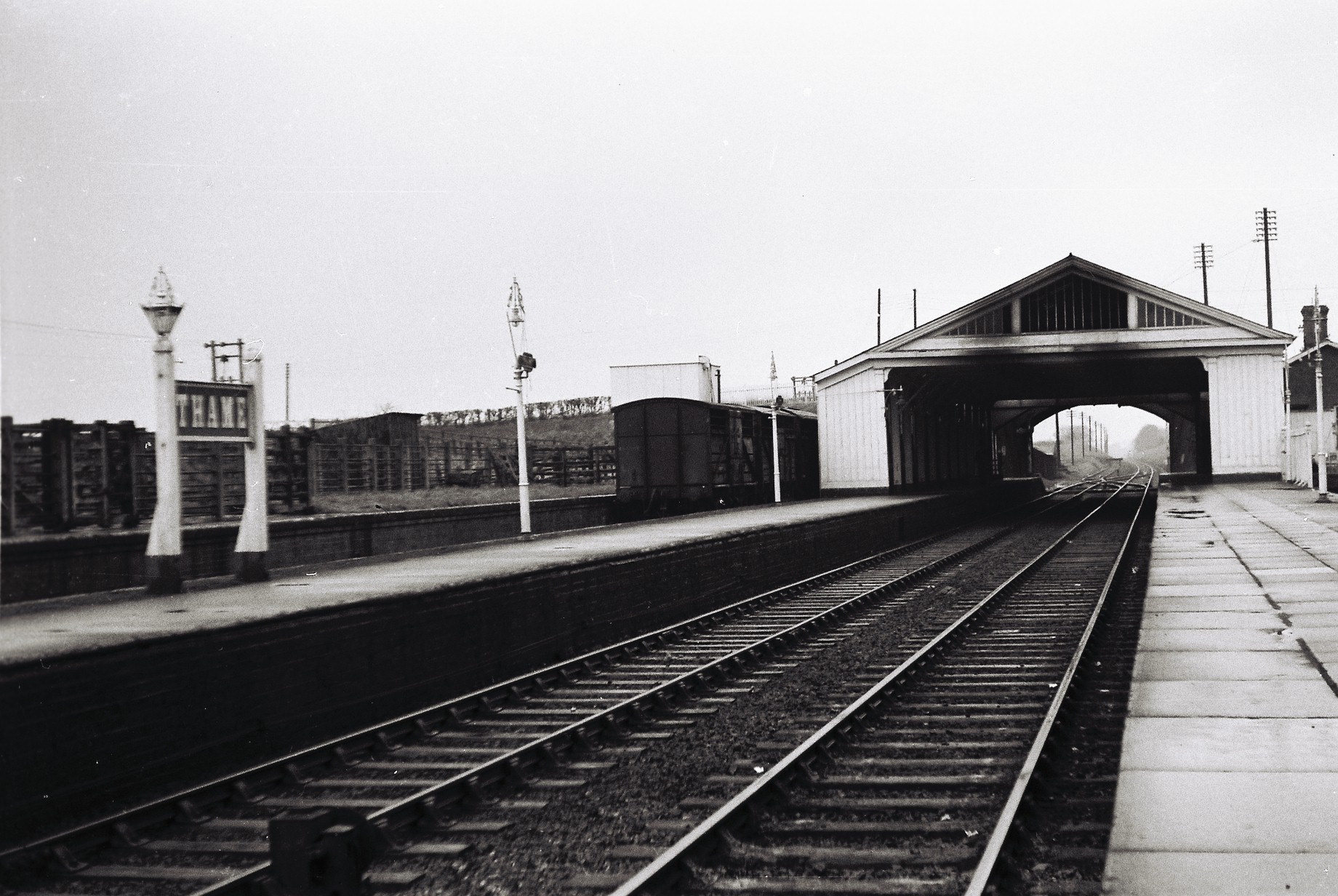
- Station in 1959.

General information
- Location: Thame, South Oxfordshire; England
- Coordinates: 51.7411°N 0.9693°W
- Grid reference: SP713052
- Platforms: 2

Other information
- Status: Disused

History
- Original company: Wycombe Railway
- Pre-grouping: Great Western Railway
- Post-grouping: Great Western Railway

Key dates
- 1862: Station opened
- 1963: passenger service withdrawn
- 1991: station closed for freight
Location

Thame railway station was a station on the Wycombe Railway serving the town of Thame in Oxfordshire. It was opened in 1862 as the terminus of an extension from High Wycombe via Princes Risborough The cost of construction of the station building was £2,201 1s 5d additional general works were £2,137 8s 8d. In 1864 the line was extended from Thame to Oxford. The station was built with a train shed over its platforms.

== Construction ==
As originally built Thame station only had a single platform with an engine shed on the south side on the location where later cattle pens were built. Some time between 1864 and 1893 the engine shed was demolished and a second platform built. The trainshed roof was extended on one side to provide a cover over the new platform.

Thame and the first station at High Wycombe were the same in design and dimensions, although different construction materials were used for each: the train-shed walls at Thame were timber, while Wycombe's were flint and brick.

The station was provided with a 28 lever signal box, with ETB using Tyer's key token machines in operation.

== Discontinuation of passenger service ==
In January 1963 British Railways withdrew passenger services between Princes Risborough and Oxford, and closed all intermediate stations including Thame. Later the track was dismantled between Thame and Morris Cowley. A BP depot remained at Thame and the line from Princes Risborough remained open for oil trains to serve it. In 1991 the oil depot was closed. In 1998 all track between Thame and Princes Risborough was lifted, with the exception of a short stub at the Princes Risborough end.

== Current status ==
After closure the route from Thame to Princes Risborough was subsequently purchased by Sustrans and converted into a cycle/pedestrian route under the title of The Phoenix Trail and forms part of the UK National Cycle Route 57. The road bridges that crossed the line at either end of Thame Station and its two platforms are still there, although the station building and trainshed roof have gone.

Thame is now served by Haddenham & Thame Parkway, 2 miles (3.2 km) north-east of the town, which opened in 1987 on the Chiltern Main Line.

| Preceding station | Disused railways | Following station |
|---|---|---|
| Tiddington; Line closed, station closed | Western Region of British Railways; Wycombe Railway | Towersey Halt; Line closed, station closed |
