= Rose Isle =

Island in the River Thames, England

Coordinates: 51.7185°N 1.2383°W

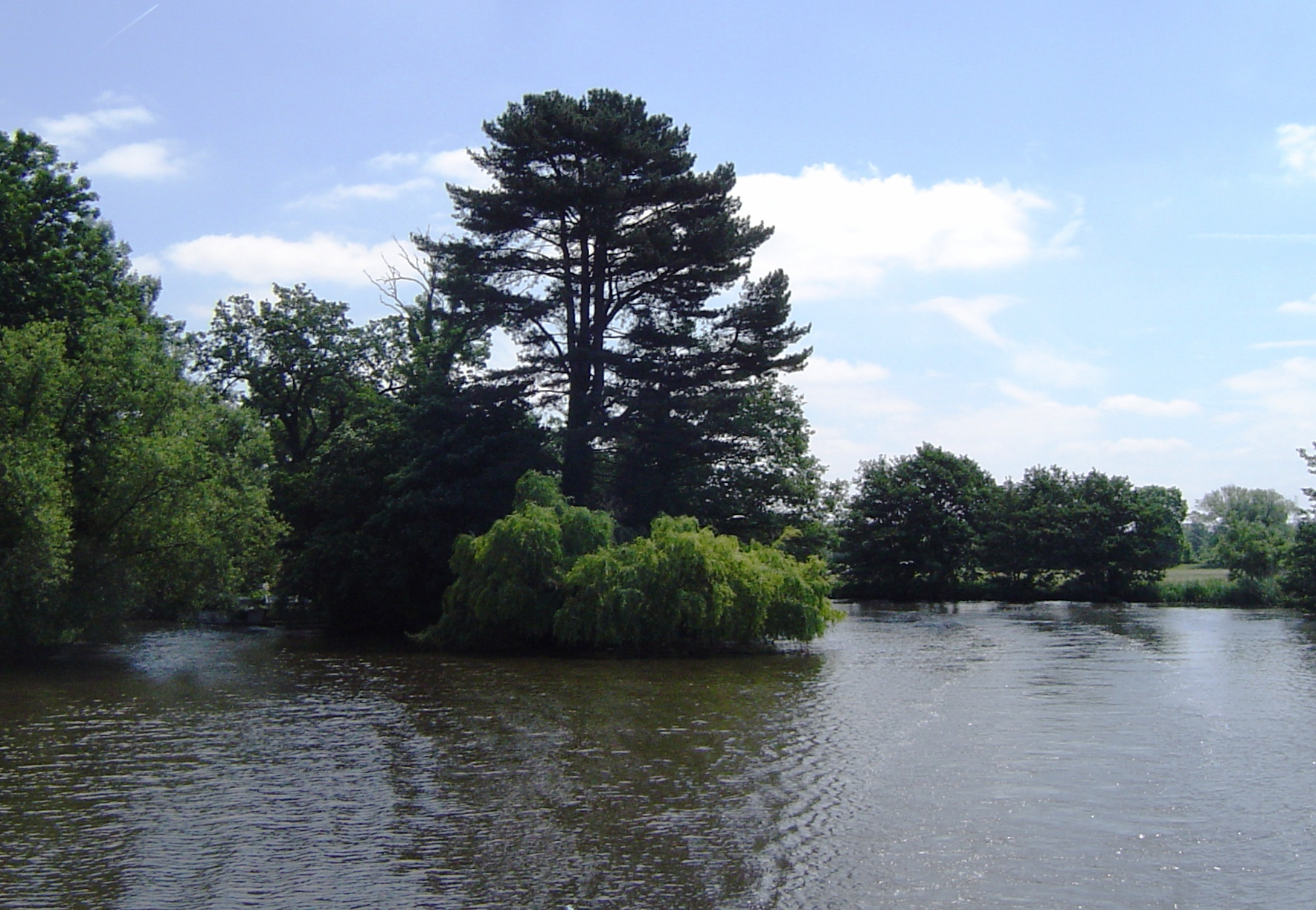
Rose Isle from upstream

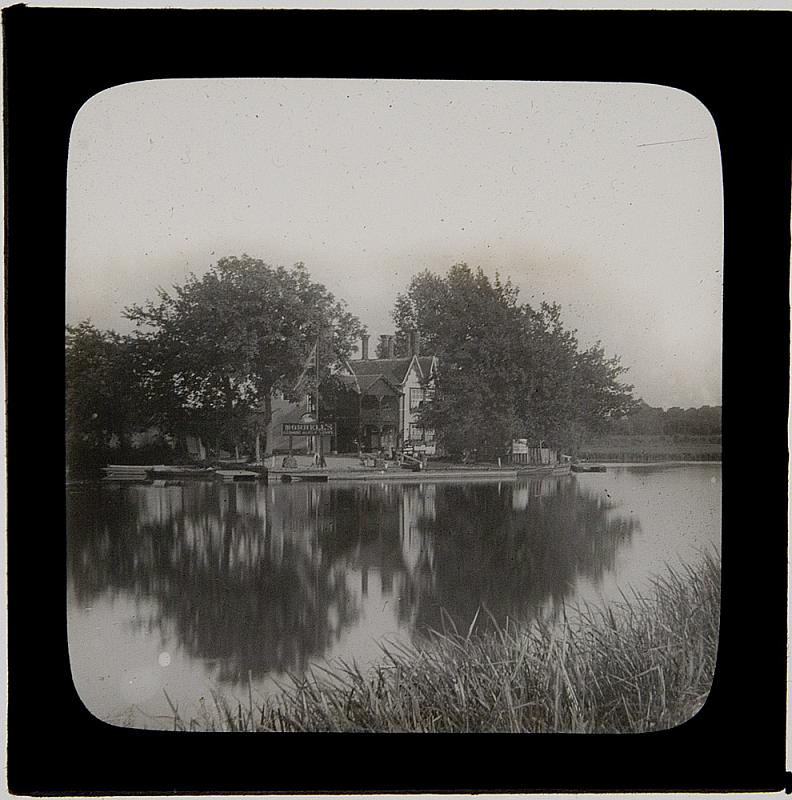
The former Swan Inn on Rose Isle

Rose Isle is an island in the River Thames in England just downstream of Kennington Railway Bridge on the reach above Sandford Lock, near Kennington, Oxfordshire.

The island is tree-covered and has a narrow channel behind it crossed by a footbridge. It was formerly used for the growing of osiers (basket willows, used for basketry, furniture, and cart-making). The house on the island replaces the Swan Hotel which was formerly a well-known stopping point on the river. The island was also known in the past as Kennington Island or St Michael's Island.

From a local government perspective, the island is in the civil parish of Sandford-on-Thames in the district of South Oxfordshire.

== History ==
Prior to the construction of the Swann Inn, Rose Isle served an agricultural purpose, being used for cultivation of osiers, which were harvested for furniture and baskets. Later in 1729, the Swann Inn, the island's main attraction, was built. It was known as a local community pub, commonly drawing in courting couples and picnicking families. Notably, in 1856, Lewis Carroll visited the island as part of a boating excursion across the river, of which he details a day out during the late afternoon picnicking with his siblings Harry and Ina, describing it as an experience he thoroughly enjoyed.

In 1883, Moorlands Brewery acquired the island, and in 1889 ownership changed to Morrell's Brewery, who had employed a ferryman to transport people across the river. The Swann Inn was leased as a hotel targeted at anglers in 1919, serving as this purpose for 9 years, until it was sold in 1928, and after 200 years of use, ceased being a public house officially in 1929. Currently the island is privately owned by the Reynolds family.

== See also ==
- Islands in the River Thames

Next island upstream	River Thames	Next island downstream
Osney Island	Rose Isle	Fiddler's Elbow
