= Blackbird Leys =

Civil parish and ward in Oxford, England

Coordinates: 51.721°N 1.201°W

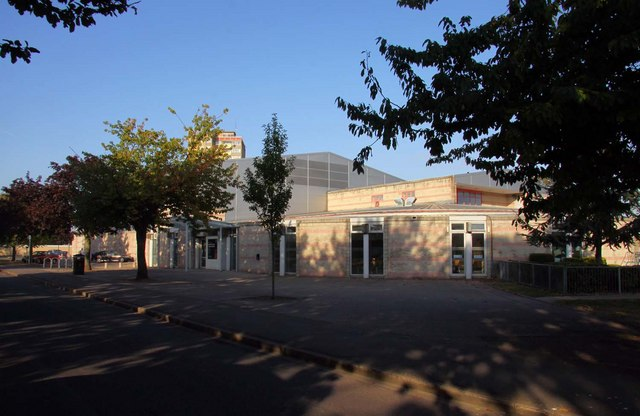
- Blackbird Leys Leisure Centre

- Location within Oxfordshire
- Area: 2.22 km^{2} (0.86 sq mi)
- Population: 13,100 (2011 census)
  - Density: 5,901/km^{2} (15,280/sq mi)
- OS grid reference: SP5502
- Civil parish: Blackbird Leys
- District: Oxford
- Shire county: Oxfordshire
- Region: South East
- Country: England
- Sovereign state: United Kingdom
- Post town: Oxford
- Postcode district: OX4
- Dialling code: 01865
- Police: Thames Valley
- Fire: Oxfordshire
- Ambulance: South Central
- UK Parliament: Oxford East
- Website: Blackbird Leys Parish Council

Blackbird Leys is a civil parish and ward in Oxford, England. According to the 2011 census, the population of the ward (whose boundaries may change occasionally so as to ensure minimal malapportionment) stood at 6,077. Unlike most parts of the City of Oxford, the area has a civil parish, which was created in 1990. In 2011 the population was recorded as 13,100.

== History ==
=== Early history ===
There was a Bronze Age or Iron Age settlement on the site. Evidence has been found suggesting pits and roundhouses, with remains of pottery and a cylindrical loom weight of a kind previously known only from East Anglia. The area was originally called Blackford Leys; blackford after the dark-coloured ford which crossed the southern branch of Northfield Brook at the entrance to Blackbird Leys farm. The ford would be located where Windale Avenue crosses Northfield Brook. (Note: In the early 1950s a gravel lane led from Sandy Lane to Blackbird Leys farm. This lane was lined, either side, with horse-chestnut trees and was known to local children as "Conker Alley".) The farm was also called Blackford Leys farm. The Middle English leys meaning pasture or meadow.

=== Modern history ===
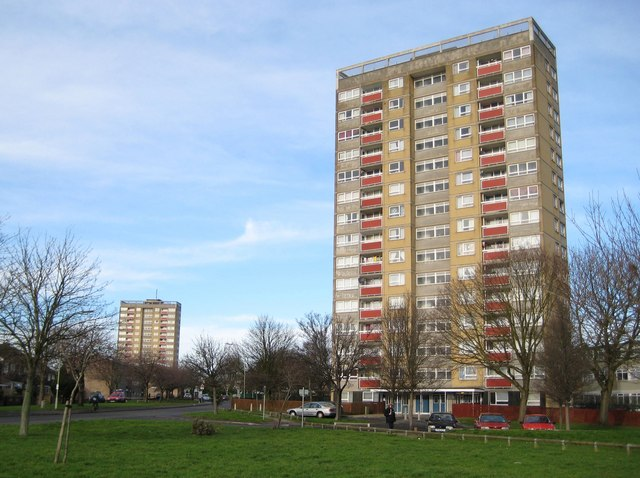
Evenlode Tower, with Windrush Tower in the background

The Blackbird Leys Estate was built mainly in the 1950s and 1960s to meet the then pressing need for housing. It was part of a plan to re-house people from the dilapidated inner city. This included large-scale clearance of a site near to where the Oxford Ice Rink was built (The Oxpens). Many of the families that moved onto the estate originally came from this area. It was also a convenient site for factory workers at the Morris Motors Limited plant in nearby Cowley.

==== Politics ====
The area has traditionally been staunchly Labour. The Independent Working Class Association performed strongly in the mid-2000s, holding three of the four council seats on Oxford City Council between 2006 and 2008. Andrew Smith, the local MP from 1987 to 2017, lives on the estate. His late wife, Valerie Smith, was also a city councillor and county councillor for the area and former Lord Mayor of Oxford.

In stark contrast to Oxford as a whole, which had a Remain result of 71% in the 2016 UK referendum on EU membership, Blackbird Leys and neighbouring estates voted narrowly to leave the European Union.

==== 1991 street disturbances ====
Around 1991, Blackbird Leys suffered from joy riding. Young men from the estate would steal cars and 'display' them (with a variety of high-speed stunts) to an audience gathered outside the estate shops (known locally as the 'Top Shops'). Following a crackdown by police on joyriding in September 1991, some 150 youths stoned police officers. Two women suffered stab wounds and two men suffered other injuries during the riots. Local MP, Andrew Smith, stated in 1991 that the extensive national media coverage of confrontations with the police in August and September left the wider public with a distorted picture of the problem. Some say journalists visiting helped encourage some of the action for filming.

Crime levels have decreased consistently since 2004, though both recorded crime and rates found in the British Crime Survey have fallen across England and Wales.

=== Sports and leisure ===
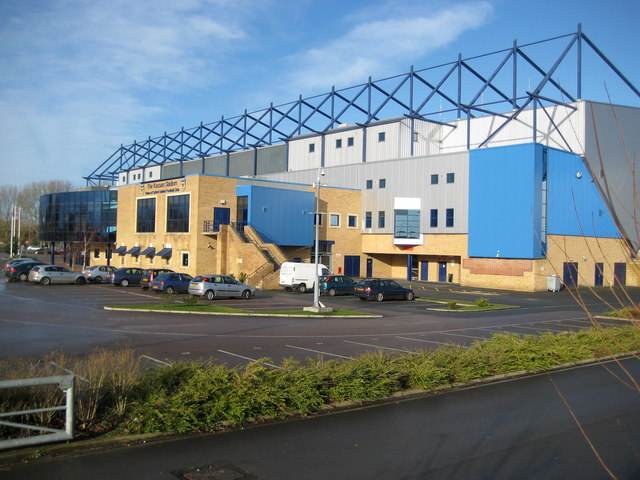
The Kassam Stadium, home to Oxford United Football Club

The Kassam Stadium is the home of Oxford United Football Club and is just within the greater boundary of Blackbird Leys in an area known as Minchery Farm. Initial construction began in 1996 and the first football match took place on 4 August 2001. It is also home of Oxford Speedway hosting Oxford Spires, Cheetahs and Chargers at the Oxford Stadium.

=== Musical groups ===
In 2006, residents from the estate took part in The Singing Estate, a Channel Five reality TV show following their progress from amateur singers to classical choir. The Blackbird Leys Choir emerged from the original choir and continues today.

== Education ==
Primary schools on the estate include Pegasus First School, Orchard Meadow Primary School and Windale Community Primary School in the Greater Leys area. The only Secondary school on the estate is The Oxford Academy. SEND schools are also present on the estate, these are Mabel Pritchard Special School and Orion Academy. City of Oxford College has a campus situated on Cuddesdon Way which provides further education, higher education, modern apprenticeships and community evening classes.

== Transport ==
Blackbird Leys has no mainline railway station but is served by Oxford Bus Company and Stagecoach in Oxfordshire which provides bus services between Blackbird Leys, central Oxford and Oxford railway station. The freight-only railway between Kennington Junction and the BMW Mini factory via Iffley and Littlemore forms the northwestern boundary of Blackbird Leys. It is part of the former Wycombe Railway that British Railways closed to passenger traffic in 1963.

== Religious sites ==
Blackbird Leys has two places of worship, The Church of the Holy Family which was dedicated on 10 April 1965 and Sacred Heart Catholic Church. A hymn tune by Peter Warwick Cutts 1937–2024 to the hymn 'Come, risen Lord, and deign to be our guest' (Hymns Ancient & Modern New Standard #349) is entitled 'Blackbird Leys'.

== Notable residents ==
- Hugh Laurie, actor, writer, musician, and comedian who was born and grew up in Blackbird Leys
- Alex O’Connor, atheist YouTuber and philosopher

== See also ==
- Banlieue
- Littlemore Brook, which flows from Blackbird Leys and through the Oxford Science Park to the south.
