= Chandlings =

Private school in Kennington, Oxford, England

Coordinates: 51.7075°N 1.268°W

Chandlings Prep School
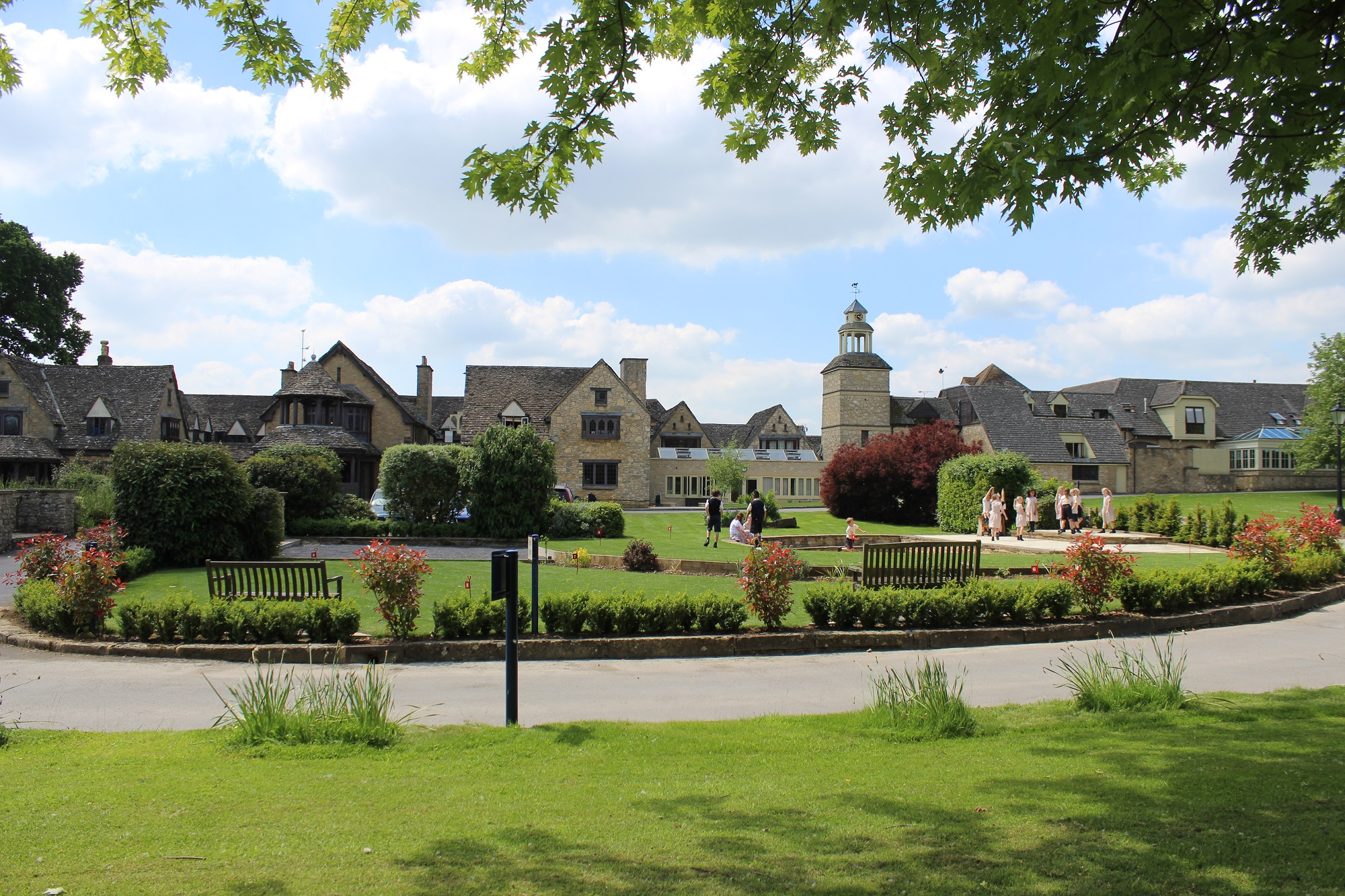

Location
- Bagley Wood; Kennington, Oxford, OX1 5ND; England

Information
- Type: Private preparatory day school
- Motto: We champion childhood by promoting curiosity, endeavor and adventure
- Established: 1994
- Department for Education URN: 131981 Tables
- Ofsted: Reports
- Headmaster: Adam Mallins
- Chair of Governors: Alison Derham
- Staff: 90
- Gender: Co-educational
- Age: 2 to 11
- Enrolment: approx. 400
- Houses: Astley; Poltimore; Richardson
- Colours: Blue; Red; Gold; Grey
- Website: www.chandlings.org.uk

Chandlings, or Chandlings Prep School, known until 2007 as Chandlings Manor School, is an independent co-educational preparatory school at Bagley Wood near Kennington, a village south of Oxford.

The school occupies a site of 62 acres (25 hectares), and is a member of the Independent Association of Prep Schools.

== History ==
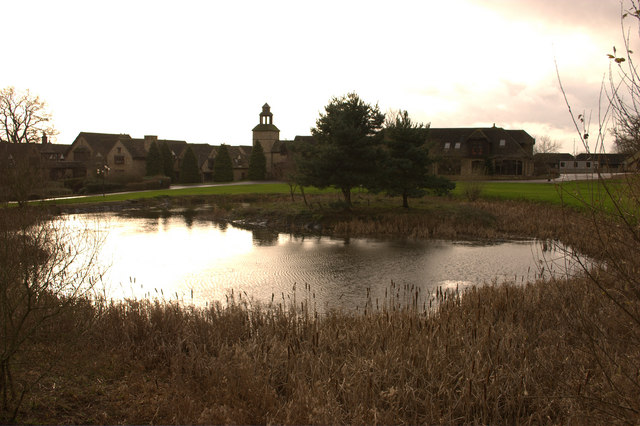
Chandlings in 2007

Chandlings was founded in 1994 as a co-educational day-school by the governors of Cothill House to supplement the preparatory boarding school education for boys at Cothill. In its early years, it was known as Chandlings Manor School.

== Present day ==
The school is operated by Radley Schools Group, an educational charity registered in England, which also operates other preparatory schools in England.

Chandlings is a co-educational school which has a nursery and a pre-prep department, which delivers an Early Years Foundation Stage programme for children up to year 2, and then a prep department, for years 3 to 6. Pupils are divided into three houses: Richardson (colour: red), Astley (dark blue) and Poltimore (green).

The headmaster is Adam Mallins.

The Good Schools Guide says:

The name conjures up ancient stones, mullioned windows, the faded grandeur of an ancient aristocratic line. The reality is more of a 62-acre Southfork Ranch/nouveau Cotswold mash-up with added fountains. Parents be reassured, these well-appointed low-rise buildings do, in fact, lend themselves very well to a school.

== Publications ==
- Clare Walsh, Get Cooking! (Chandlings Manor School, 2005, ISBN 0955006708)
