= Henry Colyear Dawkins =

British forester, botanist, ecologist and statistician (1921–1992)

Photograph of H.C. Dawkins

Henry Colyear Dawkins MBE (1921 – 4 May 1992) was a British forester, botanist, ecologist and statistician, a Fellow of St John's College, Oxford.

One of three brothers, he studied botany at Oxford, following in the footsteps of his elder brother John. From 1942 he worked as a District Forest Officer in the Colonial Service in Uganda in the Northern district of Acholi, where he set about learning the fundamentals of tropical forestry. He was awarded an MBE in the 1956 New Year Honours list for "services to Uganda". Later, he returned to Oxford as a lecturer, publishing several papers during his career. His 1958 paper on "The management of tropical high forest with special reference to Uganda" is considered a classic.

His book, Tropical Moist Siviculture and Management: A History of Success and Failure was completed after his death by Michael Philip and published in 1998.

He was the uncle of the evolutionary biologist Richard Dawkins and his nephew's 1995 book River Out of Eden is dedicated to him.

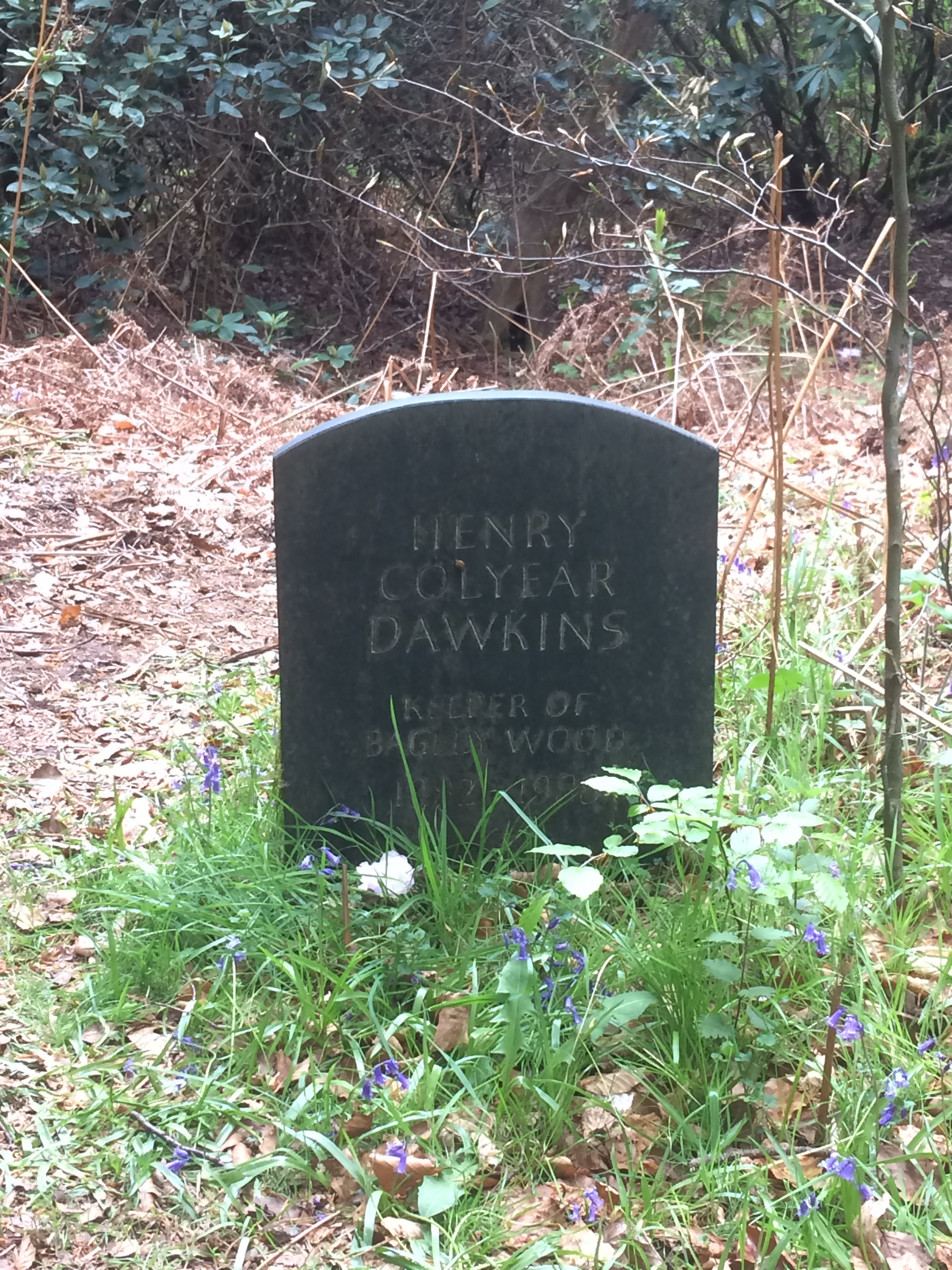
Memorial stone to Henry Colyear Dawkins, Keeper of Bagley Wood
