= Sandford-on-Thames =

Village in Oxfordshire, England

Coordinates: 51.713°N 01.232°W

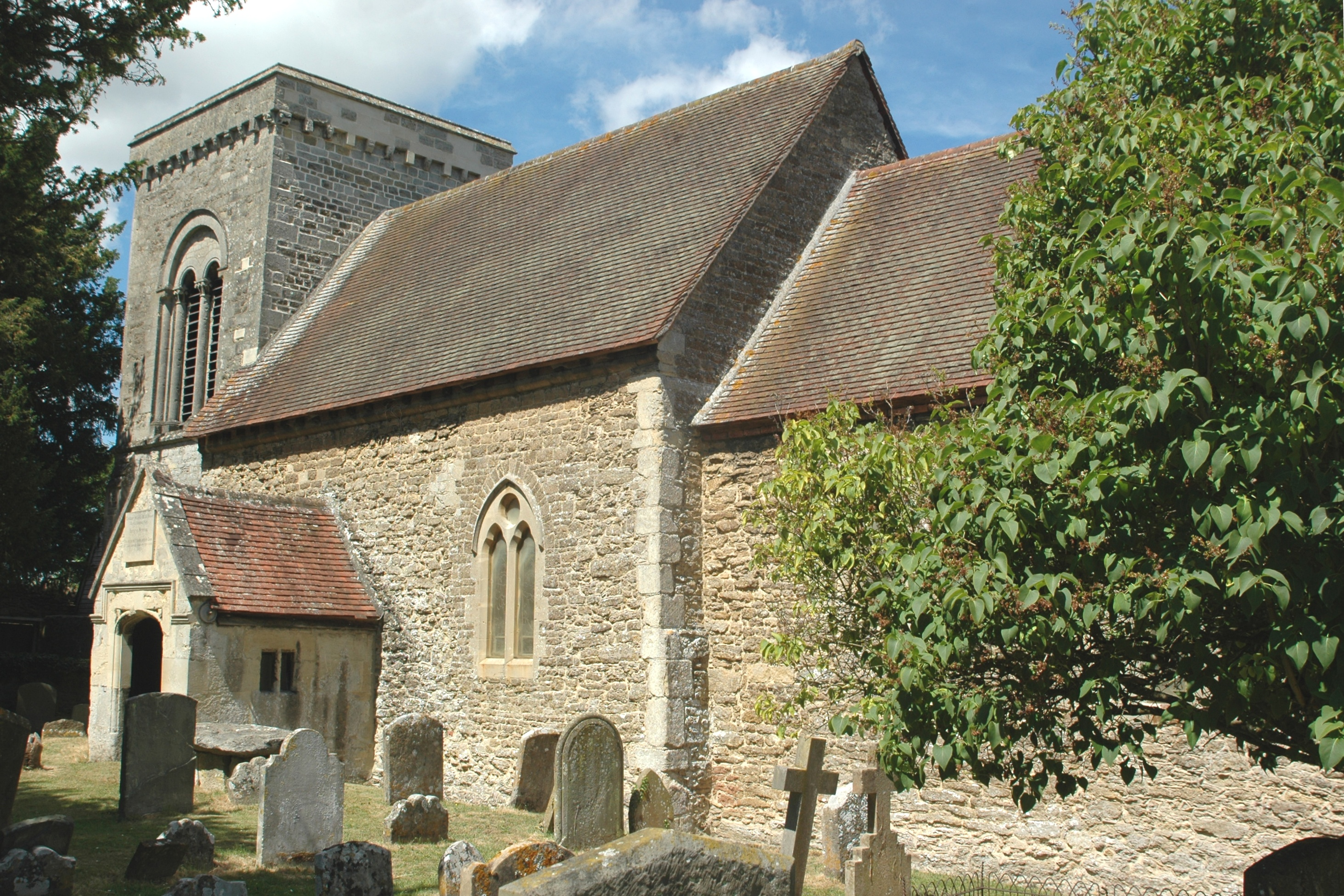
- St. Andrew's parish church

- Location within Oxfordshire
- Area: 3.78 km^{2} (1.46 sq mi)
- Population: 1,336 (2001 census)
  - Density: 353/km^{2} (910/sq mi)
- OS grid reference: SP5301
- Civil parish: Sandford-on-Thames
- District: South Oxfordshire
- Shire county: Oxfordshire
- Region: South East
- Country: England
- Sovereign state: United Kingdom
- Post town: Oxford
- Postcode district: OX4
- Dialling code: 01865
- Police: Thames Valley
- Fire: Oxfordshire
- Ambulance: South Central
- UK Parliament: Didcot and Wantage
- Website: Sandford-on-Thames Village Magazine

Sandford-on-Thames, also referred to as simply Sandford, is a village and civil parish in the South Oxfordshire district, in Oxfordshire, England, beside the River Thames, just south of Oxford. The village is just west of the A4074 road between Oxford and Henley. In 2001 the parish had a population of 1336.

== Early history ==
In 1086 the Domesday Book counted 18 families as living by the sandy ford over the Thames between Iffley and Radley. Six hundred years later the population of the village had barely doubled, and it was still under 200 people at the start of the 19th century. Today the population numbers more than 1,000 and the parish boundaries have undergone considerable revision.

== Parish church of Saint Andrew ==
In the middle of the 12th century a small "field church" dedicated to Saint Andrew was built on a hill in the Sandford manorial grounds for the use of the nearby Minchery nuns. The original Norman porch was restored and repaired in 1652 through the generosity of Elizabeth Isham but the majority of the improvement works to the church took place in the 25 years between 1840 and 1865. In the centre of the graveyard stands a fine yew tree planted on Good Friday 1800 and just to the east of the porch is a flat-topped gravestone from which bread was handed out to the poor of the parish. Four war memorials are on the south wall in St Andrew's church: a wooden village shrine which lists the fallen of both World Wars, and three individual commemorative plaques to E.G. Wilkins, H.S. Cannon and H.C. Cannon. Each has been recorded and included in the National Inventory of War Memorials at the Imperial War Museum.

== Knights Templar and Knights Hospitaller ==
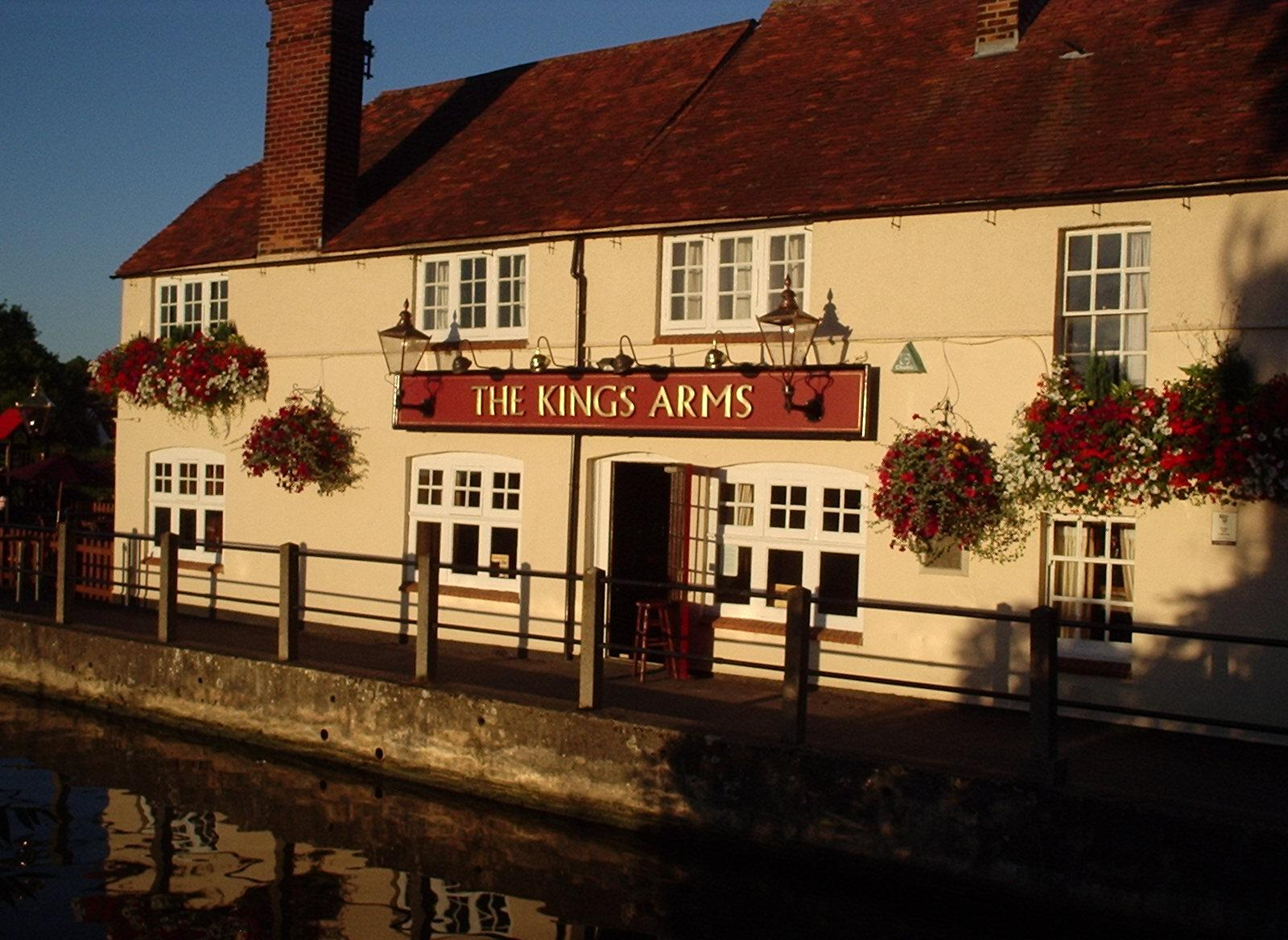
The King's Arms

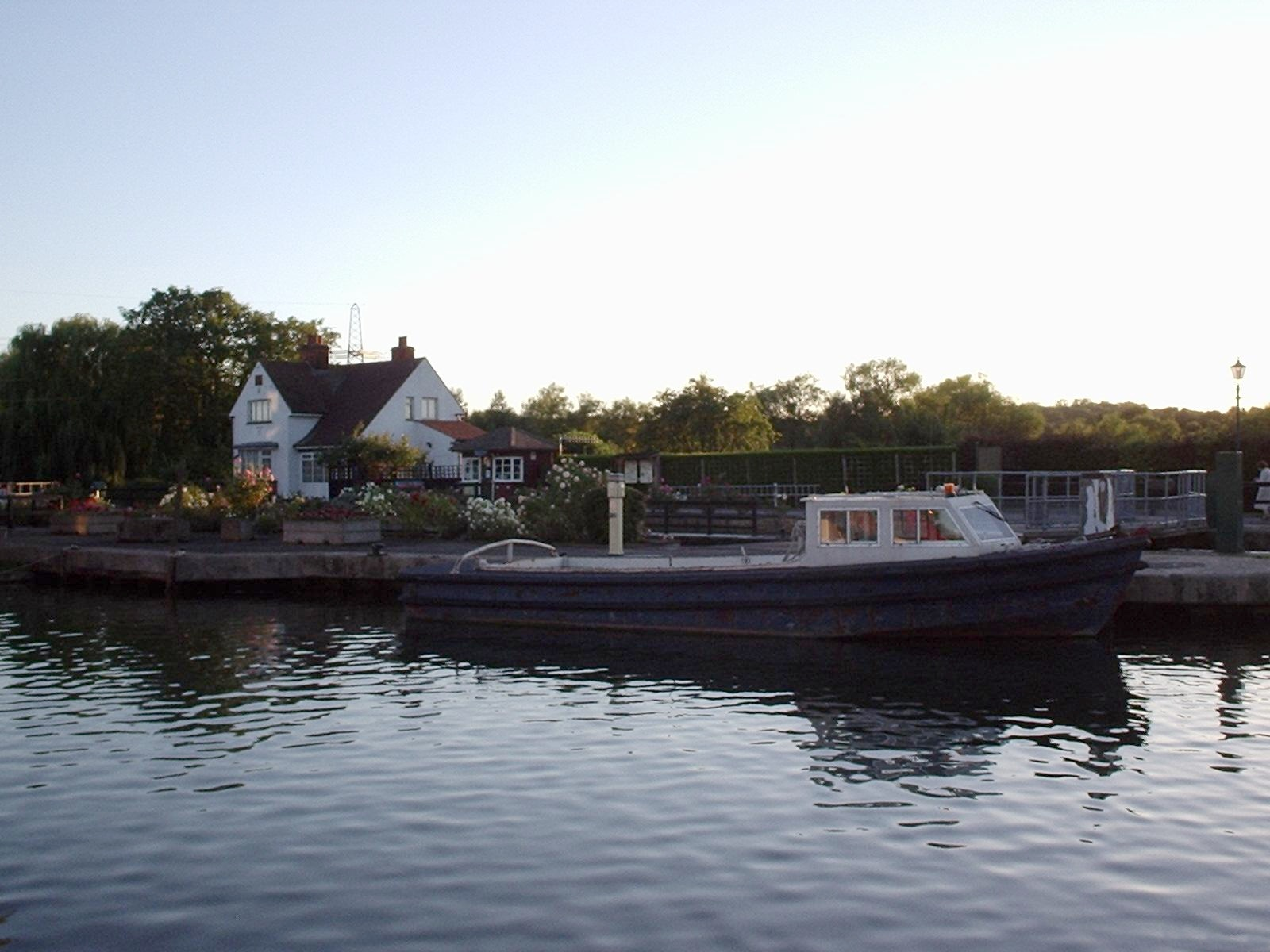
River Thames at Sandford Lock

In 1239 Sir Thomas de Sandford gave land to the Knights Templar enclave in Oxford's Temple Cowley. In the reign of Edward II the Templars were suppressed and in 1324 the Knights Hospitaller took over. In 1541 Henry VIII dissolved the order, and the land passed to Cardinal Sir Thomas Wolsey.

== River and lock ==
The river Thames dominates Sandford's history, with the fertile meadows promoting agriculture and the water providing both transport and power. Roman pottery from kilns found on the northern edge of the village hints at Sandford's manufacturing heritage. The toponym "Sandford" suggests a river crossing, and there are references to Sandford Ferry throughout history. In May 1644, during the English Civil War, the Earl of Essex took his troops across the river at Sandford to join the battle of Cropredy. Within living memory there was still a ferry (later a toll bridge) at the King's Arms public house by the river taking traffic, including horses and carts, over the river to Abingdon, once the county town of Berkshire. An ancient mounting block can still be seen on the western river bank just below the lock, which travellers would have used to remount their horses having crossed the river on foot.

In his book Three Men in a Boat, Jerome K. Jerome described the pool under Sandford lasher as "a very good place to drown yourself in". The watercourse behind the lock-keeper's house (dated 1914) flows from the "big lasher" weir which creates strong currents and eddies. In spite of the danger, this was a favourite swimming place up to the mid-20th century. In 1921 the river here claimed the lives of three Christ Church students, including Michael Llewelyn Davies, the adopted son of J. M. Barrie, who was the inspiration for Peter Pan. An obelisk that has stood here since at least 1821 records the deaths of six Christ Church students who drowned here in three separate incidents between 1843 and 1921. Even into the 1950s the river at Sandford-on-Thames was still regarded as a place to come and relax. On Sundays people came from Oxford to swim at The Lido below the lock and to picnic. The King's Arms had extensive tea-lawns on which to spend lazy Sunday afternoons.

The first lock at Sandford was the navigation weir or flash lock situated on the old river channel at the site of the lasher today. This was described in 1624 as "Great Lockes" and was replaced in about 1632 by one of the first pound locks to be built in England. Iffley, Sandford and Culham locks were built by the Oxford-Burcot Commission following the Thames Navigation Act 1623 (21 Jas. 1. c. 32). The old lock has since been filled in but its position can still be seen (the position of the upper gates can be seen in the stonework above the present upper gates). A new lock on the present site was opened in 1836 which lasted until the most recent improvements when the present lock was built in 1972. Littlemore Brook joins the River Thames near Sandford-on-Thames.

== Farms ==
The Knights Templar name lived on until recently in Temple Farm, which was acquired by Magdalen College, Oxford in 1900. In the 1950s Gilbert Henry James Morris (known as Dick Morris) entered into a long lease with Magdalen College and together with his wife Freda founded the Temple Farm Country Club. The land encompassed several buildings including the main house which held the bar for members, and two floors of bedrooms where Mr. and Mrs. Morris resided and also included guest rooms. The barn also had a bar (the barn bar) and a large function room which hosted Sunday dinners and occasional evening events including weekly bingo and seasonal dances. The New Year's Eve dance was a particular highlight. There was also a caravan park, a cricket pitch and a marina on the Thames river. After Dick Morris' death in 1966, his wife Freda continued on in partnership with her son Lloyd and together they ran the club until 1985 when the lease expired. After the long incarnation as Temple Farm Country Club the property burnt down in the 1990s and was restored as a hotel, originally part of the Four Pillars Hotels Group and from 2016 part of the De Vere Hotel group. The barn bar was said to be the final resting place of the Oxford Martyr George Napier, whose remains were taken from the Thames and laid to rest in the family chapel that later became the barn bar. The inscription 1614 was carved onto the gateway of the garden through which the torchlight procession carrying his remains was carried en route to burial.

Rock Farm, formerly called Sandford Farm, was bought by a Mr. Benfield in 1897. He and his partner Mr Loxley were owners of a building firm and developed the clay on Rock Farm to supply their building works with bricks. Apart from the road name, the last remnants of Rock Farm are the original farmhouse, now called Manor House and originally called Sandford Farm, with its tied cottages running down the left side of Rock Farm Lane, another row of four to the right of Manor house and the old dovecote in Keene Close which was restored in the 1990s and stands in front of one of the houses in the recent Rock Farm development. The new barn style house in Rock Farm Lane stands on the floor plan of the original ancient barn which the developer of the site got permission to demolish. During the ground preparation for the new houses at Rock farm a large quantity of building stone was unearthed. some of which was dressed for windows and other architectural features. This may have been from Elizabeth Isham's house which was believed to have been near there. Some of the stone was incorporated into the reconstructed building at the back of Manor house which was the south end of the old milking parlor. Roman pottery shards and some firing slag was also found at the end of what is now Keene close. (Mr Gerald Keene was the last farmer to operate the farm at this site.)

== Industry ==
Next to and downstream from the lock is a waterfront housing development, Sandford Mill. Built in the 1980s, this occupies the site of the former mill which closed on Christmas Eve 1982. Originally a corn mill belonging to the Abbey of Abingdon and recorded in 1100 as owned by the local monks for bread making, it came into the hands of the Knights Templars at the beginning of the 14th century. It was converted to a paper mill in 1826 in order to supply the increasing demands of the University of Oxford. The listed cottages upstream from the lock (now River View) that can be seen across the road from the old wharf were also built in 1826. Occupied by mill workers, they originally boasted flat roofs made of tarred paper, (a first in Britain). The millrace continues to flow under the footbridge that crosses from the King's Arms pub to the lock.

At the beginning of the 20th century the wharf adjacent to and upstream from the King's Arms was used extensively both by the paper mill and also by the brickworks, which developed well until 1914 when the lime content in the clay was so great it spoiled the bricks. The engines were sold to new owners in Aylesbury, Folkestone and Winchester. Each engine and trucks were delivered by an employee of the brickworks, a Mr Mills (the 2nd brickworks manager). In 1920 the 126 foot tall brickworks chimney was demolished. The land is now a trailer park site. The name is preserved in Brick Kiln Lane (formerly Crab or Crab Gate Lane) running east out of the village towards the Oxford Science Park and Oxford United FC's Kassam Stadium which was completed in 2001.

In 2017, Sandford Hydro, a run-of-river hydroelectric scheme, was commissioned on the opposite bank of the river in Kennington, using the head of water provided by the weir at Sandford Lock. Owned and operated by Low Carbon Hub Sandford Hydro Ltd, a subsidiary of Low Carbon Hub, it is described as the largest community-owned hydroelectric scheme on the Thames. In 2025, solar photovoltaic panels were installed across the site to generate electricity during periods of low river flow.

== Henley Road ==
The road through the centre of the village (now the Henley Road but formerly called both the Nuneham Road and the London Road) also crosses the Northfield Brook. A toll house known as Sandford Gate stood here until it was knocked down in 1920 and the present house was built. One of the earliest petrol stations, which served William Morris (Lord Nuffield) as he journeyed between Oxford and Nuffield was on the Henley Road opposite the present garage. The garage served as a Spitfire wing repair shop in the Second World War.

== The Second Wartime Boat Race, 1943 ==
In 1943, the second wartime Boat Race between the Universities of Oxford and Cambridge was held on the Thames at Sandford. Like the first, it was unofficial and no Blues were awarded. However, public enthusiasm was high and the river banks were thronged with spectators, all of whom had to reach the course either by bicycle or on foot. Contemporary newspaper reports estimate the crowd at between seven and ten thousand. The Cambridge crew, unusually for the time, included a Dane at bow and a Turk at number four. The Oxford crew included four medical students. The race was rowed between the narrow banks of a 1.25 miles (2.01 km) downstream course with the start about 0.25 miles (400 m) below Sandford Lock and the finish at the Radley College Boathouse. Oxford won the toss and chose the Oxfordshire bank, with Cambridge rowing on the Berkshire side. Oxford set off at 40 strokes compared to Cambridge's 37, and were almost immediately in the lead and a length up in some thirty seconds. Despite being left at the start, Cambridge did not give up and responded well, with the judge's verdict at the finish recorded as a win for Oxford by just two-thirds of a length.

== Amenities ==
The village has two public houses: the King's Arms on the river (converted in the 19th century from the Mill malthouse), and The Catherine Wheel on Henley Road. The Fox (built in 1853 by the Morrell family) has been closed since 2009. The village has several public open spaces including a large, fenced recreation ground next to the church containing children's play equipment, a grassed area on the riverside near Sandford Lock which is the site of the old wharf, and recreation areas off Heyford Hill Lane which also contain children's play equipment. All are maintained by the Parish Council. The Oxford Preservation Trust owns the land between Broadhurst Gardens and the River Thames. The village shop and post office was closed in 1987. The Village Hall has a shop and cafe run by volunteers, called 'Talking Shop' which offers local foods as well as general provisions. The Sustrans cycle path is accessible from the village across the river Thames and offers easy access to Oxford city centre along the river. Sandford is a scheduled stop for Salters Steamers' river boat services between Oxford and Abingdon. A regular local bus service between Wallingford and Oxford city centre serves the village.

== Street names ==
Despite extensive local research by the Parish Council and local residents, no suitable ancient field names could be found that could be adapted for the new roads created at Heyford Hill Lane in the late 1990s. Consequently, surnames of past local residents were proposed, and they were accepted by South Oxfordshire District Council. The names adopted are:

- Batten Place: Richard Batten was the first Attendant at Littlemore Hospital, which opened in 1846.
- Buckler Place: J.C. Buckler was one of the original architects of Littlemore Hospital.
- Janaway: when the Sandford Link Road was built to pass underneath the Henley Road at the junction with Heyford Hill Lane, a property called Dool House had to be demolished. This large house, which stood at the end of Heyford Hill Lane, was built in 1810 by John Janaway, a wheelwright. The house was purchased by the newly opened Littlemore Hospital in 1848 to house the Hospital Chaplain. It later became a home for nurses and a residence for doctors.

== People from Sandford-on-Thames ==
- William Stroudley, locomotive superintendent of the Highland Railway and later the London, Brighton and South Coast Railway, was born at Sandford-on-Thames on 6 March 1833.
- Charlie Walters, footballer, who played for Tottenham Hotspur F.C. and won a winners' medal in the 1921 FA Cup Final.

== Sources ==
- Arnatt; Crickmay; Newbigging (1996). The Changing Faces of Littlemore & Sandford. Witney: Robert Boyd Publications. ISBN 978-1-899536-06-1.
- Lobel, Mary D, ed. (1957). Victoria County History: A History of the County of Oxford: Volume 5: Bullingdon Hundred. pp. 267–275.
- Sherwood, Jennifer; Pevsner, Nikolaus (1974). The Buildings of England: Oxfordshire. Harmondsworth: Penguin Books. pp. 689, 749–750. ISBN 0-14-071045-0.
