= Blackbird Leys Choir =

- Choir
- Former name: Ivor's Choir
- Founded: 2006
- Founder: Ivor Setterfield
- Website: blackbirdleyschoir.org

The Blackbird Leys Choir formed in January 2006 as Ivor's Choir for a constructed documentary series, The Singing Estate under Ivor Setterfield. Original members all live or work on or around the Blackbird Leys estate in Oxford, England, and the series focused on their quest to become a classical choir in just three months.

After performances in Oxford, Italy, and at the Royal Albert Hall in London, the choir's future was uncertain for a while, but core members remained keen after filming ended, and in summer 2006 it was confirmed that there was funding for performances in February 2007. Choirmaster Andrew Stewart took over, and rehearsals began in September 2006.

On 19 December 2006, twenty members of the choir performed Handel's Hallelujah chorus in private performance at Buckingham Palace for Queen Elizabeth II, the Duke of Edinburgh, and others; they also sang carols for guests at the 'Achievers of the Year' reception. On 14 January 2007, the choir reunited with Ivor Setterfield for Oxford Sings, with other singers from around the city and county, to sing the Hallelujah chorus in a one-day workshop. This performance was recorded for broadcast on BBC local radio, and filmed for inclusion in a 'one year on' documentary by the makers of The Singing Estate.

On 14 February 2007, the choir performed with Oxford Philomusica at 'A Night at the Movies' at the local BMW factory, and on 24 February 2007 at Oxford's Sheldonian Theatre with the Oxford Philomusica and two guest solo singers. In 2008, they performed again at the Sheldonian Theatre, with Julian Lloyd Webber and the Oxford Philomusica. In 2009, the choir performed a number of public concerts, and in August visited Oxford's twin town, Leiden, for a series of small concerts as part of the Rapenburg music festival. In 2016, a tenth-anniversary concert was held.
