= Sandford Lock =

Lock in Oxfordshire, South East England, England

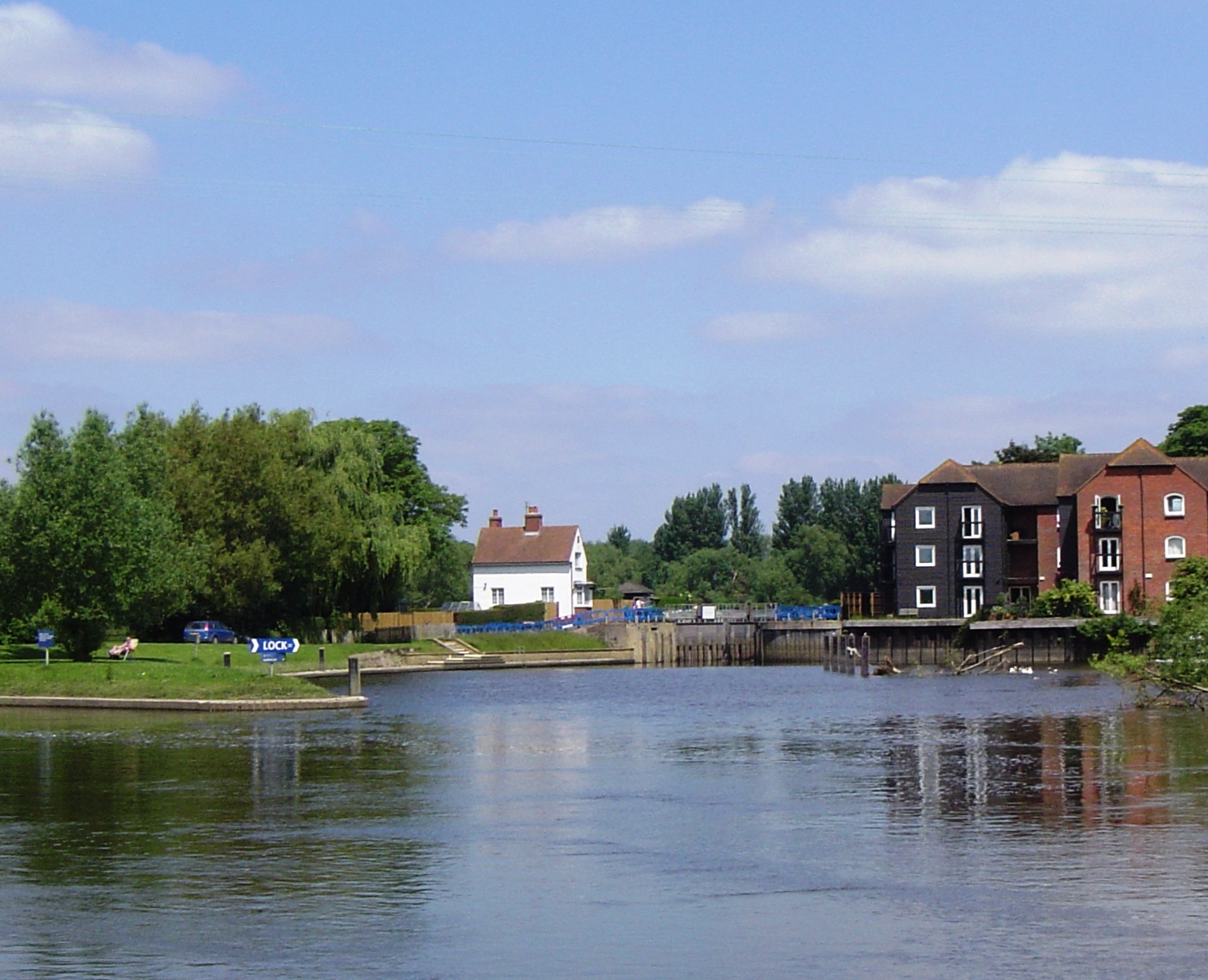
- Approaching Sandford Lock from downstream
- Interactive map of Sandford Lock
- 51.708048°N 1.233104°W
- Waterway: River Thames
- County: Oxfordshire
- Maintained by: Environment Agency
- Operation: Hydraulic
- First built: 1631
- Latest built: 1973
- Length: 53.03 m (174 ft 0 in)
- Width: 6.62 m (21 ft 9 in)
- Fall: 2.69 m (8 ft 10 in)
- Above sea level: 176'
- Distance to Teddington Lock: 89 miles
- Power is available out of hours

Sandford Lock is a lock on the River Thames in England, situated at Sandford-on-Thames which is just south of Oxford. The first pound lock was built in 1631 by the Oxford-Burcot Commission although this has since been rebuilt. The lock has the deepest fall of all locks on the Thames at 8 ft 9in (2.69m) and is connected to a large island which is one of three at this point. The lock lies at the end of Church Lane in Sandford on Thames.

Upstream from the lock, the main weir connects the second island to the opposite bank on the Kennington, Oxfordshire side. This is the location of the infamous Sandford Lasher, a treacherous weirpool where many have drowned. Another weir links the two lower islands.

== History ==
There was a mill here built by the Knights Templar in around 1294. There are also records of a ferry and a fish weir in medieval times. In the reign of Edward III there is an account of the immemorial conflict between millers and bargemen when "the men of Oxon broke down the locks of Sandford". This was probably at the navigation weir or flash lock on the old river channel behind the second island. This was described in 1624 as ‘Great Lockes’. It was replaced in 1631 when the Oxford-Burcot Commission built one of the first pound locks in England here. The lock was passed on to the Thames Navigation Commission in 1790 and lengthened in 1795, under the direction of Daniel Harris, the Oxford gaoler, at a cost of nearly £1,800. In 1836 a new lock was built on the current site alongside the old one and a lock house was ordered in 1839. The old lock has since been filled in after an incident when a miller opened the sluices and caused damage to the embankments. Its position is still visible (the position of the upper gates can be seen in the stonework above the present upper gates). An iron bridge above the lock was built between 1866 and 1877. The latest rebuild of the lock was in 1972.

== Sandford Lasher ==
A newspaper report of the 1921 drowning incident

Sandford Lasher, or weir, is on the left bank well upstream of Sandford Lock. The pool below the weir has been notorious since the 19th century because of the number of individuals who have drowned there. Weirs, like the one at Sandford Lasher, generate powerful circulating currents that can hold a victim (and often attempted rescuers) underwater at the base of the structure; hence their reputation as "drowning machines".

Henry Fawcett, a student of University College, Oxford, drowned while swimming in May 1833. In February 1840, John Richardson Currer, brother of Charles Savile Roundell and student of Balliol College, Oxford drowned in a boating accident, he was with Stephen Cave when their boat was swamped. Cave got to safety while Currier was swept into the lasher pool and drowned.

In November 1852, William Howe, a Commoner at Jesus College drowned at Sandford. He and two other students of the same college were boating near the lasher when their boat overturned and filled with water. Howe was carried into the lasher, possibly already unconscious, while his companions managed to swim to the river bank. A 16-year-old pupil of the Cowley Diocesan School, Edward John Templar, the son of the Vicar of Great Coxwell, drowned on 21 May 1864 after diving into the water and saving the life of another boy, a non-swimmer who had accidentally fallen into the weirpool. Clarence Sinclair Collier, a 19-year-old student of Balliol College, drowned in June 1879. He and another student were boating above the weir, but the boat overturned and both they and the boat were carried by the current over the weir and into the lasher pool, where Collier drowned. He is commemorated by a memorial on the wall of the antechapel at Balliol College.

At the weir, a 19th-century obelisk records the deaths of five Christ Church students who drowned here - Richard Phillimore and William Gaisford in 1843; George Dasent in 1872 and Michael Llewelyn Davies and Rupert Buxton in 1921. William Gaisford was the son of Thomas Gaisford, the dean of Christ Church. He got into difficulties while swimming on 23 June 1843. His friend, Richard Phillimore, entered the water to save him, but both young men drowned. Richard Phillimore was the son of Dr Joseph Phillimore, the Regius Professor of Civil Law. They are buried in Christ Church Cathedral and also commemorated by two memorial tablets in the north walk of the Cathedral cloisters.

Michael Llewelyn Davies was the foster son of writer J. M. Barrie, and one of the main inspirations for the character of Peter Pan. He and Rupert Buxton, the son of Sir Thomas Buxton, 4th Baronet, both drowned on 19 May 1921 in the Sandford Lasher in reportedly calm water. Buxton had recently celebrated his 21st birthday and Llewelyn Davies was just short of his 21st birthday.

The Sandford Lasher Weir is being used again to generate hydroelectric power making the memorial obelisk inaccessible. It may be viewed from various points around Sanford Pool, easily accessible from the Kennington side of the River Thames.

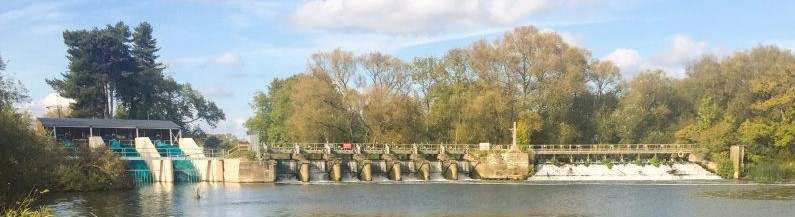
Sandford Weir in 2018, showing the hydroelectric equipment installed there. The Victorian obelisk is visible at centre-right.

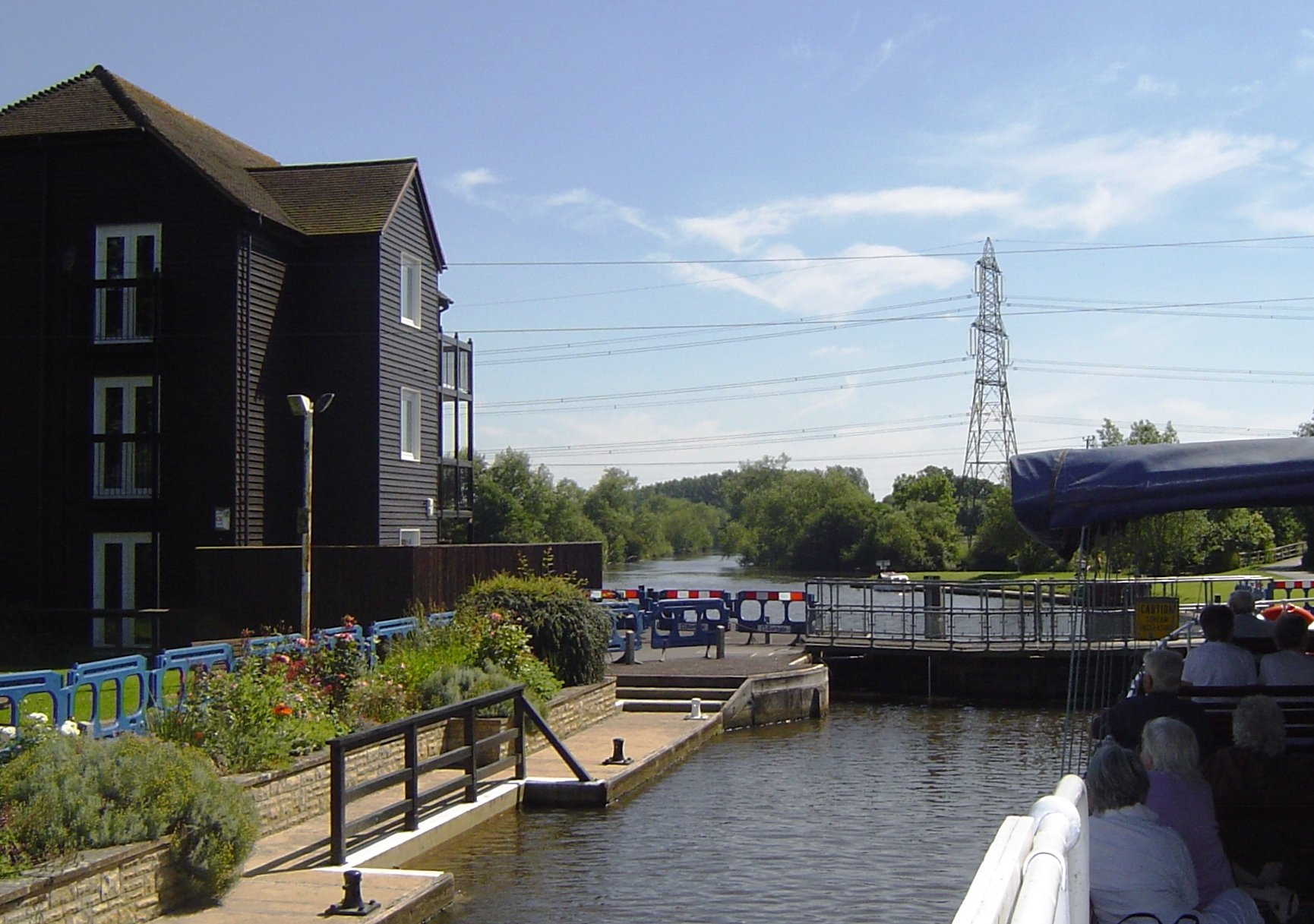
Sandford Lock full, looking downstream

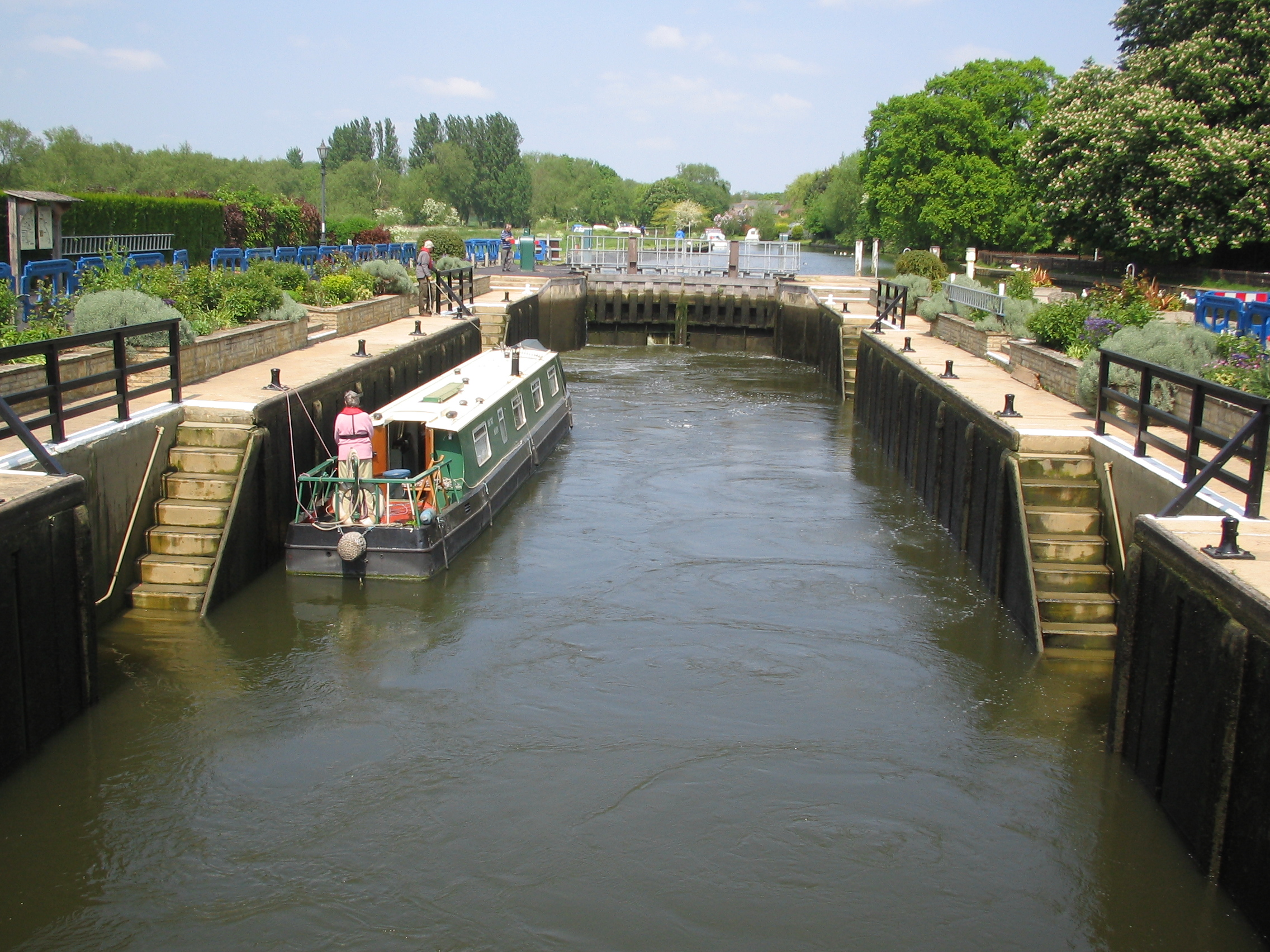
Sandford Lock empty from the tail gates

== Reach above the lock ==
After the third island which is Fiddler's Elbow the river makes a sharp turn at Rose Isle. On the west bank is the town of Kennington, Oxfordshire. Further upstream are Kennington Railway Bridge where the Hinksey Stream joins the Thames again and Isis Bridge carrying the Oxford southern by-pass.

The Thames Path follows the western bank to Iffley Lock crossing the Hinksey Stream on the Kennington Towpath bridge.

== Hydroelectric power ==
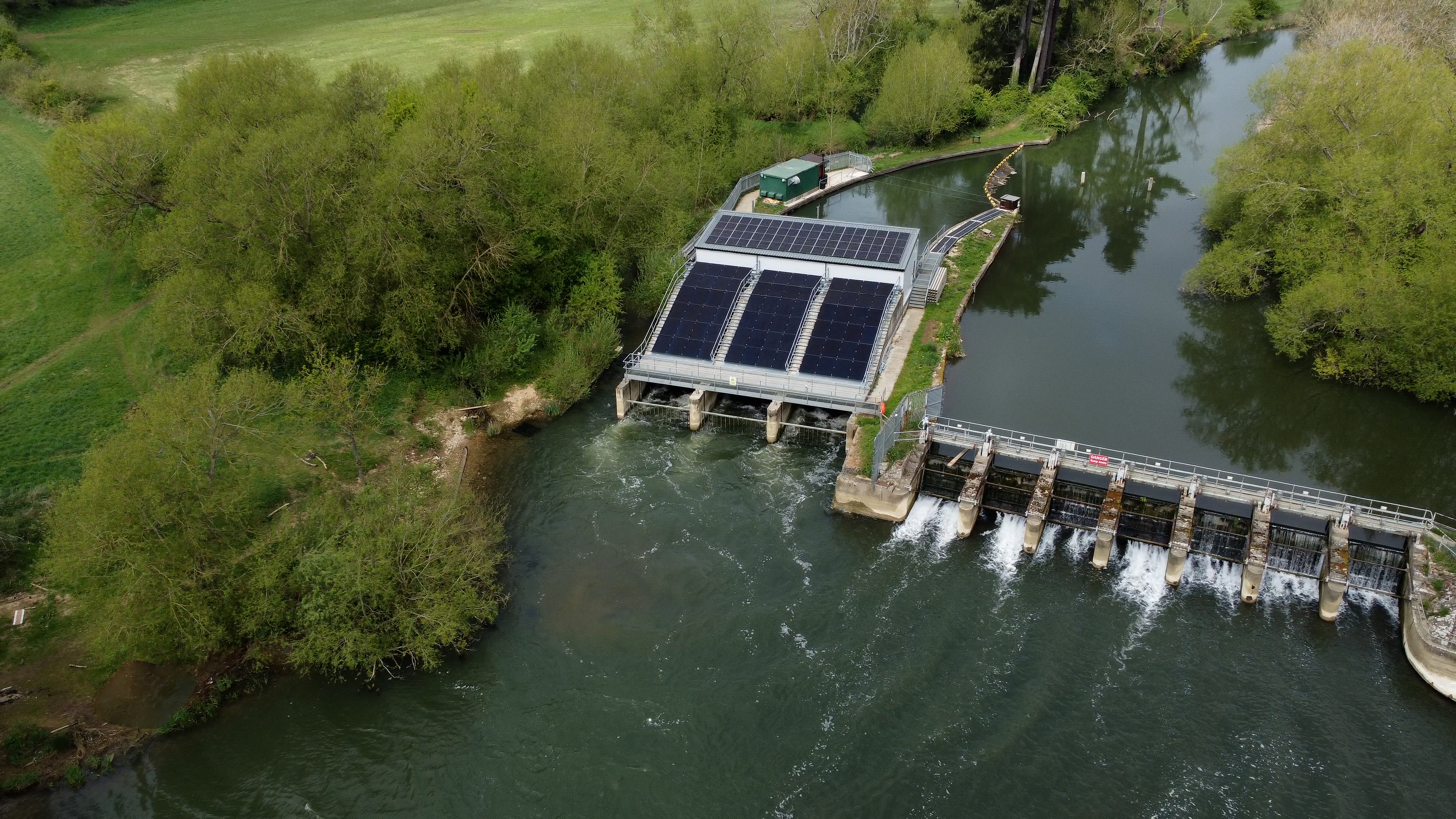
Sandford Hydro with solar PV canopy installed in 2025, Sandford-on-Thames, Oxfordshire

Construction of Sandford Hydro, a community-owned hydroelectric power scheme, began in 2013, with the three Archimedes screws generating electricity from May 2015. The scheme is owned and operated by Low Carbon Hub Sandford Hydro Ltd, operated by Low Carbon Hub, and is described as the largest community-owned hydroelectric scheme on the Thames, generating an average of 188 MWh of electricity per year — enough to power around 60 homes. In 2025, solar photovoltaic panels were installed across the site to supplement generation during periods of low river flow.

== Literature and the media ==
Sandford Lasher and its dangers are described in chapter 18 of Jerome K Jerome's Three Men in a Boat (1889).

The pool under Sandford lasher, just behind the lock, is a very good place to drown yourself in. The undercurrent is terribly strong, and if you once get down into it you are all right. An obelisk marks the spot where two men have already been drowned, while bathing there; and the steps of the obelisk are generally used as a diving-board by young men now who wish to see if the place really IS dangerous.

Jerome was a close personal friend of J.M. Barrie, and so probably knew Michael Llewelyn Davies.

It is also mentioned in The Dictionary of the Thames by Charles Dickens, Jr.

It is notorious to all rowing men and habitue's of the river that Sandford Lasher has almost yearly demanded its tale of victims and it is almost inconceivable that people will continue year after year to tempt fate in this and other equally dangerous places

In Tom Brown at Oxford, by Thomas Hughes, first published in 1861, the eponymous, principal character has a narrow escape after accidentally rowing a skiff over the weir and into the lasher. Sandford Lock is briefly mentioned in The Four Feathers by A.E.W. Mason (1902). It is also briefly mentioned in the poem The Burden of Itys by Oscar Wilde.

== See also ==
- Locks on the River Thames
- Crossings of the River Thames

Next crossing upstream	River Thames	Next crossing downstream
Kennington Railway Bridge	Sandford Lock	Nuneham Railway Bridge
Next lock upstream	River Thames	Next lock downstream
Iffley Lock; 2.70 km (1.68 mi)	Sandford Lock; Grid reference: SP531013	Abingdon Lock; 7.38 km (4.59 mi)
