= Setterfield =

Setterfield is a surname. Notable people with the surname include:

- Diane Setterfield (born 1964), English writer
- Ivor Setterfield, British conductor and singer
- Valda Setterfield (1934–2023), English dancer and actress
