= Fiddler's Elbow =

Island in the River Thames, England

Coordinates: 51.7125°N 1.2355°W

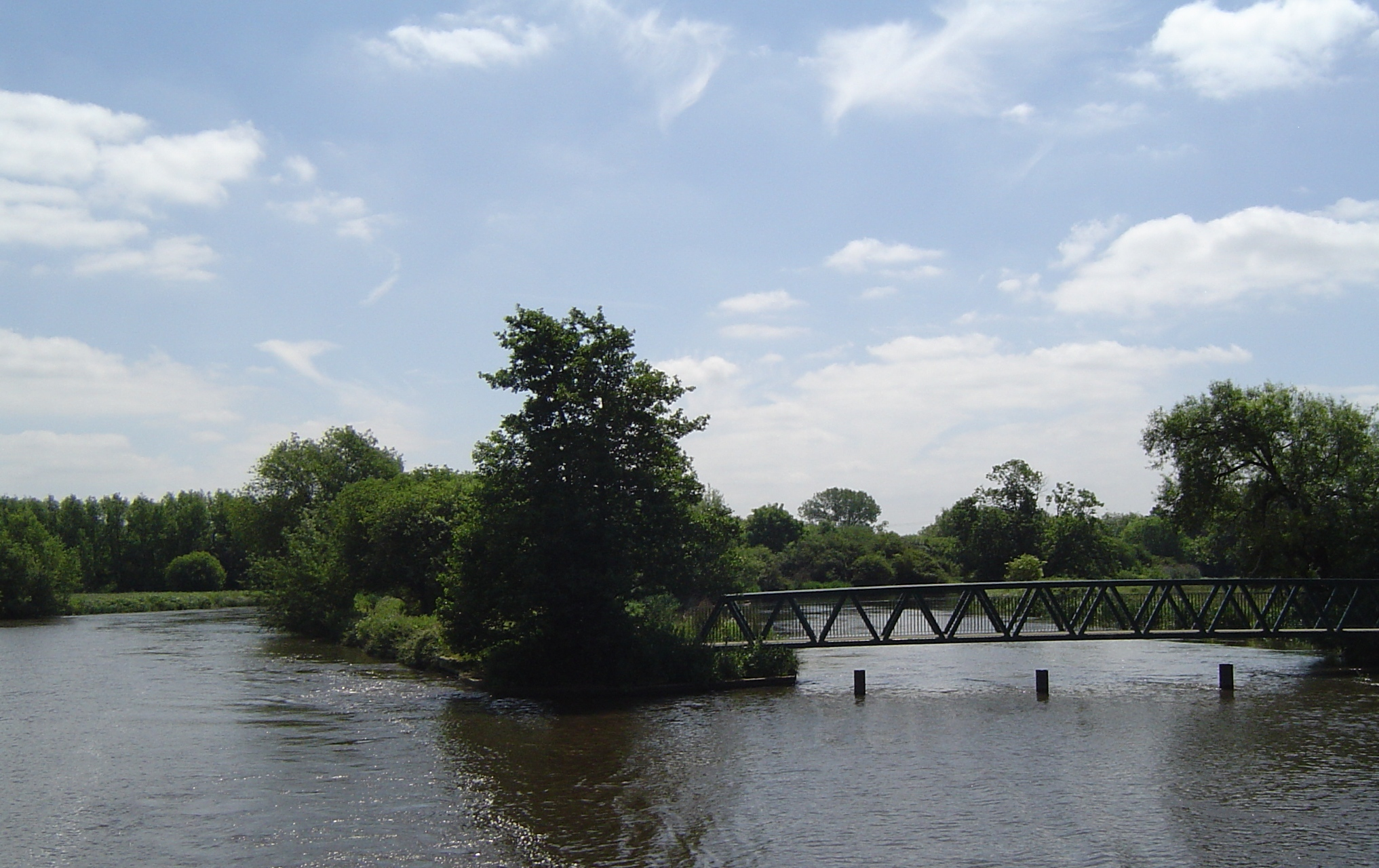
Sharp end of Fiddler's Elbow from upstream, with the weir stream to the right

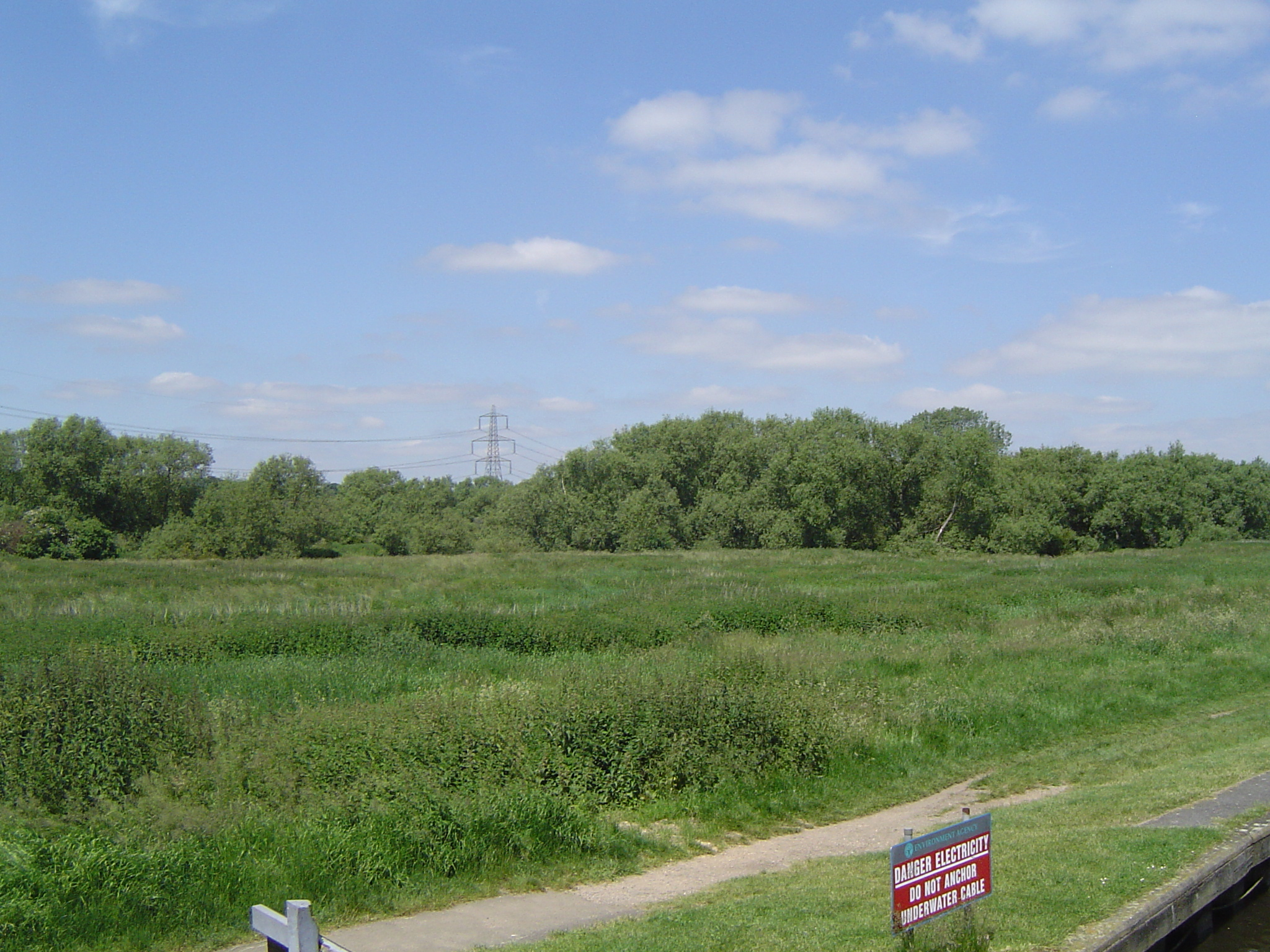
General view of the islands from Sandford Lock

Fiddler's Elbow is the largest of a set of islands in the River Thames in England alongside and upstream of Sandford Lock, near Kennington, Oxfordshire.

Fiddler's Elbow Island is in the shape of a leg of lamb with a wide expanse tapering upstream to a narrow point. The navigation channel passes to the east of the island and the main weir stream, leading to the Sandford Lasher (weir pool) passes to the west. Two smaller weir streams across the lower end of the island create two additional smaller islands. The island is entirely given over to open space and meadowland.

== See also ==
- Islands in the River Thames

Next island upstream	River Thames	Next island downstream
Rose Isle	Fiddler's Elbow	Lock Wood Island
