= The Singing Estate =

- Created by: North One Television
- Starring: Ivor Setterfield
- Country of origin: United Kingdom
- No. of episodes: 4 x 60 mins / 5 x 45 mins

Production
- Production locations: Oxford; Liverpool; London
- Running time: 60 mins / 45 mins

Original release
- Network: Five
- Release: 11 June – 2 July 2006

The Singing Estate is a four-part constructed documentary series made by North One Television for Five and FiveArts Cities in the UK, shot from January 2006 to April 2006 and transmitted from 11 June to 2 July 2006. On the Blackbird Leys estate, in Oxford, conductor Ivor Setterfield auditioned 140 hopeful amateur singers, eventually picking 40 for 'Ivor's Choir' as they were then known. The aim was to teach these singers, many of whom did not read music, several well-known pieces for a concert at the Royal Albert Hall three months later.

The programme followed the audition process in some depth, showing hopefuls and the hopeless, as well as Ivor's reaction to the performances. After the choir line-up was finalised, with some singers held in reserve, they began their public career with a performance of "The Wild Rover" at an Oxford United home game. In subsequent programmes they learned new pieces including Carl Orff's Carmina Burana; visited Italy, where they sang "'O sole mio" with Italian tenor Franco Malapena; held a marquee concert in Blackbird Leys (singing Handel's Hallelujah chorus); travelled to Liverpool, where they rehearsed with a full orchestra for the first time and finally went to London for the big performance of Carmina Burana alongside a youth choir. Shortly before performance day they were surprised with the news that they would also be singing You'll Never Walk Alone with popular classical vocal group G4. The concert took place on 20 April 2006, and was recorded for radio broadcast by Classic FM, and partially included in the TV series.

After the end of filming in April 2006, the choir's future was uncertain, but a core section of members wanted to continue and the renamed Blackbird Leys Choir began rehearsing again in September 2006 for planned performances in Oxford on 14 February (BMW) and 24 February 2007 (the Sheldonian Theatre), including a piece written specially for the choir by minimalist composer Orlando Gough. Funding and support for the rest of the year has been supplied by FiveArts Cities (a collaboration between Channel Five and Arts Council England) and Oxford Contemporary Music, with some donation of sheet music from Oxford University Press.

Queen Elizabeth II had been a fan of the programme, requesting DVD copies of the show to watch, and on 19 December 2006 the choir were invited to perform Christmas carols at an 'Achievers of the Year' reception at Buckingham Palace (other invited guests including David Walliams, Thandiwe Newton, William Fox-Pitt, and Zara Phillips). The choir performed carols for arriving guests for half an hour, and then sang the Hallelujah chorus in a private performance for the Queen, Duke of Edinburgh, Zara Phillips and boyfriend Mike Tindall, and a small selection of guests. The choir's performance was filmed and will appear in the follow-up documentary; portions of it, and interviews with choir members, appeared on Channel Five news on 19 December 2006 and 20 December 2006.

On 14 January 2007, the choir took part in Oxford Sings, a day-long workshop and performance of the Hallelujah chorus with approximately 400 other singers from around Oxfordshire. The rehearsals and performance were filmed by North One Television, and the performance recorded for broadcast the same day on BBC Radio Oxford.

The series was scheduled to be repeated from 27 February 2007, weekly at 19.15, as a series of 5 x 45 minute episodes with the fifth episode showing what has happened to members of the choir since the original series was filmed.
