= Littlemore Brook =

River in Oxfordshire, England

Coordinates: 51.7133°N 1.2285°W

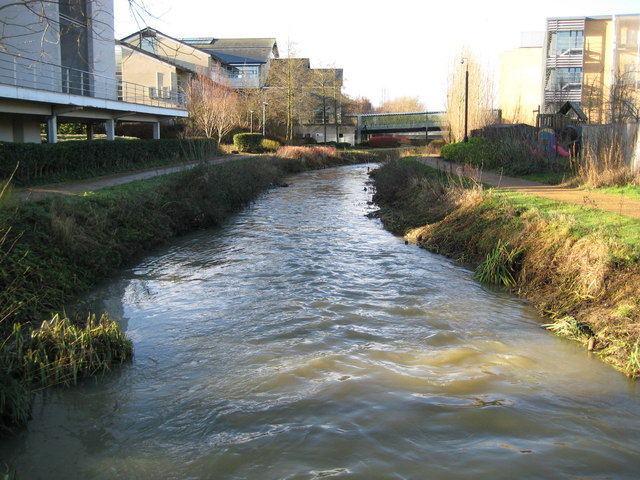
Littlemore Brook running through the Oxford Science Park.

Littlemore Brook is a tributary of the River Thames in Oxfordshire, southern England. It runs from the Blackbird Leys estate in the city of Oxford behind the Kassam Stadium and through the Oxford Science Park to the south of the city, near the village of Littlemore after which it is named. It joins the Thames near Sandford-on-Thames.

The brook contains many species of fish such as chub, perch, roach, jack pike, dace and even brown trout. It also provides a habitat to bird species such as the grey heron, kingfisher, mallard, and coots.
