= Kennington Railway Bridge =

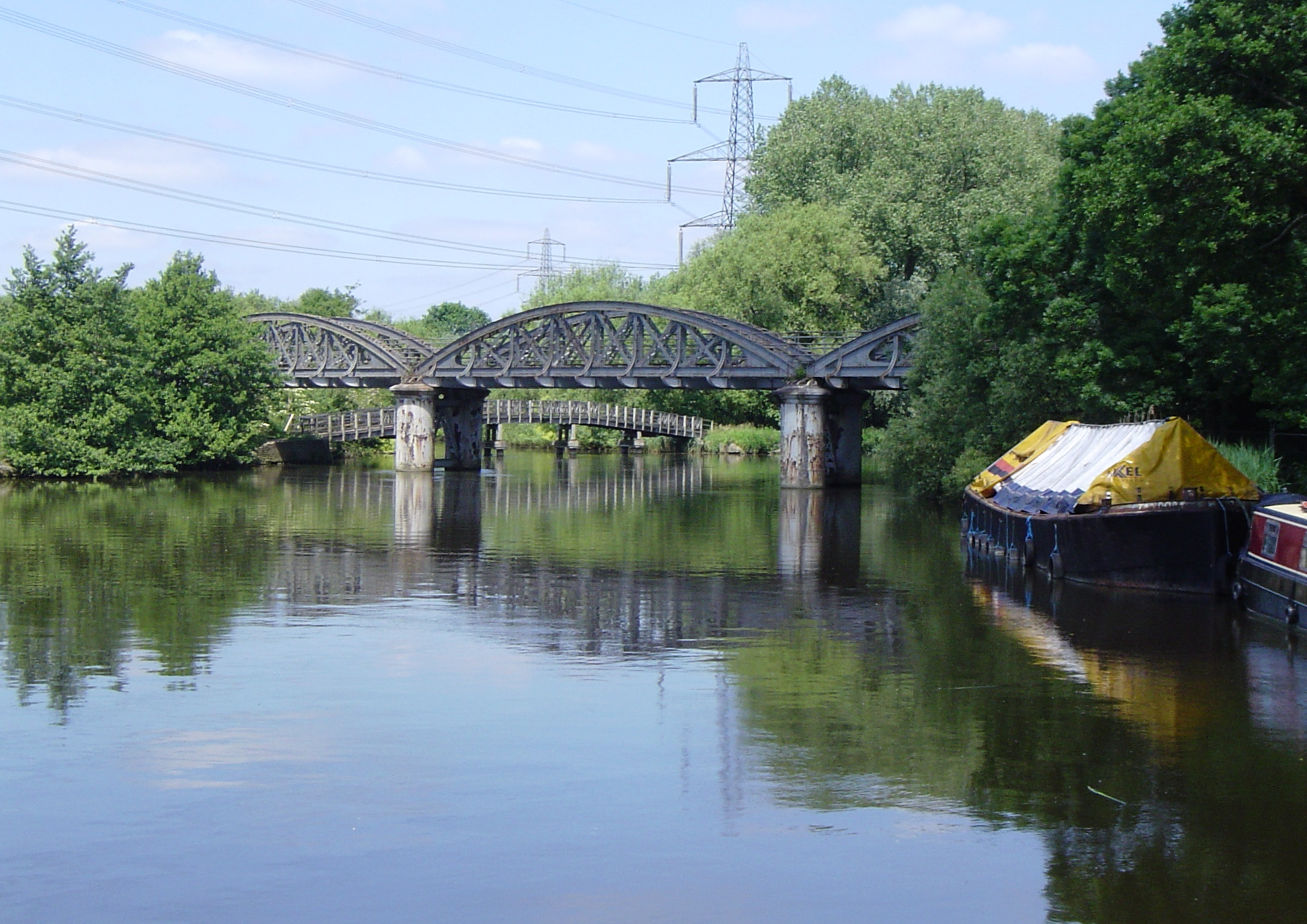
- Kennington Railway Bridge from downstream. Beyond the bridge can be seen the crossing at the confluence of Hinksey Stream.
- Coordinates: 51.721345°N 1.242253°W
- Carries: Former Wycombe Railway
- Crosses: River Thames
- Locale: Kennington, Oxfordshire
- Maintained by: Network Rail

Characteristics
- Design: bowstring bridge
- Material: Steel
- Height: 13 feet 6 inches (4.11 m)
- Longest span: 83 feet (25 m)
- No. of spans: 3

Rail characteristics
- No. of tracks: 1
- Track gauge: standard gauge

History
- Designer: AC Cookson, ACGI, MICE
- Constructed by: George Palmer
- Fabrication by: Horseley Bridge and Engineering Co Ltd
- Opened: 1923
- Replaces: 5-span bridge built in 1863

Location
- Interactive map of Kennington Railway Bridge

Kennington Railway Bridge is a railway bridge over the River Thames near Kennington, Oxfordshire between Sandford Lock and Iffley Lock. It carries the freight railway branch line that serves the BMW Mini factory at Cowley. The freight railway is part of the former Wycombe Railway that linked Maidenhead and Oxford via High Wycombe and Princes Risborough.

The current bridge was built for the Great Western Railway in 1923. It is a steel bowstring bridge of three equal spans, each 83 feet (25 m) long. The railway on the bridge is on a curve with a radius of 12 chains (240 m). The bridge crosses the river askew.

== Earlier bridge and replacement ==
The current bridge replaces a five-span plate girder bridge built for the Wycombe Railway in 1863. In 1914 Great Western Railway engineers noted that some of the screw piles of the old bridge had settled slightly. They wanted to replace the bridge but were prevented by the First World War. Therefore, with the consent of the Thames Conservancy, the GWR shored up the bridge with wooden trestles resting on foundations of bagged cement until the end of wartime restrictions would allow the bridge to be replaced.

In 1923 the new bridge was built parallel to the old one. The GWR had it designed in-house, but contracted its construction to George Palmer of Neath, Glamorgan. The Horseley Bridge and Engineering Co Ltd of Tipton was subcontracted to make the six bowstrings for the three new spans. Each span is 83 feet (25 m) long and weighs 23 tons.

The GWR transported each completed bowstring from Tipton to Kennington by rail on a pair of Pollen C four-wheeled wagons. At the bridge site each bowstring was lifted into place by two rail-mounted 36-ton cranes. When the new bridge was completed, the railway was realigned for a distance of 10 chains (200 m) either side to cross the new bridge. The old bridge was then dismantled and its piers and temporary trestles demolished.

== Halt ==
At the western end of the bridge is the site of the former Iffley Halt railway station.

== See also ==
- Crossings of the River Thames

== Sources ==
- Cookson, AC (1923). "Reconstruction of Kennington Viaduct over the River Thames near Littlemore Station". Great Western Magazine: 443–447.
- Mitchell, Vic; Smith, Keith (2003). "Kennington Junction". Branch Lines to Princes Risborough. Midhurst: Middleton Press. ISBN 1-904474-05-5.

| Next crossing upstream | River Thames | Next crossing downstream |
| Isis Bridge (road) | Kennington Railway Bridge | Sandford Lock (pedestrian) |
