= Hundred of Hormer =

Ancient hundred of Berkshire, England

Coordinates: 51.72°N 1.29°W

Hormer was an ancient hundred of Berkshire, England. It consisted of the area immediately west of Oxford within the bend of the River Thames, all of which was transferred to Oxfordshire on 1 April 1974 in accordance with the Local Government Act 1972. It included the ancient parishes of

- Abingdon
- Besselsleigh
- Cumnor
- North Hinksey
- South Hinksey
- Radley
- Seacourt
- Sunningwell
- Wootton
- Wytham
- St. Helen (part)

The hundred also included the almost uninhabited extra-parochial area of Bagley Wood, which became a civil parish in 1858 and was joined to Radley in 1900.

The name of the hundred is derived from what was presumably its original meeting place, an unidentified Horningamere "pool of the Hornings". The Hornings were the people who lived in the "horn", the angle of land in Berkshire enclosed by the bend of the Thames.

The hundred came into existence before the time of the Domesday Book in 1086, when it had the same area except for the parish of Besselsleigh, which joined the hundred by 1321. In 1086 the entire hundred belonged to Abingdon Abbey. The court of the hundred met at Bagley Wood, and later at Cumnor.
