= Sandford Hydro =

Hydroelectric power station in Oxford, England

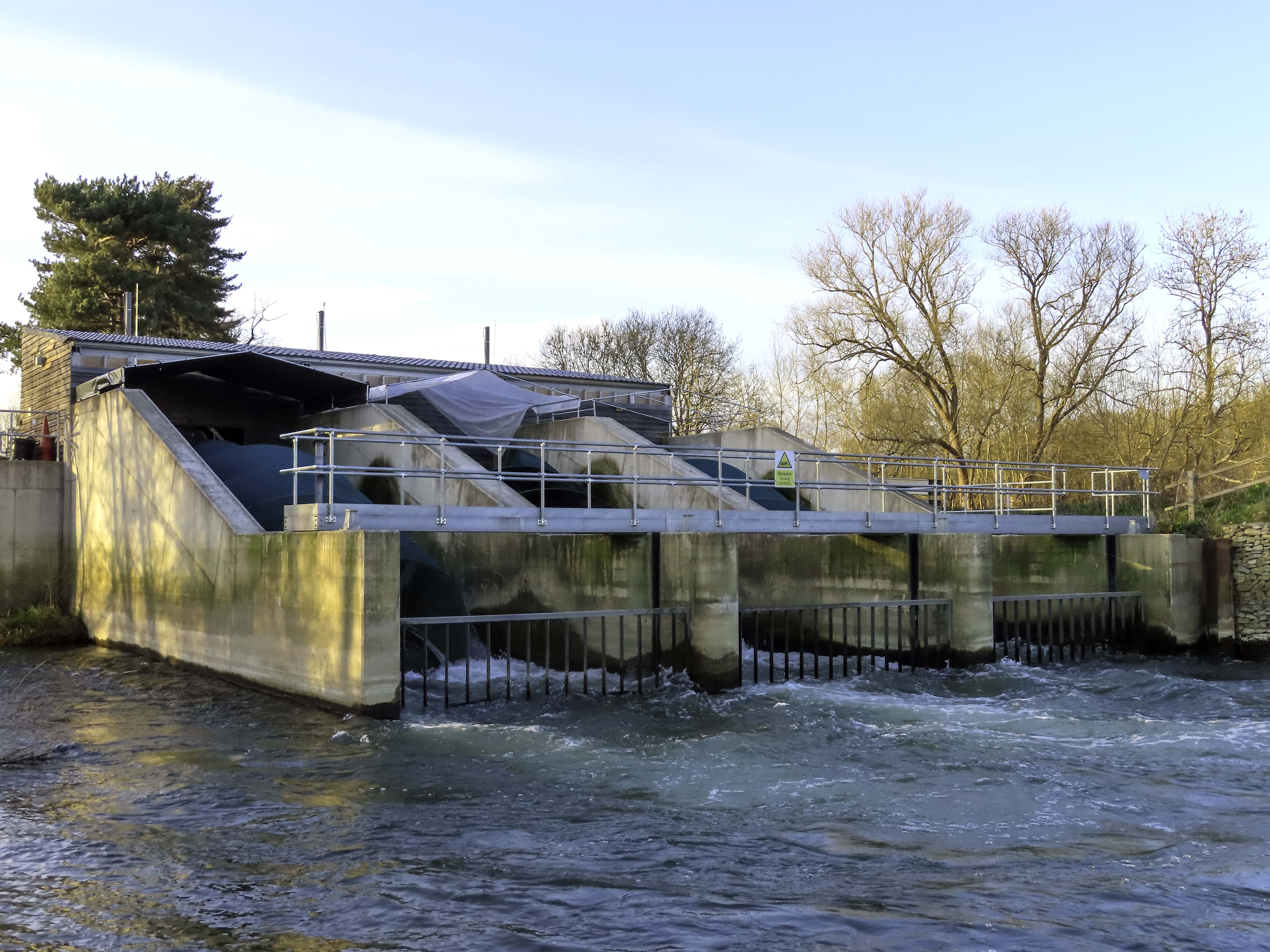
- Country: England
- Location: Kennington, Oxfordshire
- Coordinates: 51.7115°N 1.2361°W
- Status: Operational
- Commission date: 2018
- Owner: Low Carbon Hub Sandford Hydro Ltd
- Operator: Low Carbon Hub Sandford Hydro Ltd

Power generation
- Nameplate capacity: 450 kW

External links
- Commons: Related media on Commons

Sandford Hydro is a small hydroelectric scheme located on the River Thames in Oxfordshire, England. It uses the head of water provided by the weir at Sandford Lock in Sandford-on-Thames, but is actually situated on the opposite bank of the river in Kennington. It can generate 450 kilowatts (600 hp) of electricity with its three archimedes screw turbines. Construction began in 2011, and the plant became operational in 2018.

Sandford Hydro is owned by Low Carbon Hub Sandford Hydro Ltd, which is itself a subsidiary the Low Carbon Hub IPS Ltd, an industrial and provident society for the benefit of the community that seeks to develop a decentralised, locally owned renewable energy infrastructure for Oxfordshire.

As part of the development of the hydro scheme, a new fish pass has been constructed. It is designed to help fish adapted to both fast and slow watercourses, and comprises a 120 metres (390 ft) gravel-lined channel with a gradient of 1 in 160, flanked at either end by sections with a gradient of 1 in 20 and brush and baffle components.

In 2025, solar photovoltaic panels were installed across the south-facing sections of the plant, including over the turbine screws and on the roof of a new plant room, to generate clean energy during periods of low river flow.

== Gallery ==
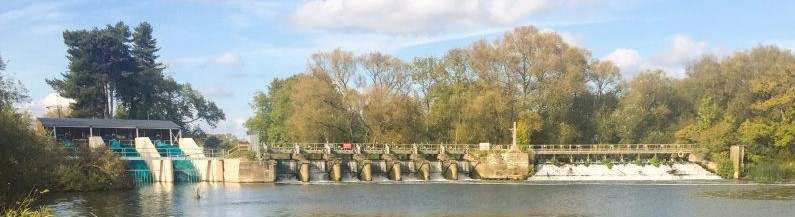
The turbines and the weir

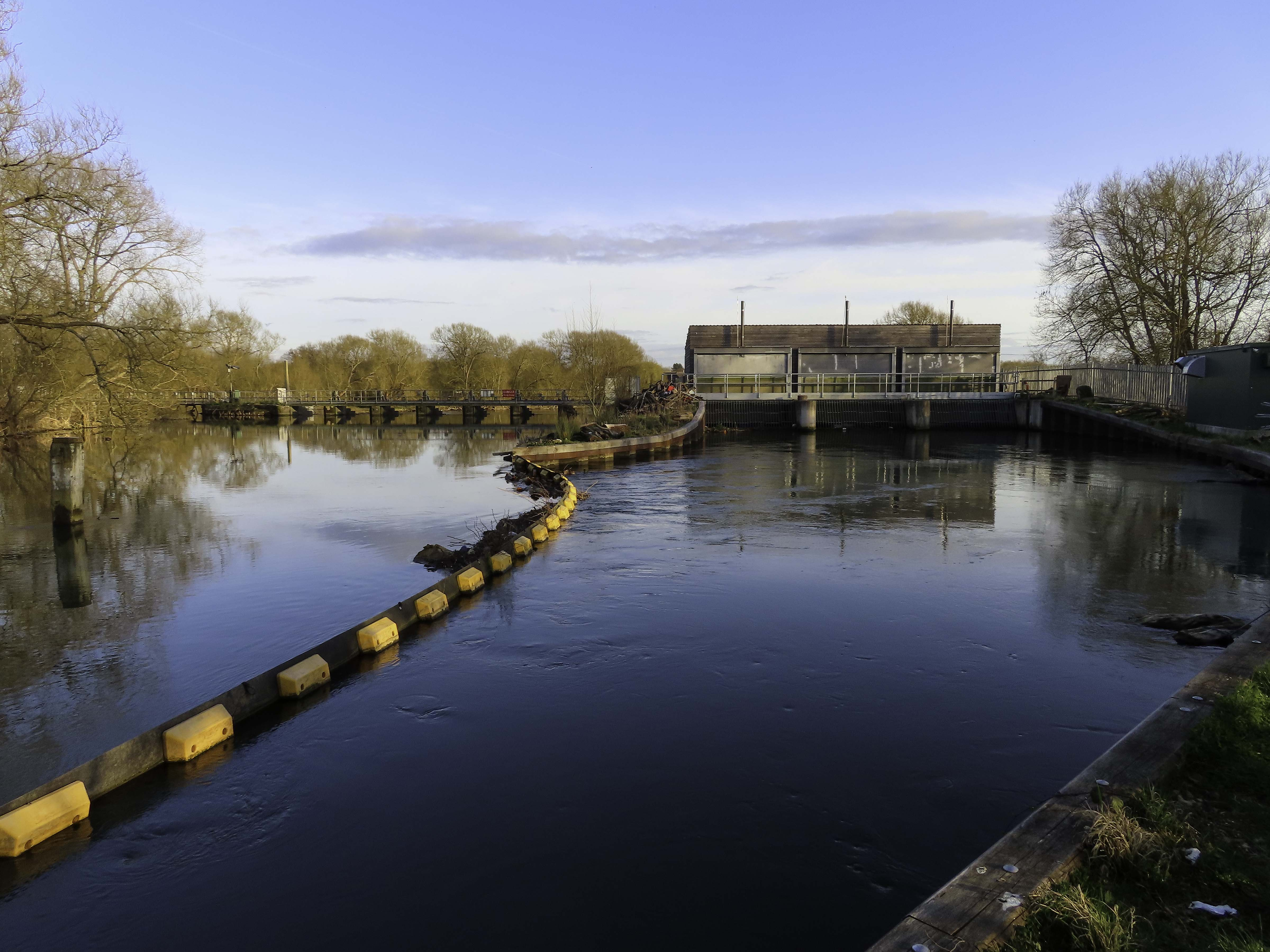
Upstream side of the plant

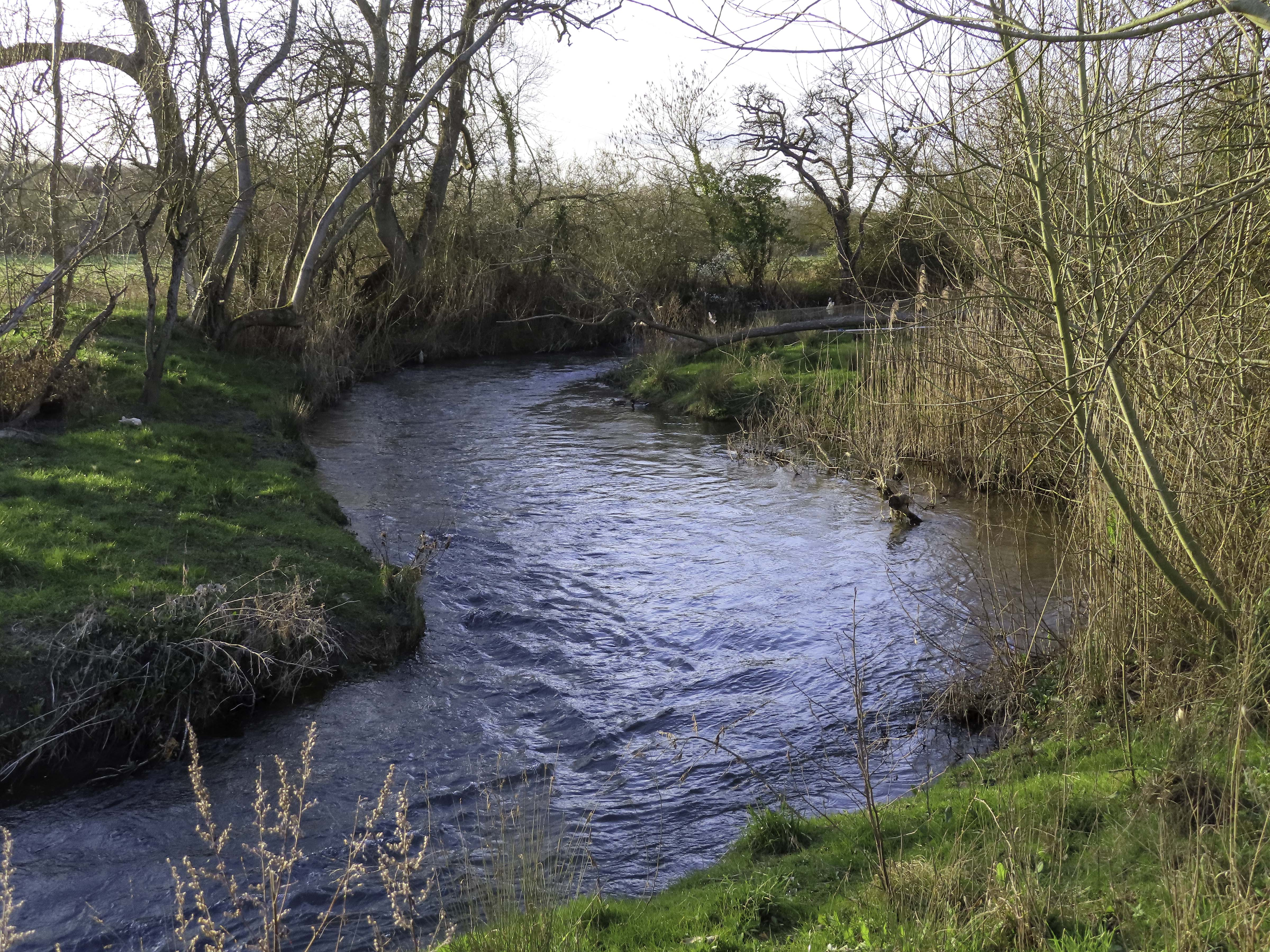
The fish pass

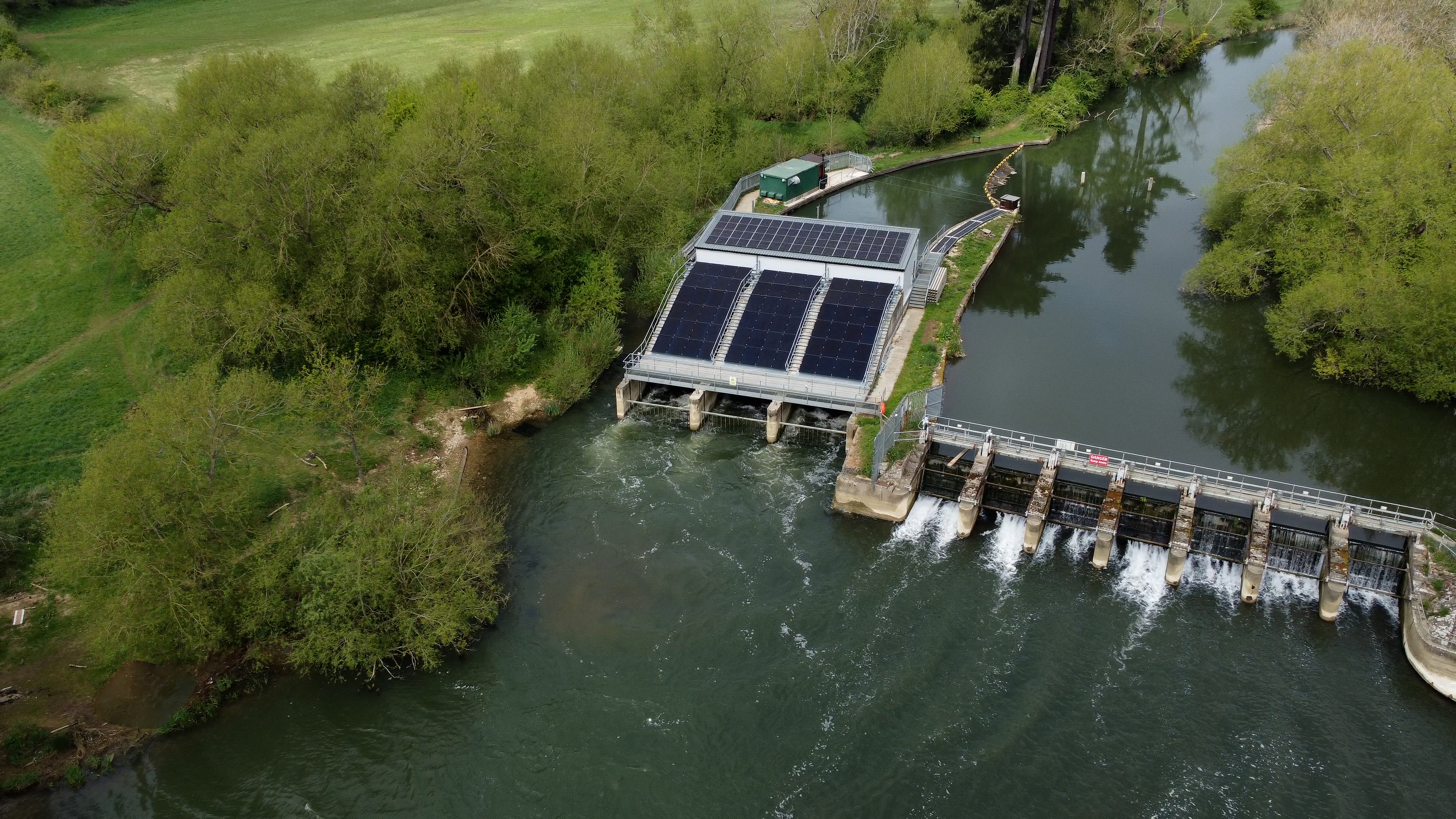
Sandford Hydro with solar in Oxfordshire
