= Isis Bridge =

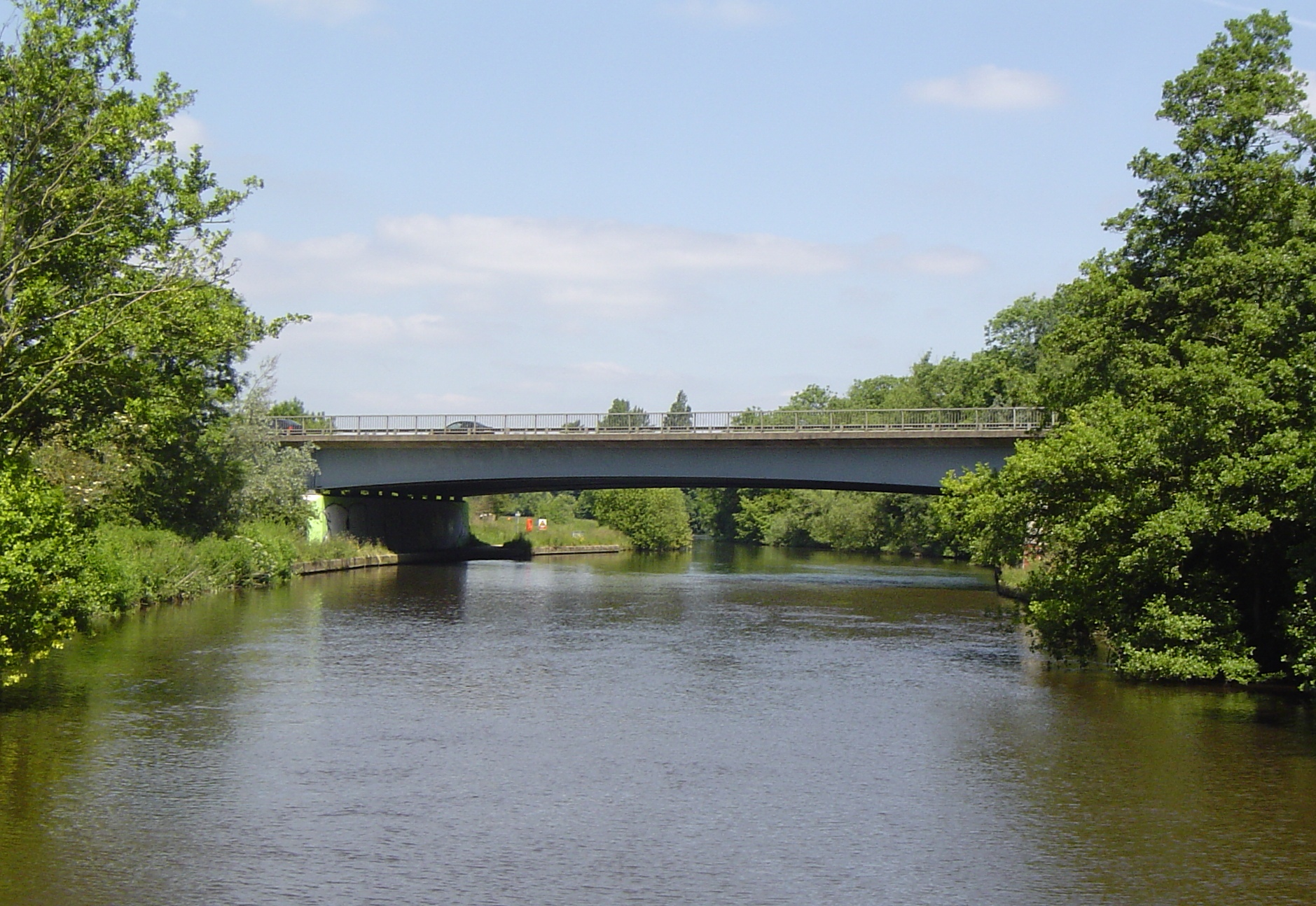
- Isis Bridge from downstream
- Coordinates: 51.724893°N 1.241687°W
- Carries: A423 road
- Crosses: River Thames
- Locale: Oxford
- Maintained by: Oxfordshire County Council

Characteristics
- Design: Continuous three girder spans
- Material: Steel with composite reinforced concrete slab deck
- Height: 16 feet 6 inches (5.03 m)
- No. of spans: 3

History
- Designer: British Constructional Steelwork Association, for Oxfordshire C.C. as agent for Dept. of Transport
- Opened: 1965

Location
- Interactive map of Isis Bridge

Isis Bridge is a modern road bridge across the River Thames just south of Oxford, England. It carries the Oxford Ring Road, part of the A423 road, across the Thames on the reach between Sandford Lock and Iffley Lock.

The bridge was built in the 1960s and opened to road traffic in 1965 when the section of the ring road between South Hinksey and Heyford Hill was opened. It is a single arch structure, built of 5,000m² steel by British Constructional Steelwork Association for Oxfordshire County Council who are responsible for its maintenance. The bridge required a full wet and dry blast and coating system to the steelwork in 2003 when it was also strengthened.

== See also ==
- Crossings of the River Thames

Next crossing upstream	River Thames	Next crossing downstream
Iffley Lock (pedestrian)	Isis Bridge	Kennington Railway Bridge (railway)
