= Oxford Science Park =

Research park in Oxfordshire, England

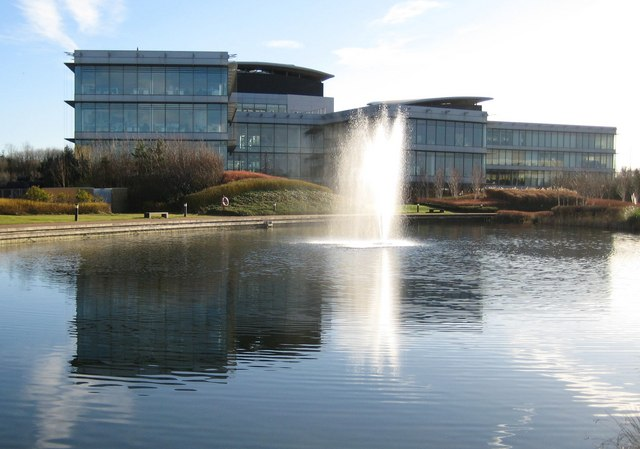
- View of Oxford Science Park
- Interactive map of Oxford Science Park
- Location: Oxford, UK
- Coordinates: 51°42′57″N 1°13′06″W
- Opening date: 1991
- Owner: Magdalen College, Oxford; Ellison Institute of Technology
- Architect: Foster + Partners
- No. of tenants: 100
- No. of workers: 3000
- Size: 70 acres
- Public transit: Cowley Branch Line
- Website: https://oxfordsp.com/

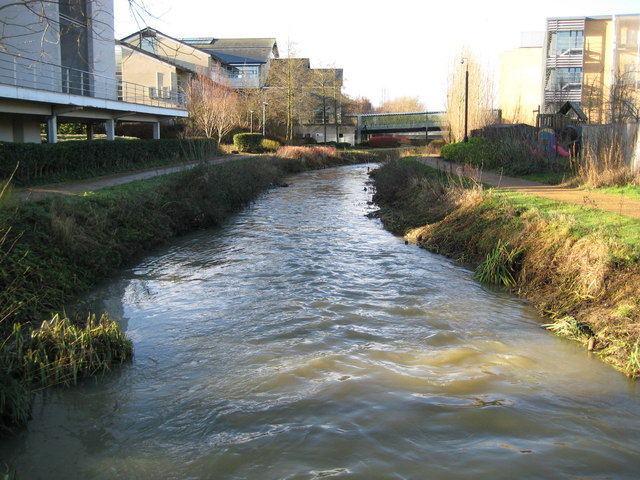
Littlemore Brook, a tributary of the River Thames that runs through the Oxford Science Park from the Blackbird Leys estate in Oxford.

The Oxford Science Park (OSP) is a science and technology park located on the southern edge of the city of Oxford, England. The 70 acre site was officially opened in 1991 and initially owned entirely by Magdalen College, Oxford, though a portion was sold in 2025 for the creation of the Ellison Institute of Technology. The park maintains strong links with the nearby University of Oxford and contains just over companies as of March 2026.

== Facilities ==
There are two amenity buildings on the Science Park, the Magdalen Centre and the Sadler Building. Both contain:

- Cafe/restaurant
- Conference suite
- Meeting rooms

There is a nursery on the Science Park operated by The Oxford Nursery. There is also an Oxford Science Park Netball Club.

In 2025 it was announced that passenger service was being restored on the Cowley Branch Line, after being closed in 1963, to provide transit links for the Oxford Science Park.

== Location ==
The science park is situated in Littlemore, which is about 5 km to the south of Oxford city centre, south of the Oxford Ring Road.

== See also ==
- Begbroke Science Park
- Cambridge Science Park
- List of science parks in the United Kingdom
- Science Area, Oxford
