= Bagley Wood =

Woodland in Kennington, Oxfordshire, England

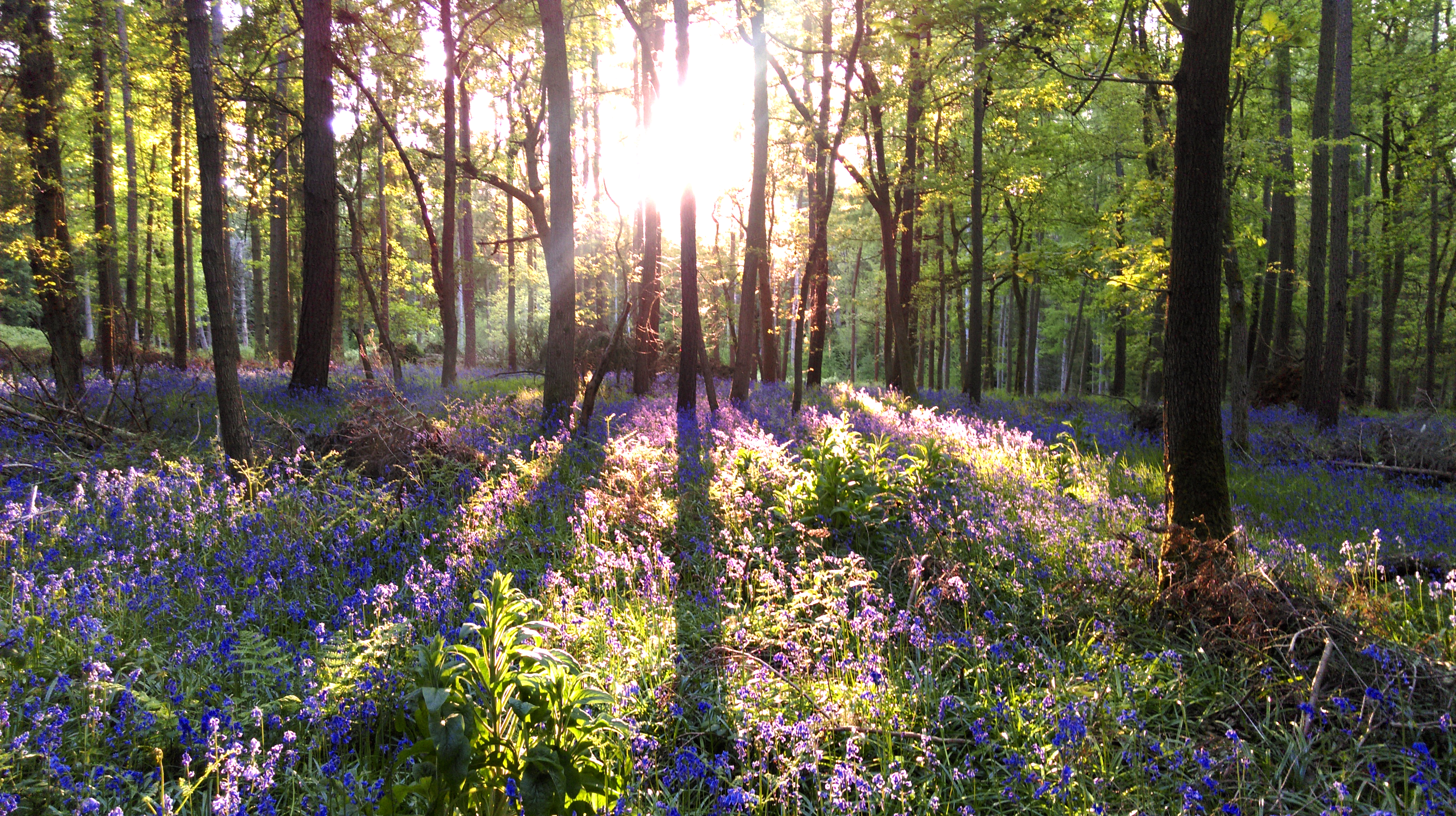

- Location within Oxfordshire

Geography
- Location: Oxfordshire, England
- OS grid: SP510024
- Coordinates: 51.7180°N 1.2611°W

Administration
- Authority: St John's College, Oxford

Bagley Wood is a wood in the parish of Kennington, in the Vale of White Horse district, between Oxford and Abingdon in Oxfordshire, England (in Berkshire until 1974). It is traversed from north to south by the A34 road, which was rerouted through the wood in 1972.

== History ==
Bagley Wood is an ancient wood. Except for a few years in the 16th century it has had only two owners since 955. From 955 to 1538 it was owned by Abingdon Abbey, and since 1557 most of the wood has been owned by St John's College, Oxford. Bagley Wood was historically an extra-parochial area in the hundred of Hormer. In 1858 it was made a civil parish, although its population in the 1891 census was only 4. On 1 April 1900 the civil parish became part of the parish of Radley, and in 1936 it was transferred to Kennington when that parish was formed.

The wood is open to permissive public access on maintained (‘Stone’ or ‘mown’) routes, via gated entrances.

== References in popular culture ==
- Bagley Wood is the subject of a poem by the Victorian poet Lionel Pigot Johnson.
- Bagley Wood features as a fictional murder scene in the 2012 pilot episode of the ITV detective series Endeavour.
