= Ivor Setterfield =

Ivor Setterfield is a British conductor and countertenor. Setterfield is currently musical director of London's largest choir, Barts Choir, and founder and artistic director of the Trafalgar Sinfonia.

== Education ==
After beginning his musical studies with the violin, then as a boy treble at St Albans Cathedral, Setterfield studied at the University of York, graduating with a BA (Hons) in Music. He continued his studies at the Royal Academy of Music, first on the opera course and then the conducting course. He followed the conducting course with an Opera Conducting Scholarship at the London Royal Schools’ Joint Vocal Faculty. He completed his studies with a broadcast master class with the great Russian pedagogues Ilya Musin and Valery Gergiev, in Sienna.

== Recordings ==
Setterfield has recorded a number of albums including Vivaldi Gloria, Requiem, Martin & Pizzetti, Sweet was the Song: a collection of English music for Christmas, and Rachmaninov's Vespers.

== Television ==
Setterfield has appeared in a number of TV shows. His documentary The Singing Estate, shown on the UK's Channel 5, was nominated for the Rose d’Or award. On the BBC show Maestro, he mentored the DJ Goldie, who achieved second place, despite having come out on top in the judges ratings. The BBC brought the pair together again for Classic Goldie. Setterfield again mentored Goldie, this time in the composition of a piece for the Family Prom. Setterfield also appeared on a number of other TV shows, including Richard and Judy, The Wright show and The One Show as well as 10 Best Choral Masterpieces for BBC4.
