= Kennington, Oxfordshire =

Village in Oxfordshire, England

Coordinates: 51.717°N 1.250°W

Kennington
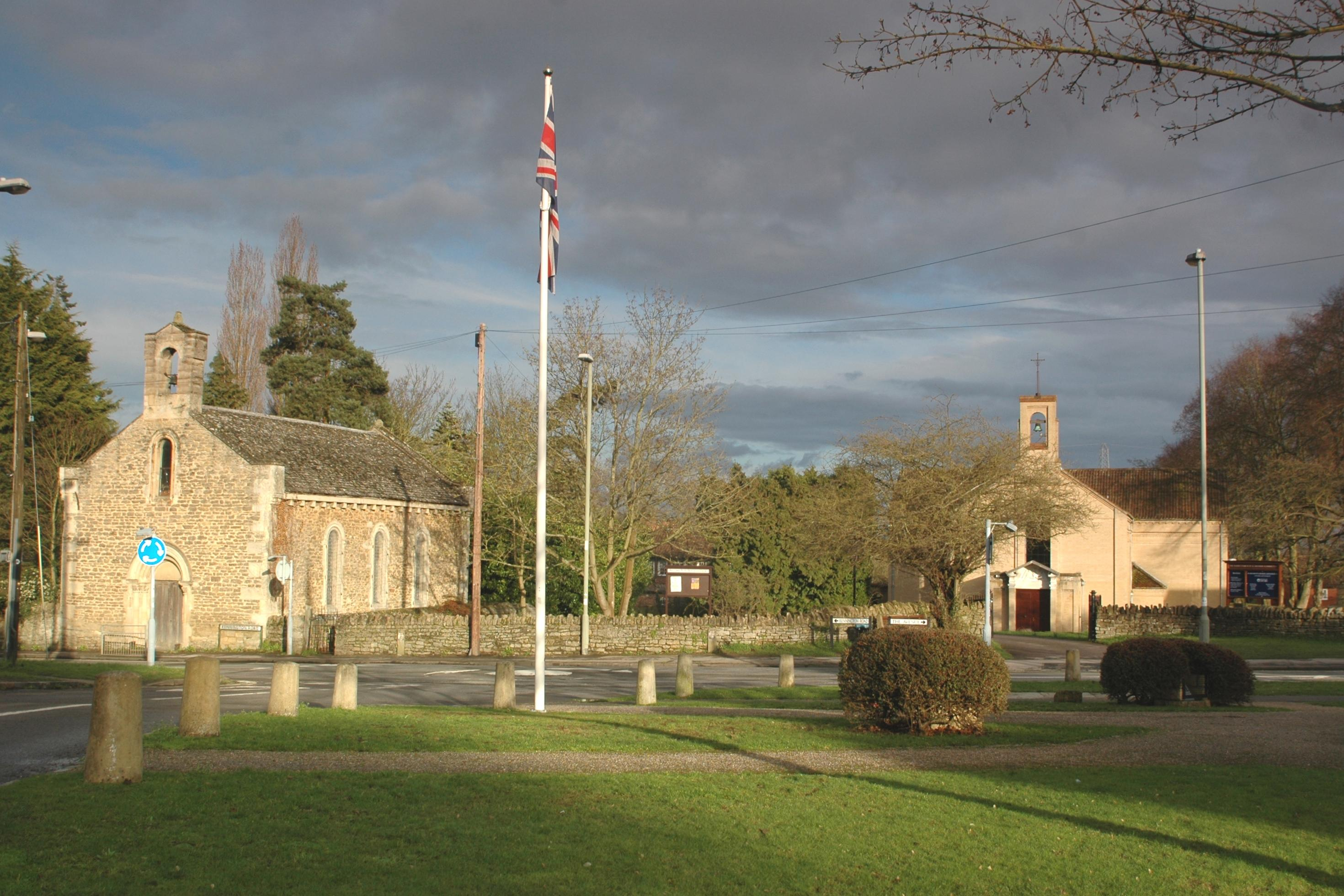
- Present (right) and former (left) St Swithun's parish churches

- Location within Oxfordshire
- Population: 4,076 (2011 census)
- OS grid reference: SP5202
- Civil parish: Kennington
- District: Vale of White Horse
- Shire county: Oxfordshire
- Region: South East
- Country: England
- Sovereign state: United Kingdom
- Post town: Oxford
- Postcode district: OX1
- Dialling code: 01865
- Police: Thames Valley
- Fire: Oxfordshire
- Ambulance: South Central
- UK Parliament: Oxford West and Abingdon
- Website: Kennington Online

Kennington is a village and civil parish in the Vale of White Horse district of Oxfordshire, just south of Oxford. The village occupies a narrow stretch of land between the River Thames and the A34 dual carriageway. It was in Berkshire until the 1974 boundary changes transferred it to Oxfordshire.

Kennington was partly in South Hinksey parish and partly in Radley parish until 1936, when a new Kennington civil parish was constituted. Apart from the village, most of Kennington civil parish is wooded, including all of Bagley Wood and West Wood to the west of the village.

== Notable buildings ==
The manor house is Jacobean, built in 1629 during the Great Rebuilding of England. It is half-timbered, i.e. its upper storey is timber-framed but its lower storey is not. In this case the lower storey is of local limestone.

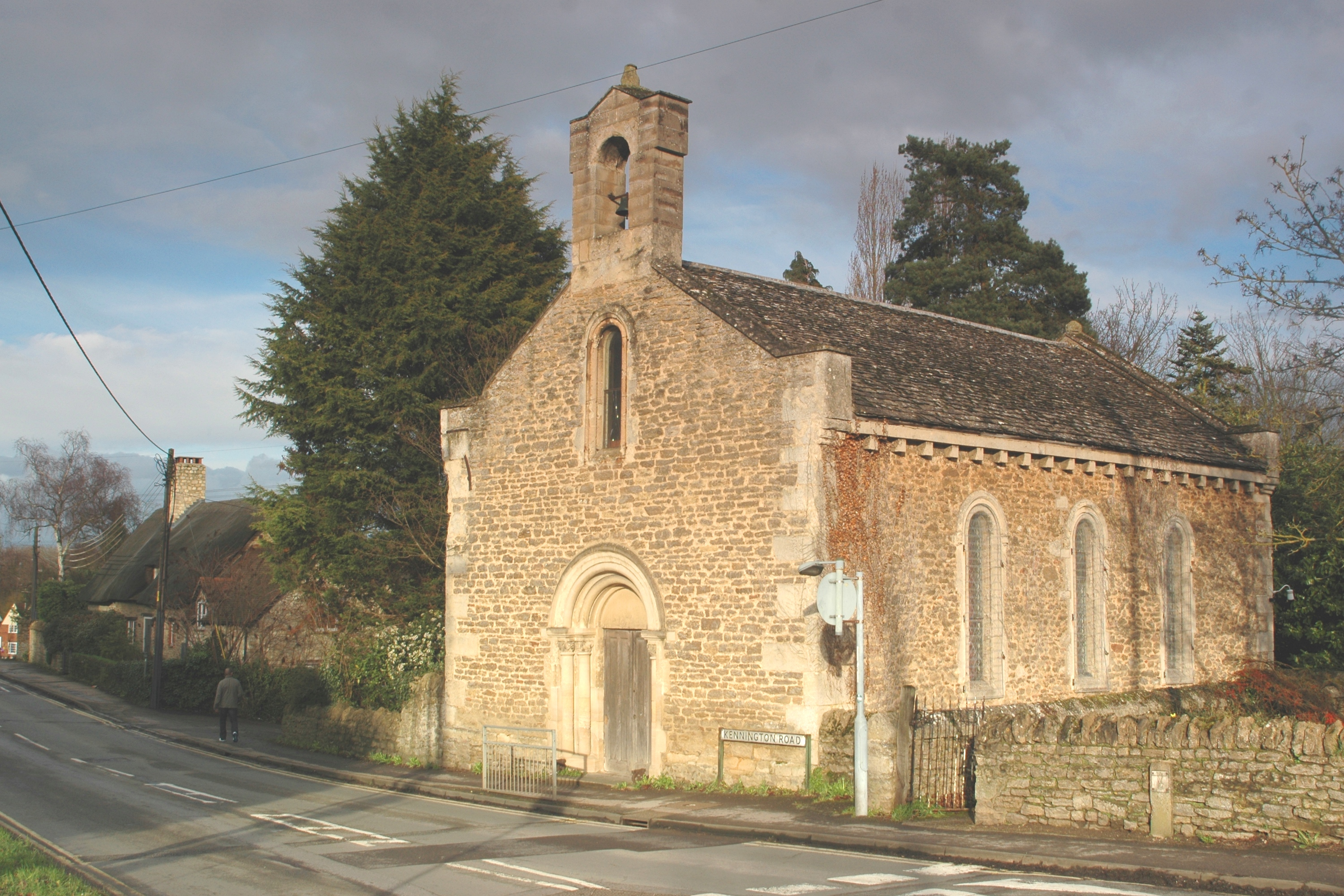
St Swithun's former parish church, built 1828.

The Church of England parish of St Swithun has two churches. The first is a very early example of the Norman revival, designed by the architect Daniel Robertson and built in 1828. The second was built alongside it in 1956–58, designed by a local architect, T. Lawrence Dale, and the vicar, Rev. S.S. Davies. The 1828 building is now deconsecrated.

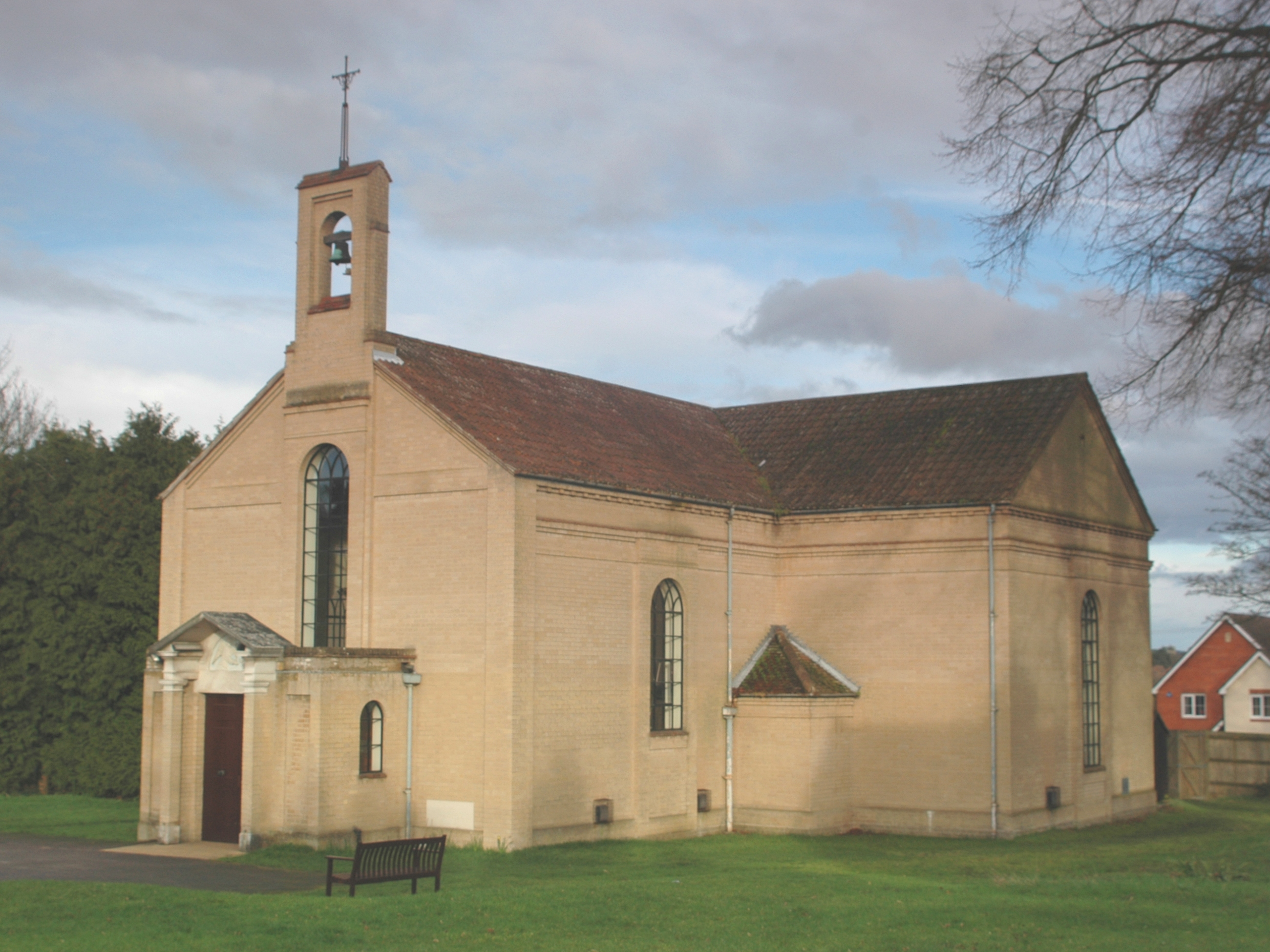
The present St Swithun's parish church, completed 1958.

== Education ==
The local primary school is St Swithun's Church of England School. The village is in the catchment area for Matthew Arnold secondary school. Matthew Arnold School is not located in the village but a bus service is provided. Chandlings School, an independent co-educational preparatory school, is nearby.

== Amenities ==
Kennington has a public house, The Tandem. The village has a health centre, two shops, a post office and a pharmacist. There are two sports fields: Playfield Road and Forest Side. The men's senior team for Kennington Athletic FC, the village's only football club, play their home games at Playfield Road while their youth teams play home games on both fields. Playfield Road is also used as the home ground for Wolvercote Cricket Club's 3rd and 4th teams.

Behind the Playfield Road field lies the Kennington Memorial Field, dedicated to the six men from Kennington who lost their lives in the Second World War.

== Developments ==
There has been a great increase in residential building development in the village recently. The developments are all large houses with large gardens which have been turned into flats. The two exceptions are the new houses at the site of the former public house The Scholar Gypsy (named after the local poet, Matthew Arnold) and flats on the site of the former Kennington Service Station. Recent developments include Strode Court, and Chestnut Place on Kennington Road, to the north of the village. A new development has been completed at the site of Cranbrook House in the south of the village on The Avenue.

Sandford Hydro, a hydro-electric plant, was constructed on the Kennington bank of the Thames between 2011 and 2018. Owned and operated by Low Carbon Hub Sandford Hydro Ltd, a subsidiary of Low Carbon Hub, it uses the head of water provided by the Sandford Lasher weir and can generate up to 450 kilowatts (600 hp) of electricity with its three Archimedes screw turbines. In 2025, solar photovoltaic panels were installed across the site to supplement generation during periods of low river flow.

== Local organisations ==
A brass band was set up in the village in 1973, originally named the Kennington (Oxford) Youth Band. The musical director was Ron Sudworth. The band grew and developed and was soon entering and winning contests all across England. The word Youth was dropped from its name as the age of the members rose. It won the National 4th Section title at Pontins Holiday Camp in 1977 and progressed to the upper reaches of the National 2nd section by 1981. Although it has long since ceased participating in contests, the band is still very active. It practises each Sunday morning at the Youth Club and performs regularly throughout Oxfordshire and beyond.

== Sources and further reading ==
- Page, W.H.; Ditchfield, P.H., eds. (1924). A History of the County of Berkshire, Volume 4. Victoria County History. pp. 410–416.
- Pevsner, Nikolaus (1966). Berkshire. The Buildings of England. Harmondsworth: Penguin Books. pp. 159–160.
