= Iffley Lock =

Lock on the River Thames in Oxfordshire, England

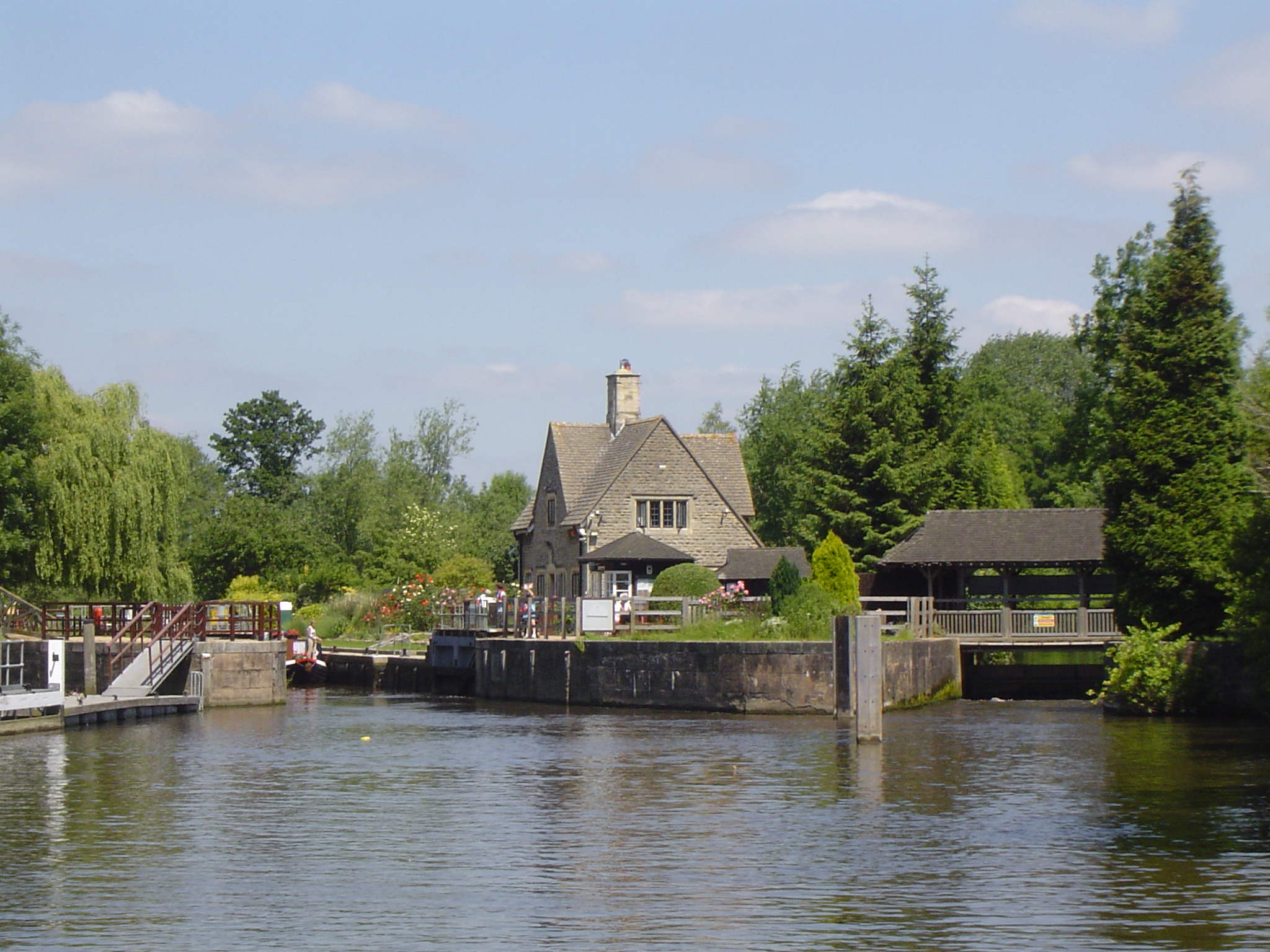
- Iffley Lock from downstream
- Interactive map of Iffley Lock
- 51°43′42.45″N 1°14′25.21″W
- Waterway: River Thames
- County: Oxfordshire
- Maintained by: Environment Agency
- Operation: Hydraulic
- First built: 1631
- Latest built: 1927
- Length: 46.96 m (154 ft 1 in)
- Width: 6.47 m (21 ft 3 in)
- Fall: 0.81 m (2 ft 8 in)
- Above sea level: 178'
- Distance to Teddington Lock: 91 miles

Iffley Lock is a lock on the River Thames in England near the village of Iffley, Oxfordshire. It is on the southern outskirts of Oxford. The original lock was built by the Oxford-Burcot Commission in 1631 and the Thames Navigation Commission replaced this in 1793. The lock has a set of rollers to allow punts and rowing boats to be moved between the water levels.

In addition the lock and weir streams there is stream further to the east which used to be the Mill Stream.

The weir is downstream of the lock, where the weir stream is joined by the mill stream.

== History ==
A weir was owned by Lincoln College as early as 1302 and this weir may have carried the bridge which is referenced earlier than this. Iffley Lock was the pound lock furthest upstream that was built by the Oxford-Burcot Commission in 1631. In 1790 the Thames Commissioners took over Iffley and the other Oxford-Burcot locks at Sandford and Swift Ditch. The Commission rebuilt the lock in 1793, and the keeper was instructed to take tolls for "punts, pleasure boats, skiffs and wherries" at a charge of sixpence for punts and skiffs and one shilling for four oared craft. However access to the lock was awkward for barge traffic heading for the Thames and Severn Canal which had to enter backwards and take down their masts. Improvements and enlargements were made to the lock in 1802 and 1806 and the stone lockhouse was built in 1810. In 1826, it was ordered that no craft should pass through the lock during the hours of divine service. In the middle of the 19th century there was a problem with water levels below the water and a witness to a parliamentary enquiry reported that cows and horses were sometimes driven into the river to create sufficient draught. The lock was repaired in 1866, and ten years later the lock was being blamed for flooding in Oxford. Although the boat slide was promised in 1885, at the same time the Thames Conservancy were considering removing the lock. However there were many petitions to retain it and it survived.

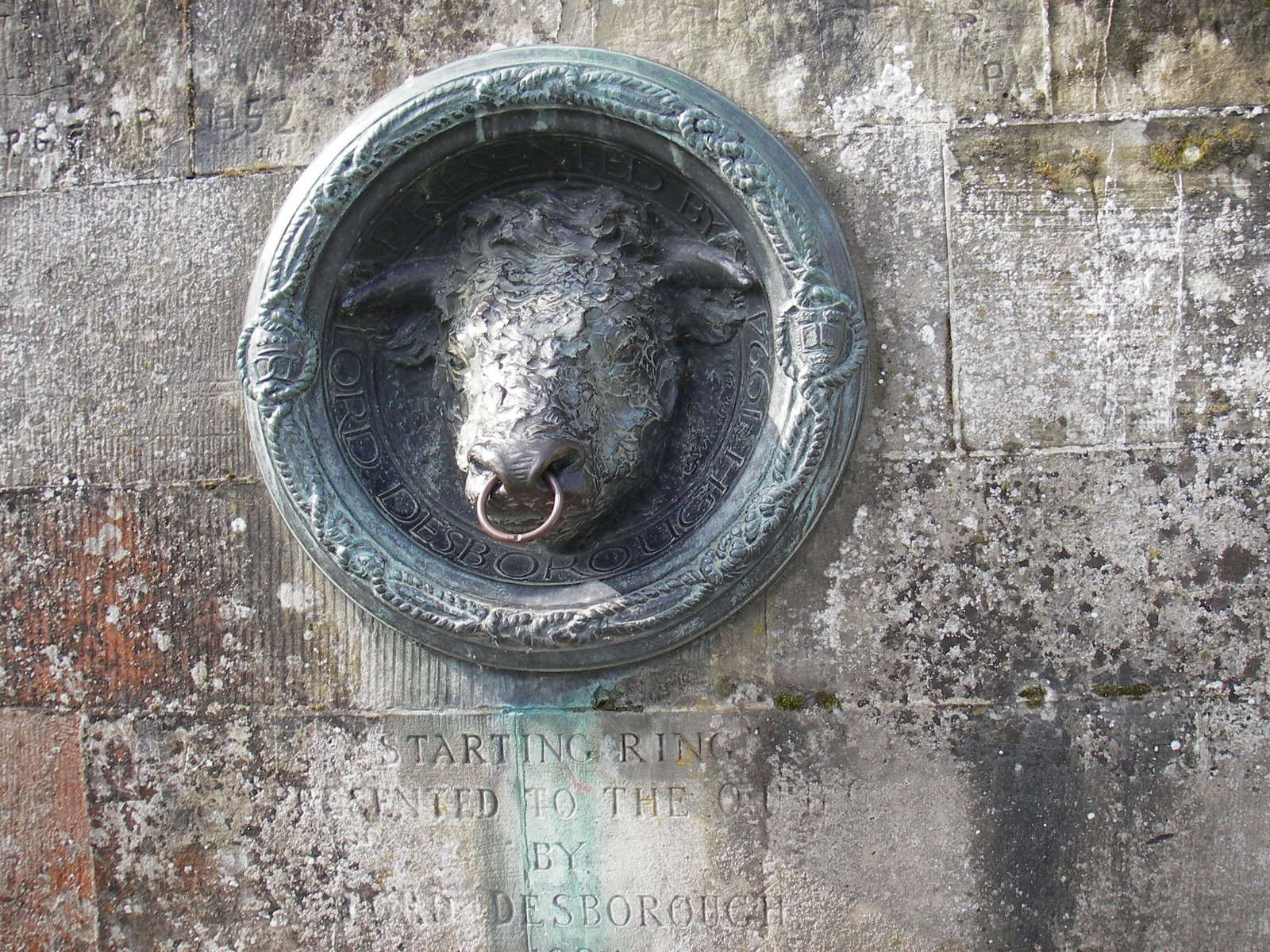
Starting Ring presented to OUBC by Lord Desborough 1924

The latest rebuilding took place in 1927.

== Access to the lock ==
The lock can be reached on foot on the track from Donnington Bridge on the western side or from Iffley village on the eastern side. The lock can be crossed on foot.

== Reach above the lock ==
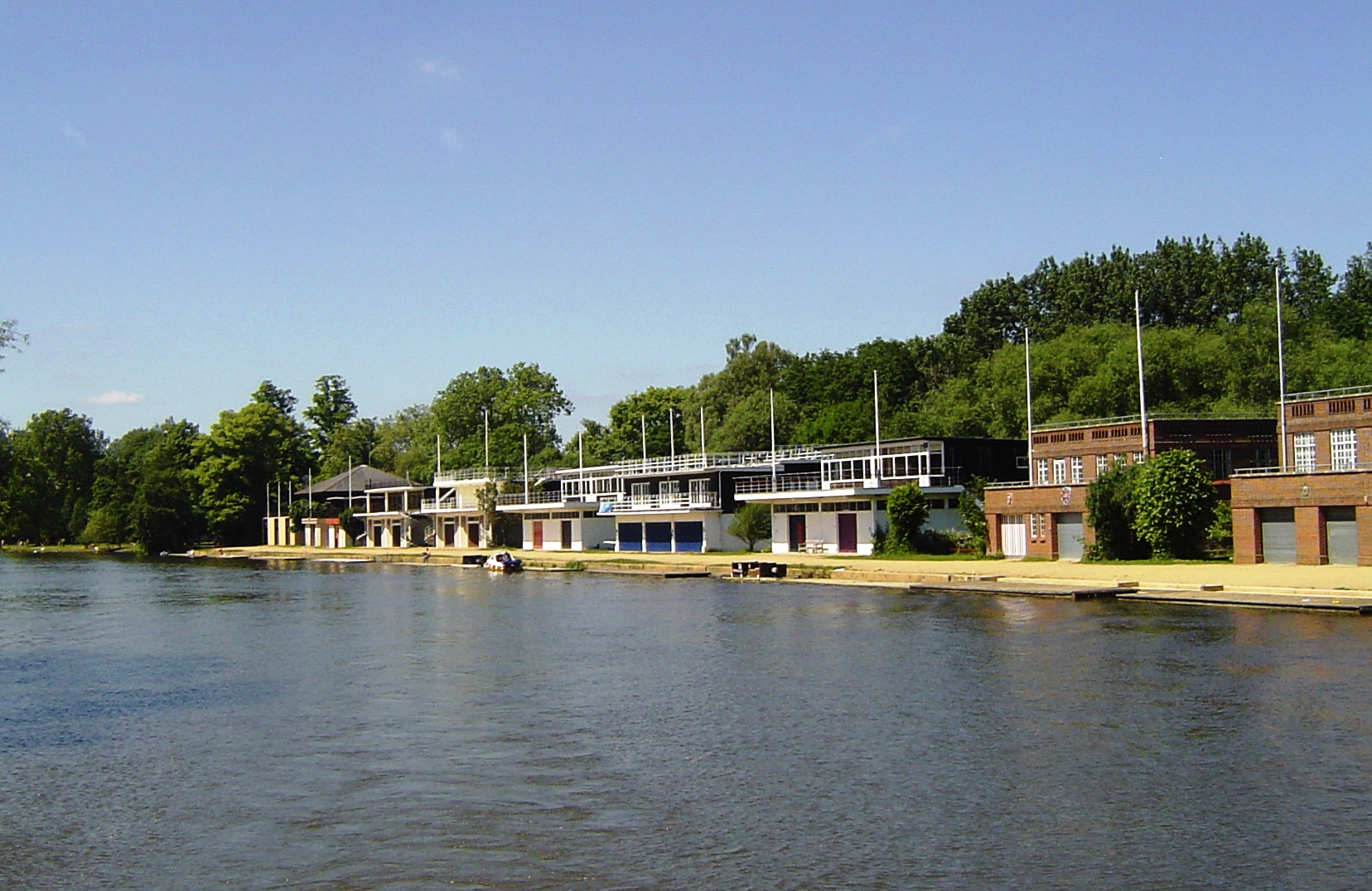
College boathouses and Christ Church Meadow

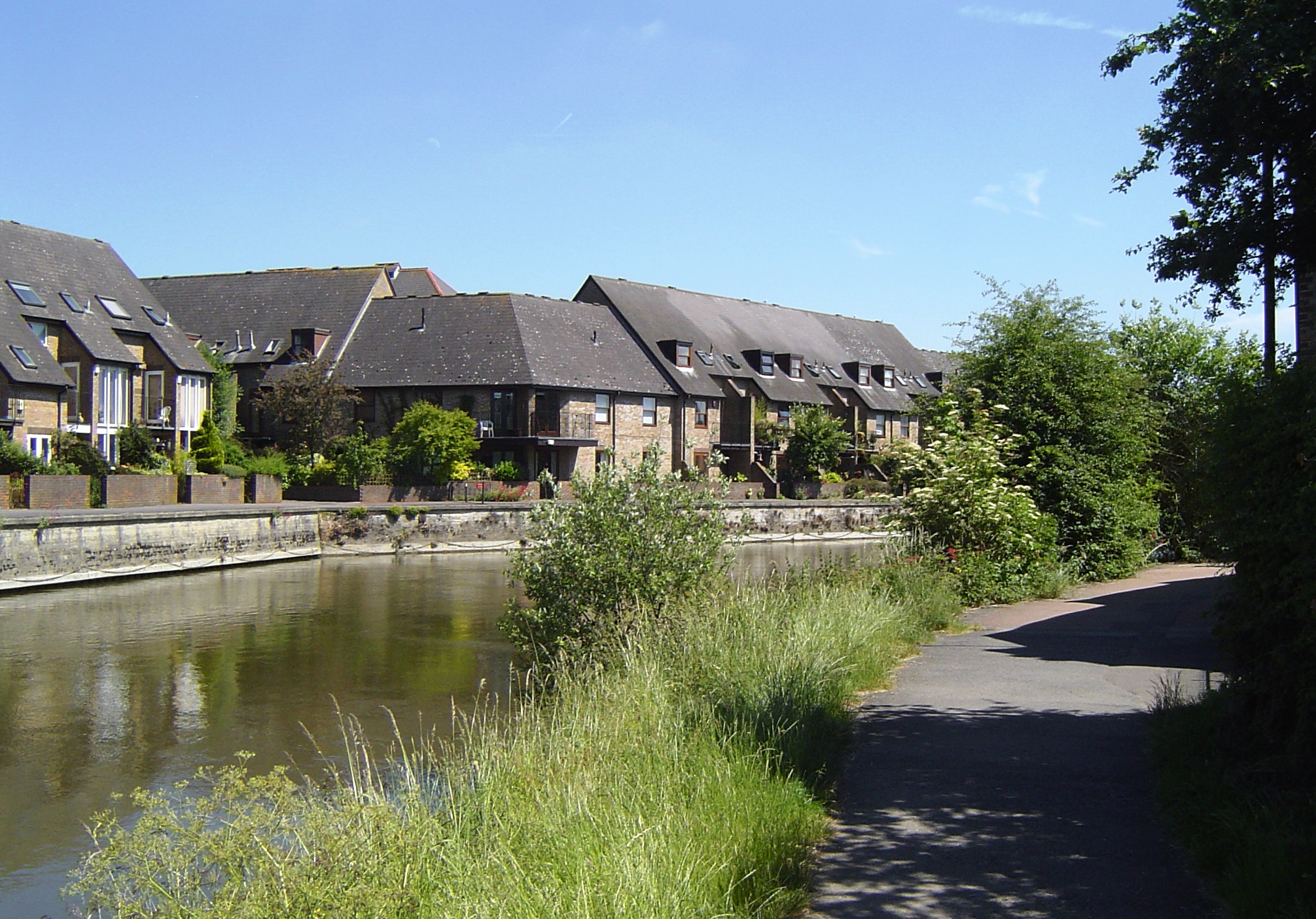
Housing above Folly Bridge

The river at this point and around Oxford in general is sometimes known as the Isis. Donnington Bridge crosses the river upstream of the lock and then the River Cherwell joins the Thames on the northern side. Boathouses of Oxford University colleges line the bank on the northern side, followed by Christ Church Meadow. This upstream stretch of the river is used for rowing, and is the location of the University rowing regattas of Torpids and Summer Eights. After Christ Church Meadow is Folly Bridge where are the landing stages for pleasure boats. After Folly Bridge, the river runs through suburbs where it is crossed by Grandpont Bridge. Beyond this is the Gasworks Bridge, a converted railway bridge, and the Osney Rail Bridge.

The Thames Path stays on the western side towards South Hinksey until it reaches Osney Lock.

== See also ==
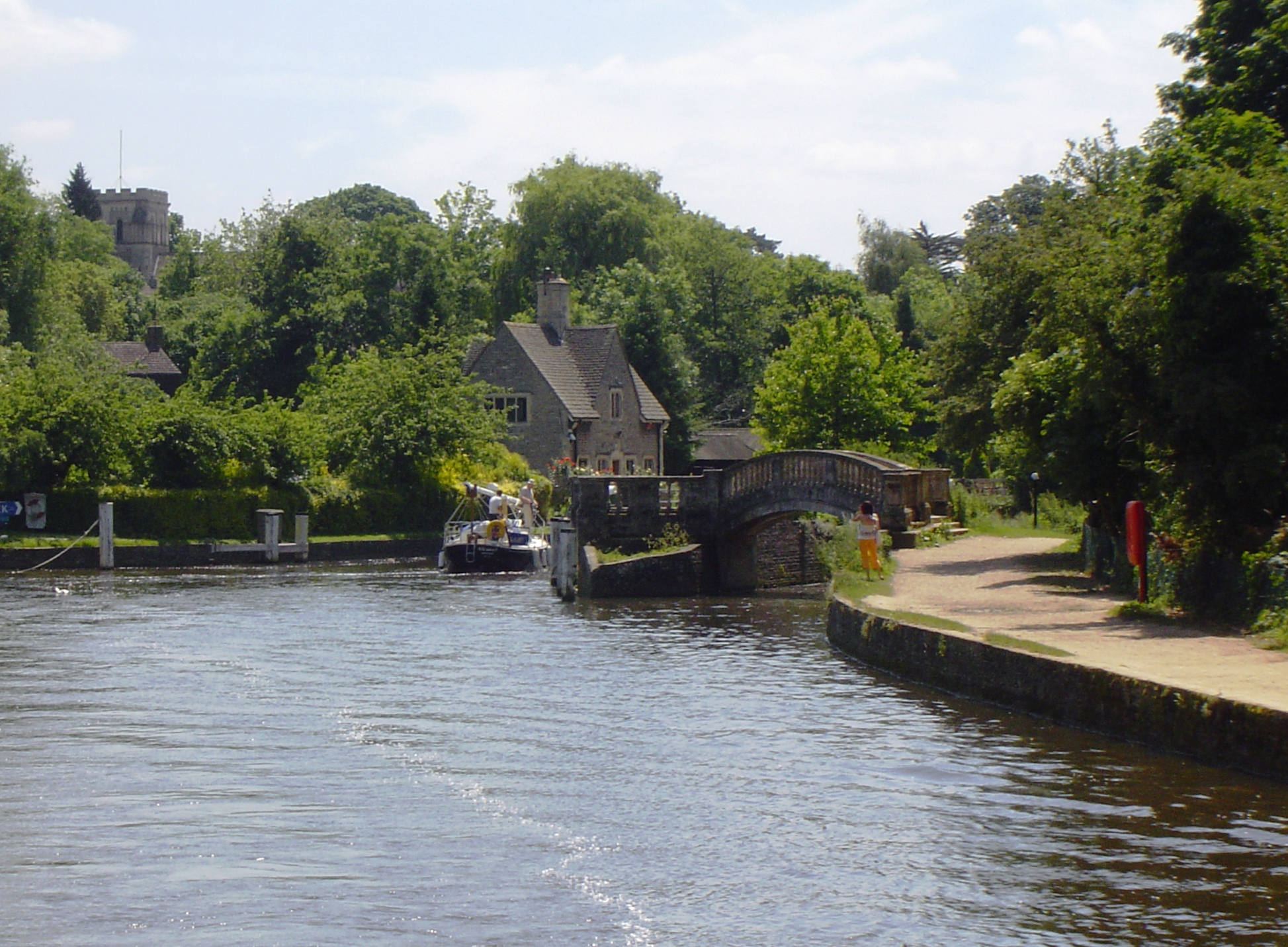
The lock from upstream

- Locks on the River Thames
- Rowing on the River Thames
- Crossings of the River Thames

Next crossing upstream	River Thames	Next crossing downstream
Donnington Bridge (road)	Iffley Lock	Isis Bridge (road)
Next lock upstream	River Thames	Next lock downstream
Osney Lock; 3.73 km (2.32 mi)	Iffley Lock; Grid reference: SP525036	Sandford Lock; 2.70 km (1.68 mi)
