= Donnington Bridge Road =

Road in south Oxford, England

Coordinates: 51.7372°N 1.2375°W

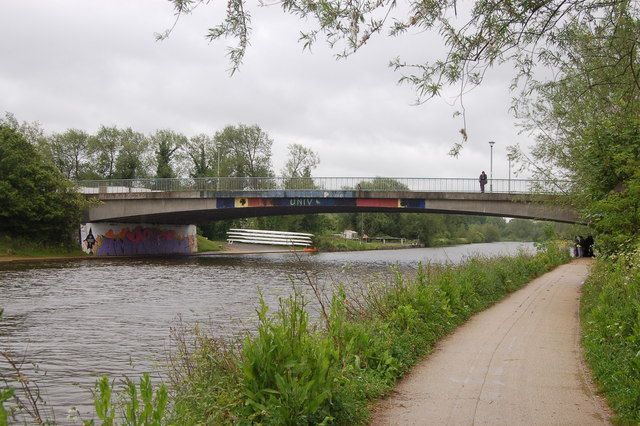
Donnington Bridge, forming part of Donnington Bridge Road

Donnington Bridge Road is a road in south Oxford, England, in the estate of Donnington.

The road starts at Iffley Road and continues until it becomes Weirs Lane, which ends up at Abingdon Road. It forms part of the B4495 road and is named after Donnington Bridge, a bridge over the River Thames constructed in the 1960s.

Donnington Bridge Road is a major destination for Oxford in terms of sports on the River Thames. It is home to the City of Oxford Rowing Club, a rowing club situated near the junction with Meadow Lane on the southern side of Donnington Bridge, and on the eastern bank of the River Isis (the local name for the Thames). On the northern side, there is a Riverside Centre which has a sea cadets club and offers rowing, canoeing, kayaking and rockclimbing for teenagers.

== History ==
According to some sources, a ford was located in the area, sometimes named 'Stanford' (meaning stone ford) on a Roman road called Port Way, which ran southwest to northeast. It is believed that this is one of the fords which gave Oxford its name.

In 1954, Donnington Bridge was proposed in the place of a ferry that previously took vehicles over the Isis.

On 22 October 1962, it was officially opened by Viscount Hailsham. His connections with Oxford include being an undergraduate at Christ Church and an MP for Oxford City.

In the summer of 2007, Donnington Bridge Road was the site of deep floods which hit most of the country at the time. This area is especially prone to flooding due to its proximity to the River Isis, and some houses are situated at lower points than the river.
