= Donnington Bridge =

Bridge in Oxfordshire, United Kingdom

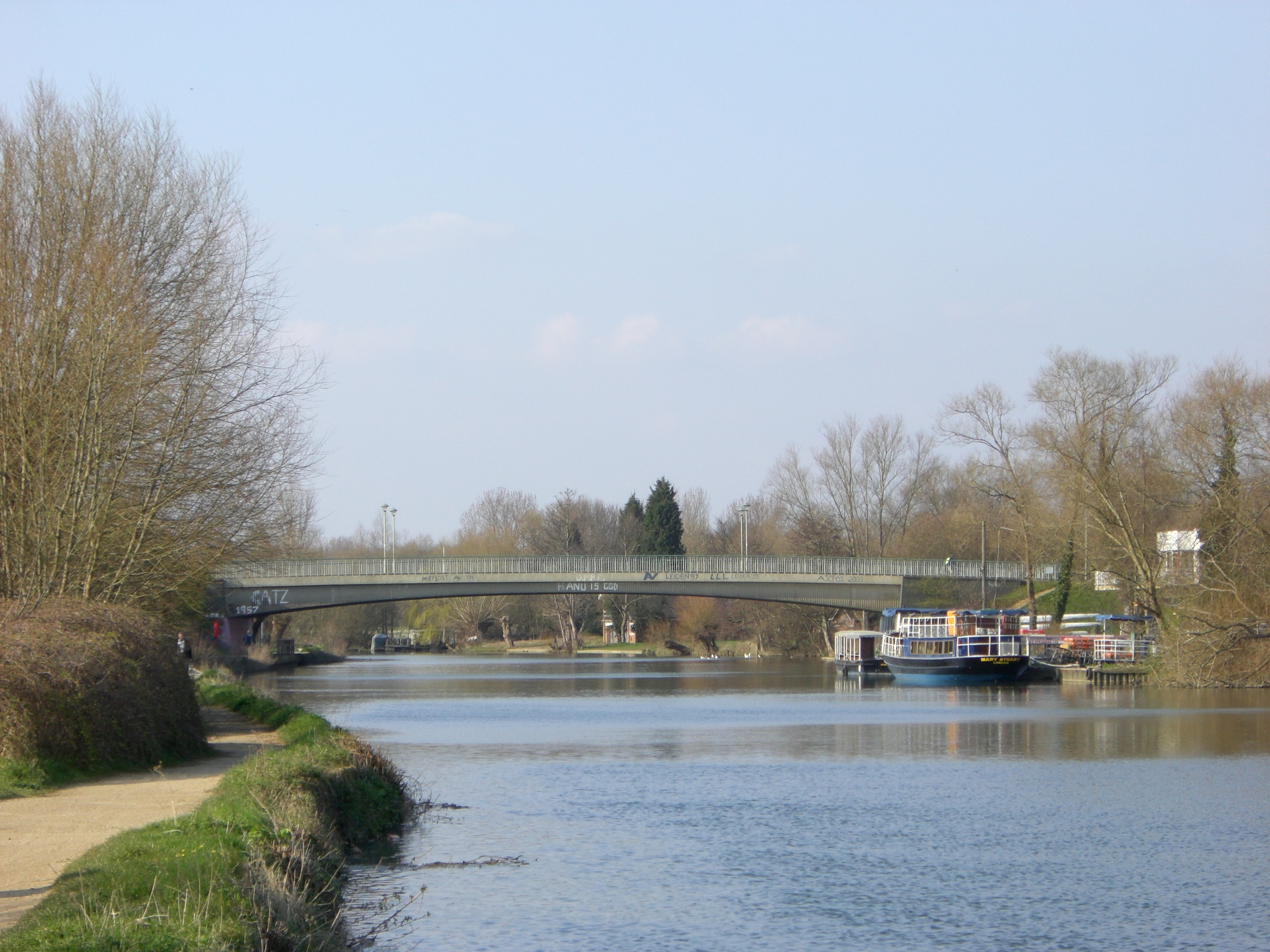
- Donnington Bridge, seen from the south.
- Coordinates: 51°44′08″N 1°14′31.5″W
- Crosses: River Thames
- Locale: Oxford

Characteristics
- Design: Arch
- Material: Concrete
- Width: 56 feet 8 inches (17.27 m)
- Height: 16 feet 6 inches (5.03 m)
- Longest span: 170 feet (52 m)
- No. of spans: 1

History
- Designer: Travers Morgan and Partners
- Opened: 1962

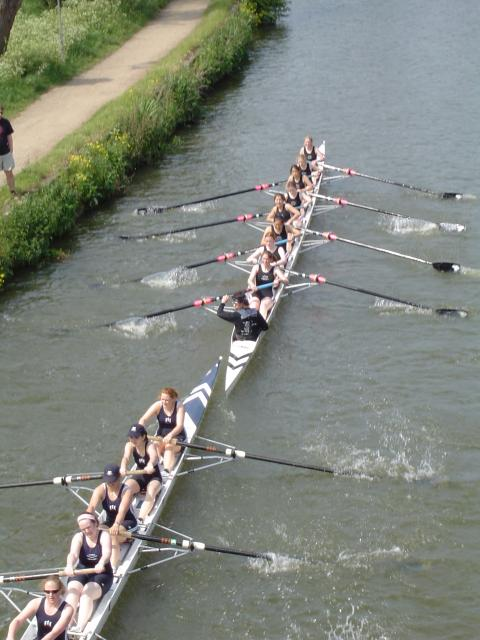
A view looking north from Donnington Bridge of a rowing bump (Oriel catching Magdalen) at Eights Week (2005).

Donnington Bridge is a modern road bridge (completed in 1962) over the River Thames, in the south of the city of Oxford, England. At this point the river is commonly called the Isis. The bridge carries the B4495 road (Donnington Bridge Road) from Abingdon Road to Iffley Road. It crosses the river on the reach between Iffley Lock and Osney Lock.

== Design ==
Donnington Bridge has a single arch span of 52 metres (170 ft) between supports and an overall width of 17.27 metres (56 ft 8 in). It is constructed of reinforced concrete deck slab cast integrally with 10 pre-stressed concrete legs triangulated to meet the hinges enclosed within the abutments. The abutments are clad externally with precast concrete units faced with Criggion Green and Blue Shap stone and the fascias of the bridge are calcined flint.

== History ==
A free ferry linked East Oxford and South Oxford until 1937, when a concrete footbridge was built.

Early in 1954 Oxford City Council revived a proposal to construct a new road to link Iffley Road and Abingdon Road which would cross the Thames near Donnington Lane. Various routes were considered and in December 1954 the present line was approved. Although the Minister of Transport refused to provide financial assistance, the council decided to proceed with the scheme.

The design and roadworks and the overall administration of the scheme were undertaken by the City engineer J. Campbell Riddell. Travers Morgan and Partners were appointed as consultants for the design of the bridge itself and the backwater bridges.

As a result of a government credit squeeze, less than a week before contract documents were issued, the project had to be shelved until February 1960. The following June the contract in the sum of £309,903 16s 11d was awarded to The Cementation Company for the construction of the bridges and the new road and for the demolition of the free Ferry link foot bridge. The overall cost including improvements to the existing approach roads, street lighting, service diversions and landscaping, came to over £400,000.

Donnington Bridge was opened on 22 October 1962 by Viscount Hailsham who walked over the bridge. The Lord Mayor of Oxford, Evan Owen Roberts, was the first person to drive over the bridge. The 50th anniversary of the opening was commemorated in 2012.

== Activity ==
There is much rowing on the river by students of Oxford University, and members of the City of Oxford Rowing Club, between Iffley Lock downstream from this bridge and Folly Bridge further upstream. The start of Eights Week and Torpids is just south of Donnington Bridge, and the bridge is a good place to view the races because of its high vantage point. The area is also used to for Kayaking with organisation including The Riverside Centre, Falcon and Isis Canoe Club all based beside the bridge.

== See also ==
- Crossings of the River Thames
- Christ Church Meadow

Next crossing upstream	River Thames	Next crossing downstream
Folly Bridge (road)	Donnington Bridge	Iffley Lock (pedestrian)
