= Salters Steamers =

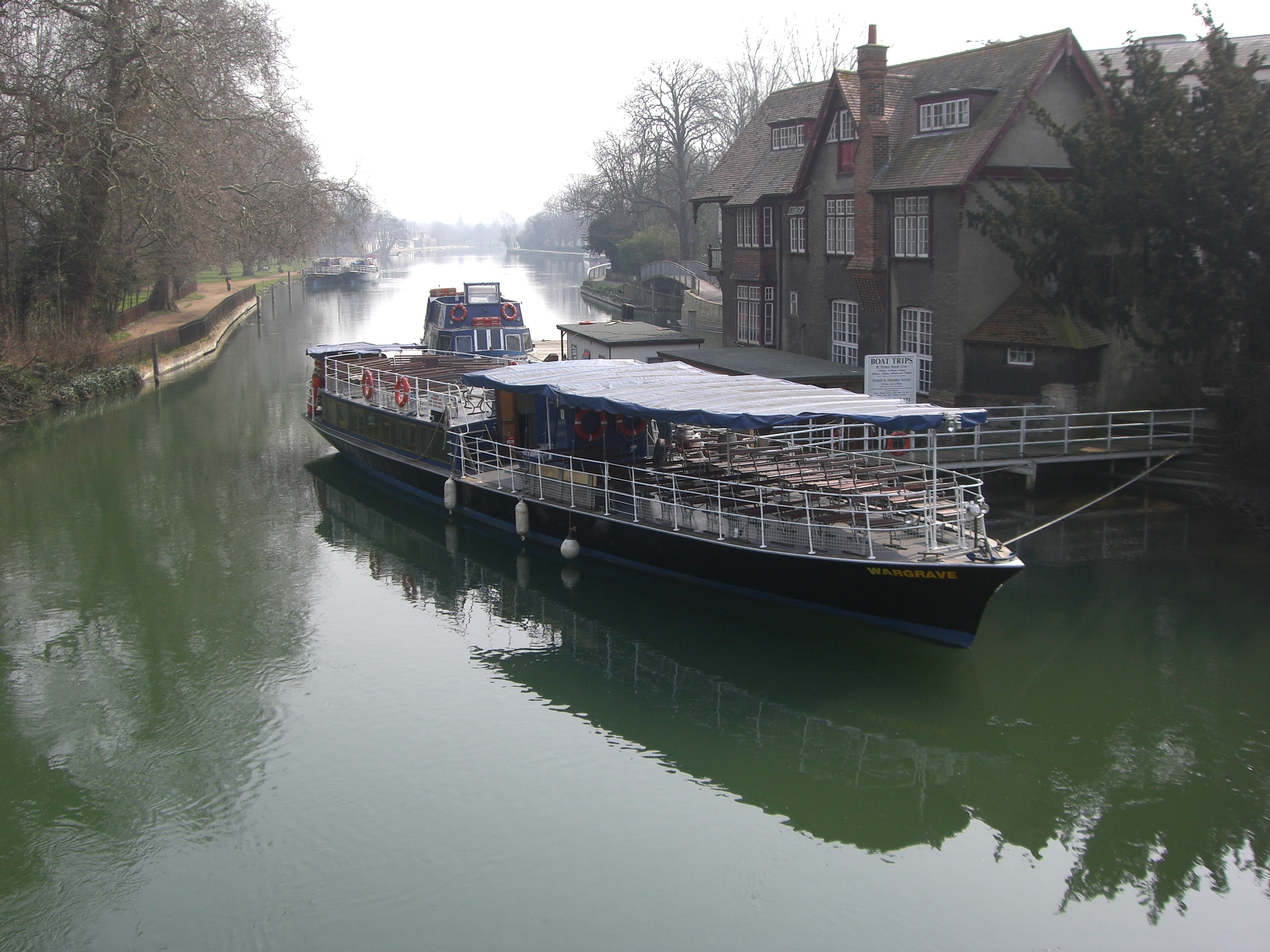
Salters boat Wargrave next to Folly Bridge, Oxford.

Salters Steamers, formerly known as Salter Bros, is a family boating firm on the River Thames, founded in Oxford in 1858. Prior to that the family operated a riverside tavern in Wandsworth, having moved there around 1836. The company runs passenger services in summer along the length of the River Thames between Oxford and Staines. They also hire boats from Oxford (at Folly Bridge), Reading, Henley-on-Thames and Windsor. In Oxford in particular, punts are available.

== History ==
The firm was established when John and Stephen Salter took over Isaac King's boat building firm based at Folly Bridge in Oxford. They were the country's leading racing-boat-builder in the 1860s (distributing craft around the world) and they built many of the beautiful Oxford University barges at Christ Church Meadow, used over many years as a base for the various colleges for the sport of rowing. These have now all been replaced by boat houses. They became one of the largest inland boat-letters in the country by the late 1880s and in the twentieth century they built many pleasure craft for corporations and councils around the country.

On the death of John Salter, the firm passed to his three sons (John, James and George) and become known as Salter Bros. John and James rose to considerable prominence in Oxford as long-standing local Liberal politicians (both serving as Mayors of Oxford) and well-known Wesleyan Methodists. In 1888, the company started a steam boat service between Oxford and Kingston upon Thames, using the boat Alaska. Alaska was built in 1883 as a private vessel but was purchased in 1886 by Salters who used her from 1888 to start their Oxford to Kingston return service. Alaska is still operating today under the management of Thames Steamers Limited. By the turn of the century the firm was the largest passenger boat operator on the non-tidal Thames, helped by its close association with the Great Western Railway with which it ran numerous circular tours.

The service between Oxford and Kingston operated until the 1970s. The return journey originally took five days (two days downstream and three days upstream), but was shortened to four in the 1890s. When the through service became uneconomic the company concentrated on local services between Folly Bridge, Oxford and Abingdon, Reading and Henley, Marlow and Windsor and Windsor and Staines.

The firm was one of the most important businesses on the river for popularising pleasure boating on the non-tidal Thames. It is still owned and run by family members (the fifth and sixth generation), but the parent company is now primarily concerned with property management.

== Current services ==
More recently, Salters passenger services have been reintroduced between Abingdon, Wallingford and Reading, and between Henley and Marlow. Through journeys are therefore again possible, with changes of boats. The journey between Oxford and Staines takes 4 days.

== Original steamer ==
Two original 'Salters Steamers' have been restored to full working order as a steam-powered excursion trip boats working from Runnymede and Windsor, on the Thames. The SL Nuneham, built by Edwin Clarke in 1898 and the SL Streatley, built by Salters in Oxford in 1905, which retains her original triple expansion engine.
