= Grandpont Bridge =

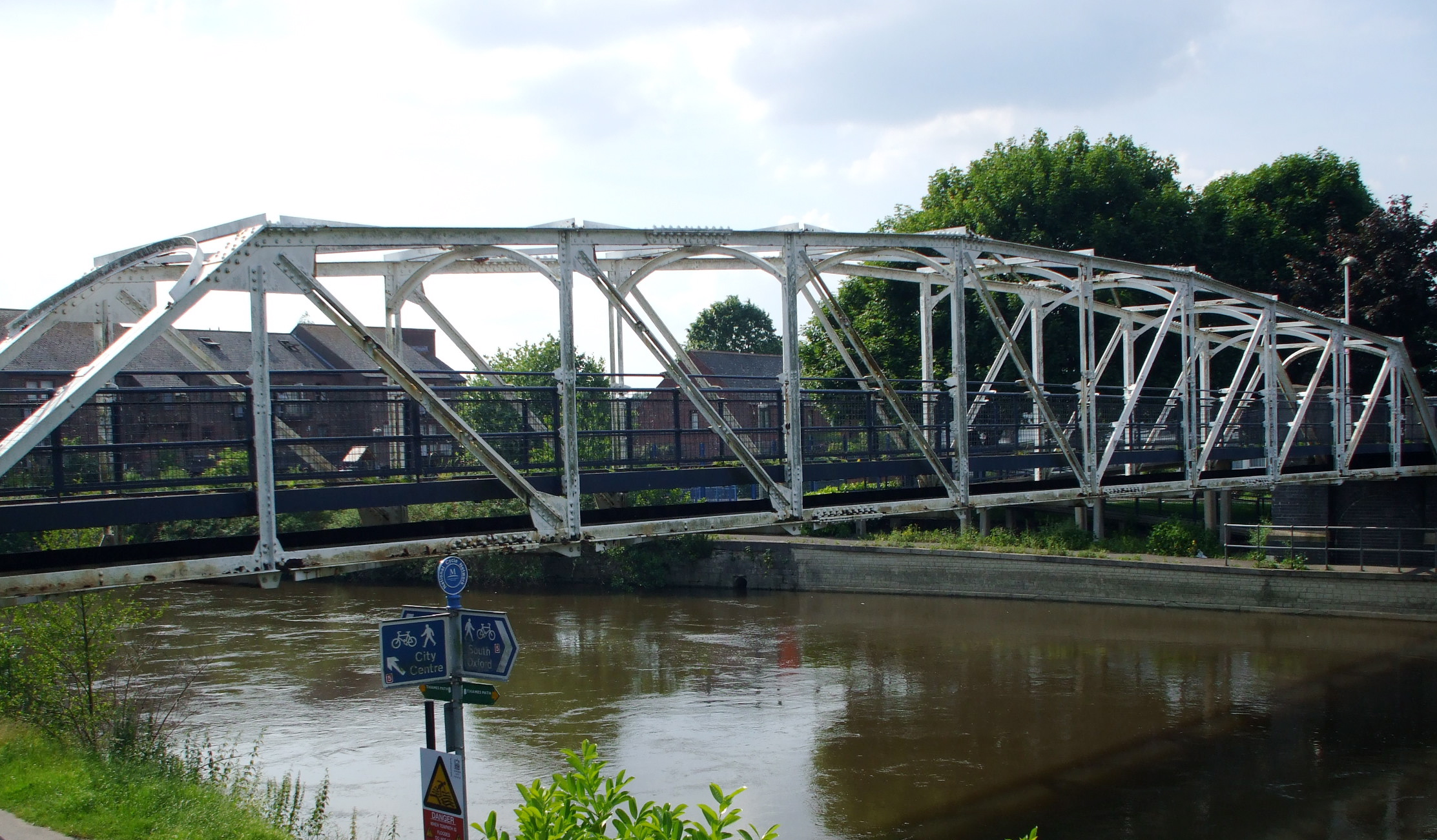
- Coordinates: 51.747134°N 1.260942°W
- Carries: Footpath, Cycleway
- Crosses: River Thames
- Locale: Oxford

Characteristics
- Material: Iron
- Height: 12 feet 0 inches (3.66 m)

History
- Closed: March 2021 (Temporary)

Location
- Interactive map of Grandpont Bridge

Grandpont Bridge is a footbridge across the River Thames near the centre of Oxford, England that was temporarily closed in March 2021. It links Friars Wharf in St Ebbes on the north bank to the Geoffrey Arthur Building of Pembroke College, built in 1990, and the Grandpont area. It crosses the Thames on the reach between Iffley Lock and Osney Lock.

The bridge was also used by cyclists. It lies on the Hanson Way, part of National Cycle Network route 5.

The Environment Agency refers to the bridge as "Grandpont Bridge". Other sources also call the bridge "Oxford footbridge", and "Gasworks Pipe Bridge", the name being for the town gas, chiefly methane, produced by the treatment of coal and its less congealed coke form in particular.

The bridge was built in the 1930s. The bridge only carried a utility pipe and lacked a walkway in 1977. Following a survey which revealed a danger of collapse, it was closed to traffic in March 2021. A contractor was appointed to fix the bridge in April 2023, with works scheduled to be complete by October 2023. The works were eventually completed in December 2024.

The bridge takes its name from Grandpont, the area south of the bridge, which itself takes its name from a much earlier bridge-causeway which included the next bridge downstream, now known as Folly Bridge.

== See also ==
- Crossings of the River Thames

Next crossing upstream	River Thames	Next crossing downstream
Gasworks Bridge (pedestrian)	Grandpont Bridge	Folly Bridge (road)
