= Grandpont =

Area of Oxford, England

Coordinates: 51.745°N 1.263°W

- Location within Oxfordshire
- OS grid reference: SP510053
- Civil parish: unparished
- District: Oxford
- Shire county: Oxfordshire
- Region: South East
- Country: England
- Sovereign state: United Kingdom
- Post town: Oxford
- Postcode district: OX1
- Dialling code: 01865
- Police: Thames Valley
- Fire: Oxfordshire
- Ambulance: South Central
- UK Parliament: Oxford East
- Website: Oxford City Council

Grandpont is a mainly residential area in south Oxford, England. It is west of Abingdon Road, and consists mainly of narrow streets that run at right angles to the main road, with terraced late-Victorian and Edwardian houses.

It also contains the Grandpont Nature Park—a riverside park managed by Oxford City Council (grid reference SP510054). The park covers 7.4 acres (3 ha) and was created in 1985 on the site of a gas works that was demolished in 1960. The former railway bridge, used to carry coal from the main railway line across the River Thames to the older gas works in St Ebbes on the north bank, still stands, and is in use as a footbridge. A later bridge, Grandpont Bridge, provides a more direct pedestrian and cycle route across the river to St Ebbes.

== History ==
The name of the area derives from the Grandpont, a medieval stone causeway now known to survive within the core of the modern Abingdon Road for a distance of at least 700 metres south of the city centre. The causeway may have been first built in the Anglo-Saxon era, and rebuilt in the late 11th century by the first Norman lord of Oxford, Robert D'Oyly I, crossing the low-lying ground south of the City, still very liable to winter flooding from the nearby River Thames.

In 1279 there were 62 houses in Grandpont. The suburb grew slowly in the following centuries, and extensive development did not take place until the 19th century. In 1844 the Great Western Railway opened Oxford's first railway station in what is now Western Road, and that stimulated development. One of the houses built there is Grandpont House named after the neighbourhood. Built for Sir William Elias Taunton, the Town Clerk of the city of Oxford, in 1785, his family controlled the house until Brasenose College acquired the house in 1847. Brasenose maintained the house until 1959 when it was purchased by the Netherhall Educational Association.

Until 1889 Grandpont was in Berkshire, although it was a tithing of the parish of St Aldate's, Oxford. The area was added to the municipal borough of Oxford and to Oxfordshire in 1889. The Church of England parish church of Saint Matthew, Grandpont was built in 1890, presumably as a chapel of ease. The church was consecrated by Bishop William Stubbs on Thursday October 29, 1891. It became a parish separate from St Aldate's in 1913.

== Sources ==
- Eleanor Chance; Christina Colvin; Janet Cooper; C.J. Day; T.G. Hassall; Nesta Selwyn (1979). Alan Crossley; C.R. Elrington (eds.). A History of the County of Oxford, Volume 4. Victoria County History. Victoria County History.
- Hibbert, Christoper, ed. (1988). The Encyclopaedia of Oxford. London: Macmillan Publishers. ISBN 0-333-39917-X.
- Sherwood, Jennifer; Pevsner, Nikolaus (1974). Oxfordshire. The Buildings of England. Harmondsworth: Penguin Books. p. 335. ISBN 0-14-071045-0.
