= Redbridge, Oxford =

Coordinates: 51.729°N 1.249°W

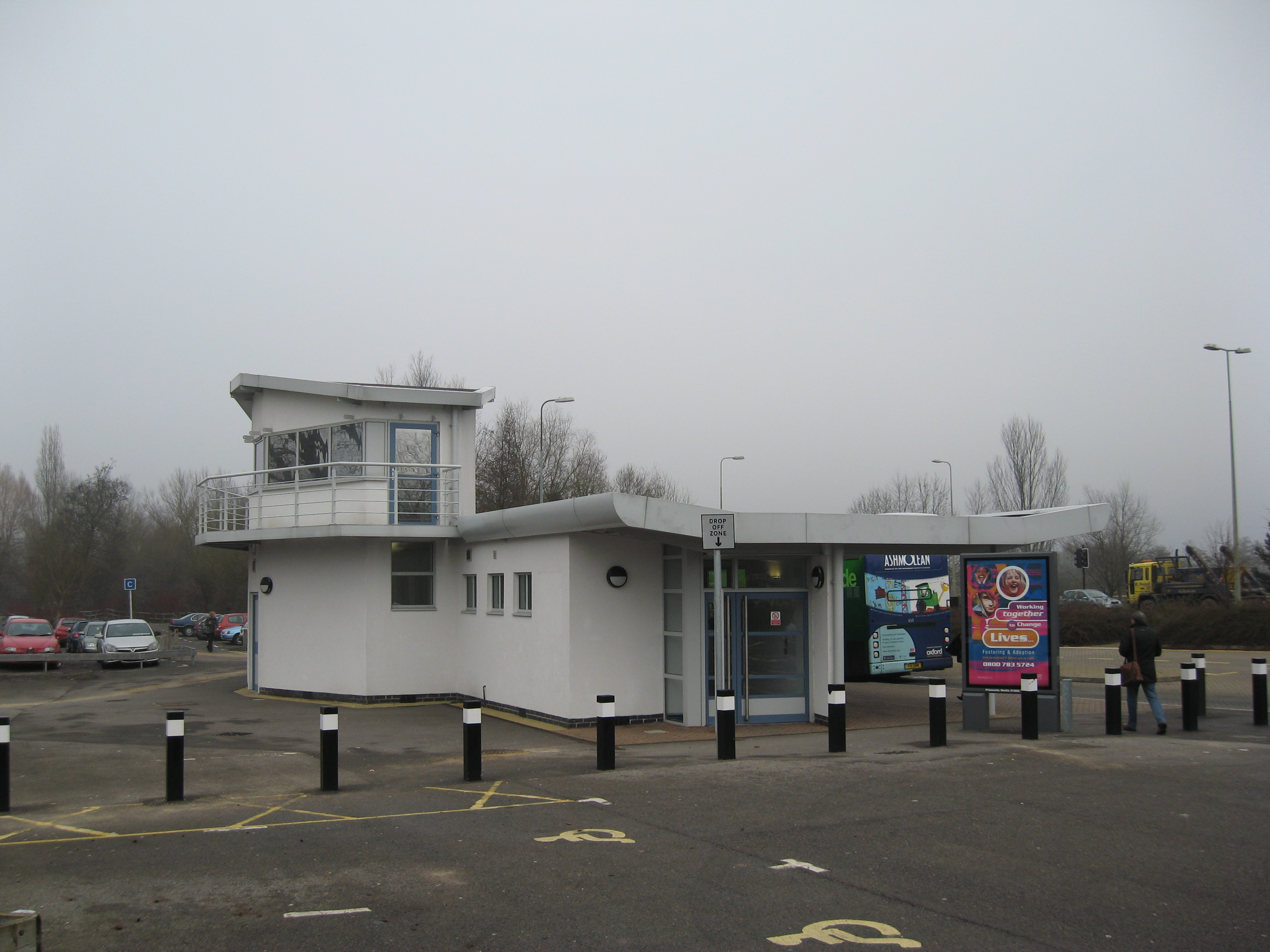
Redbridge Park and Ride Bus Station, Oxford

Redbridge is located in south Oxford, England, at the southern end of Abingdon Road near the Oxford Ring Road and the A34. Redbridge takes its name from a brick bridge, locally known as the Red Bridge, which carries Old Abingdon Road over the Cherwell Valley railway line.

Redbridge Recycling Centre, located on Old Abingdon Road, is operated by Oxfordshire County Council.

Redbridge Park and Ride Car Park is operated by Oxford City Council. A park and ride bus service operates to the centre of Oxford. In 2016, a recycling transfer station at the car park was announced. The park&ride has a 50 MW / 50 MWh lithium-ion battery and a 5 MWh flow battery combined in a grid battery, along with 22 fast electric vehicle chargers, connecting to the 400 kV Cowley substation. The battery supplies grid services.

== See also ==
- A4144 road
