= Gasworks Bridge =

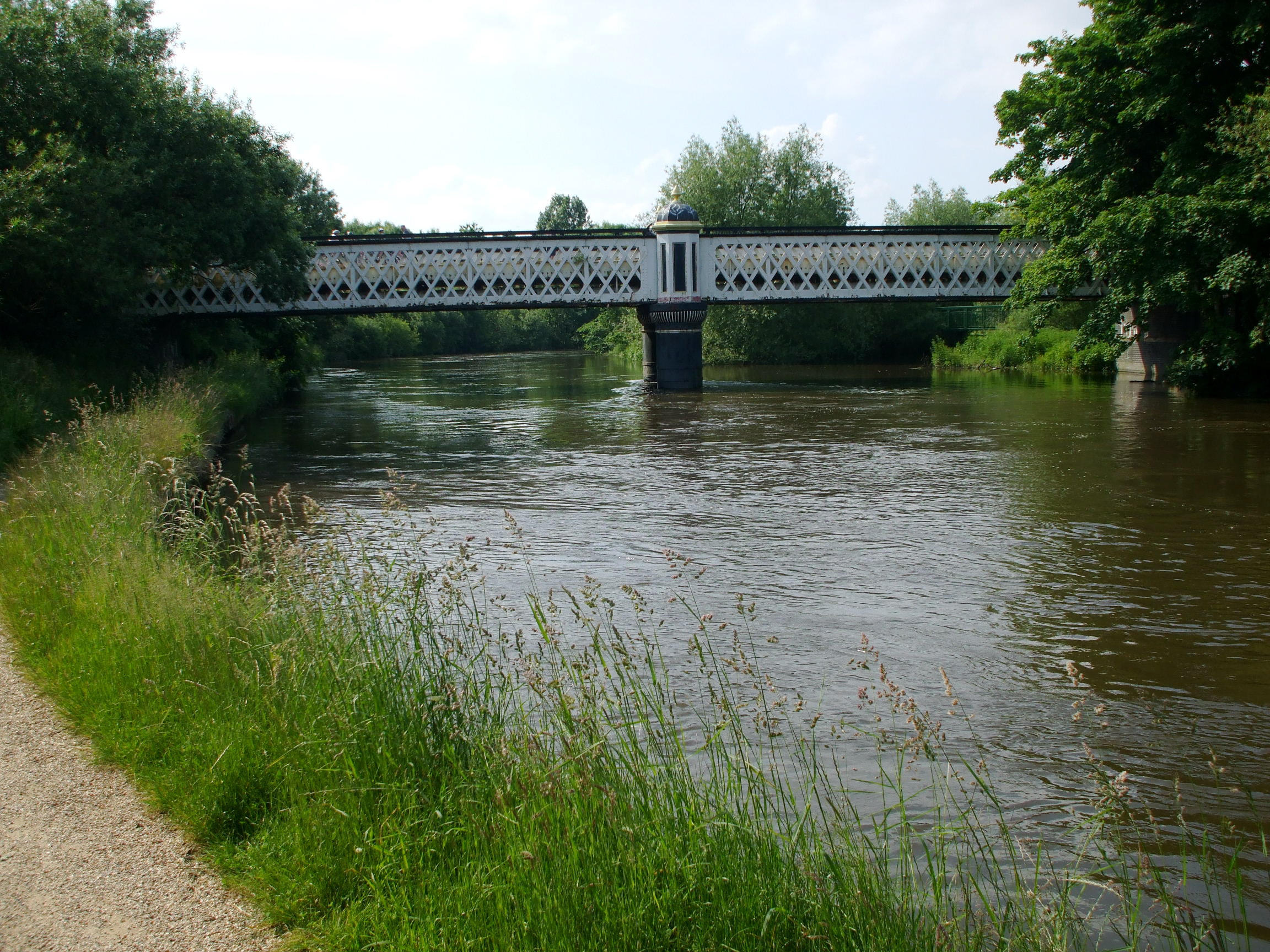
- Coordinates: 51.746252°N 1.263636°W
- Carries: Footpath
- Crosses: River Thames
- Locale: Oxford

Characteristics
- Material: Iron
- Height: 12 feet 2 inches (3.71 m)
- No. of spans: 2
- Piers in water: 1

History
- Opened: 1886

Location
- Interactive map of Gasworks Bridge

The Gasworks Bridge, also known as the Old Gasworks Bridge, is an iron bridge across the River Thames at Oxford in England. It is a pedestrian bridge linking St Ebbes to the Grandpont nature reserve. It crosses the river on the reach between Iffley Lock and Osney Lock.

The bridge was constructed by the Oxford and District Gas Company in 1886 for a short railway branch line to carry coal to the gas works from the main Cherwell Valley Line at a junction just south of Osney Rail Bridge. The bridge was built by assembling sections on the south bank of the river and floating them into position. The gas works was demolished in 1960; no evidence of the railway line is visible on the footbridge.

Since the demolition of the gas works, other names have been used for the bridge. For a few years after the closure of the railway it appears to have been crossed by a private road, and the Environment Agency refers to the bridge simply as "Road Bridge", although no road now crosses it. The bridge is now usually referred to by its old name. It has occasionally been referred to as Osney Footbridge, although the bridge is some distance from Osney, and that name is also used for a different bridge.

== See also ==
- Crossings of the River Thames

Next crossing upstream	River Thames	Next crossing downstream
Osney Rail Bridge (railway)	Gasworks Bridge	Grandpont Bridge (pedestrian)
