= Folly Bridge =

Road bridge in Oxford, England

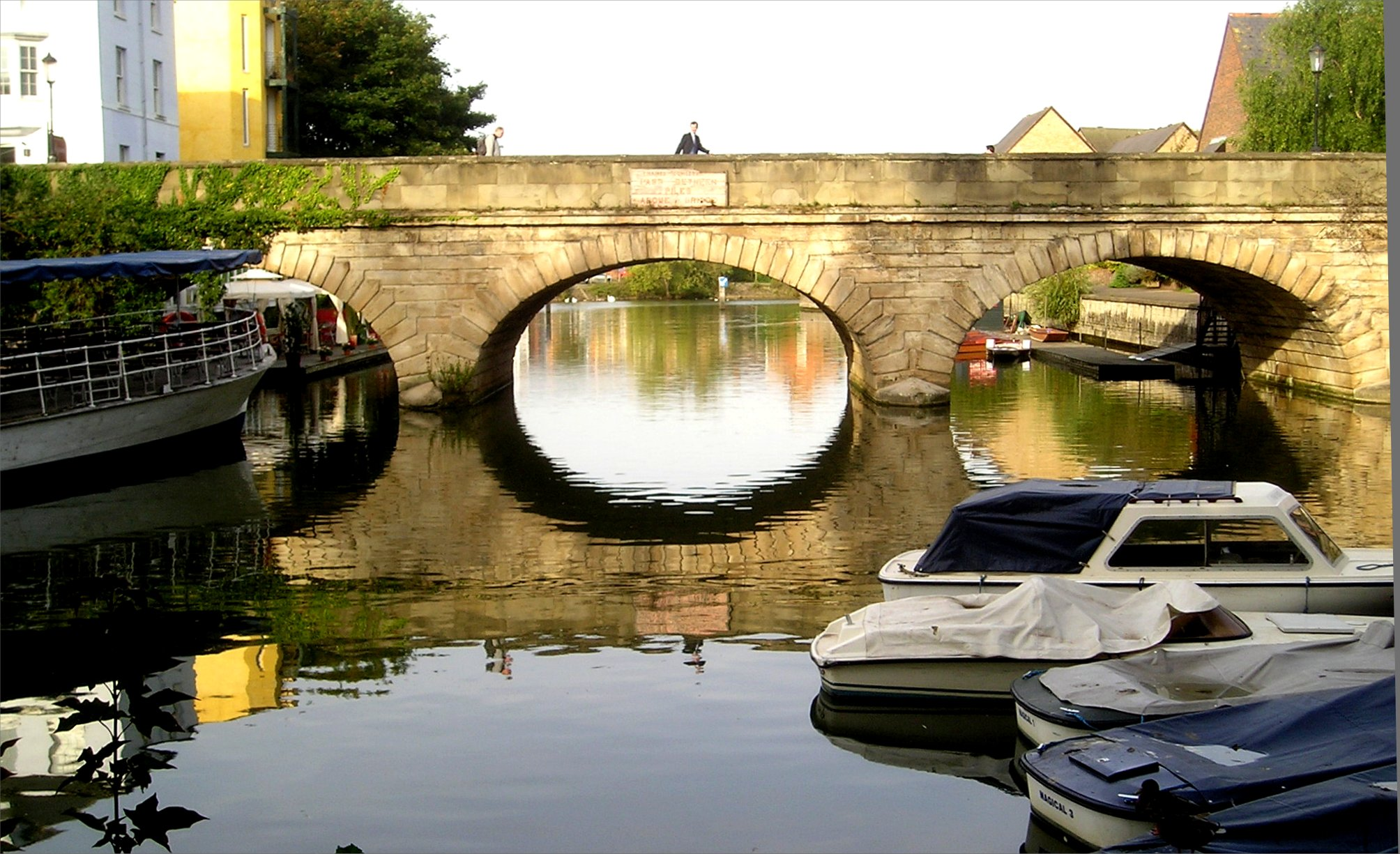
- Folly Bridge from downstream.
- Coordinates: 51.746027°N 1.256542°W
- Crosses: River Thames
- Locale: Oxford
- Heritage status: Grade II listed

Characteristics
- Material: Stone
- Height: 10 feet 3 inches (3.12 m)
- No. of spans: 3
- Piers in water: 2

History
- Designer: Ebenezer Perry
- Opened: 1827

Location
- Interactive map of Folly Bridge

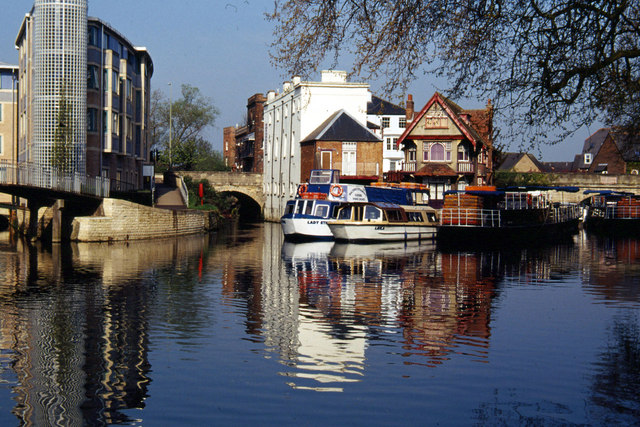
View of Folly Bridge and the island from downstream.

Folly Bridge is a stone bridge over the River Thames carrying the Abingdon Road south from the centre of Oxford, England. It was erected in 1825–27, to designs of a little-known architect, Ebenezer Perry (died 1850), who practised in London.

The bridge is in two parts separated by an island. The origin of the name is uncertain although it has been suggested that it originated about 1650 after a tenant of Friar Bacon's study.

== History ==
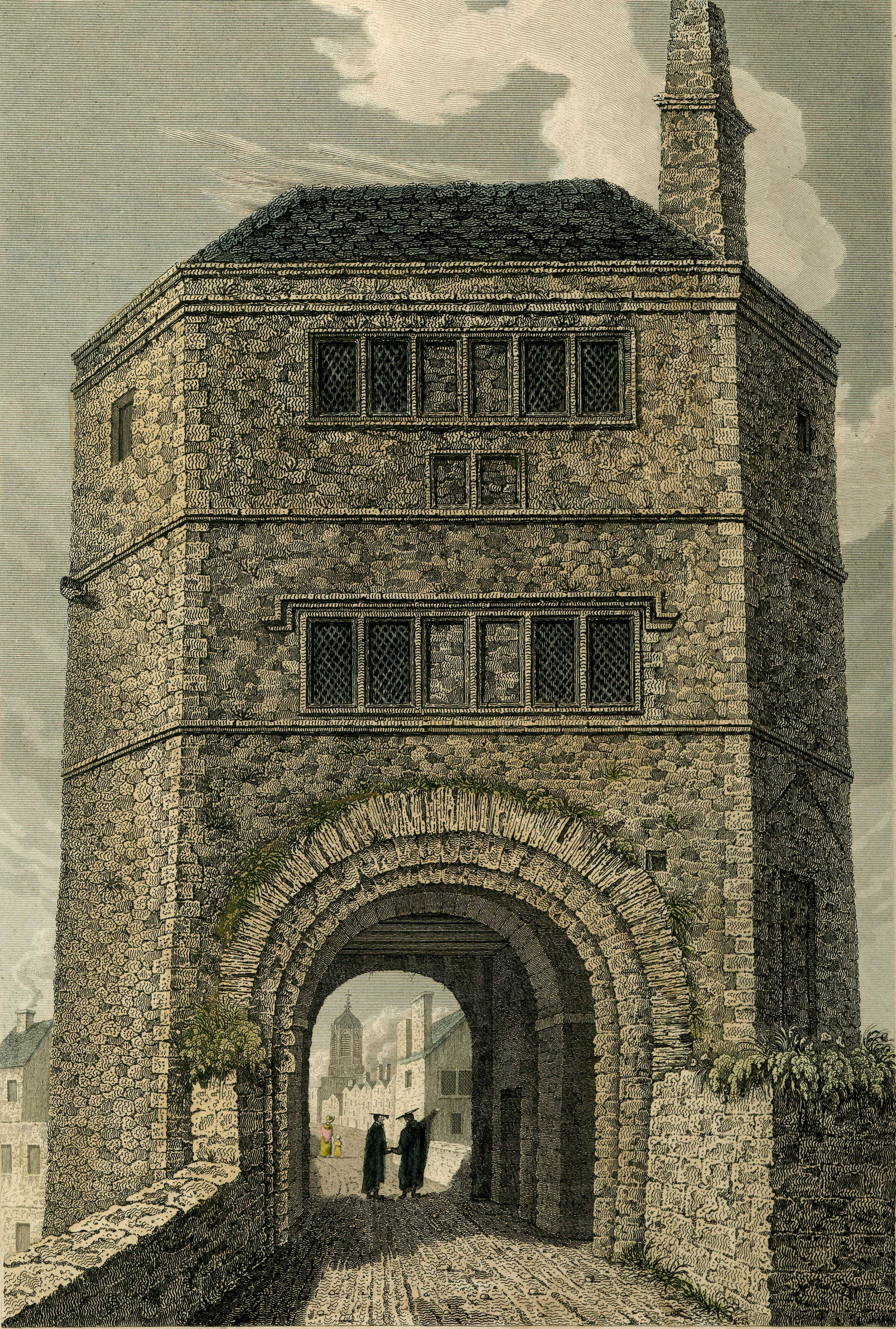
The old "Friar Bacon's Study"

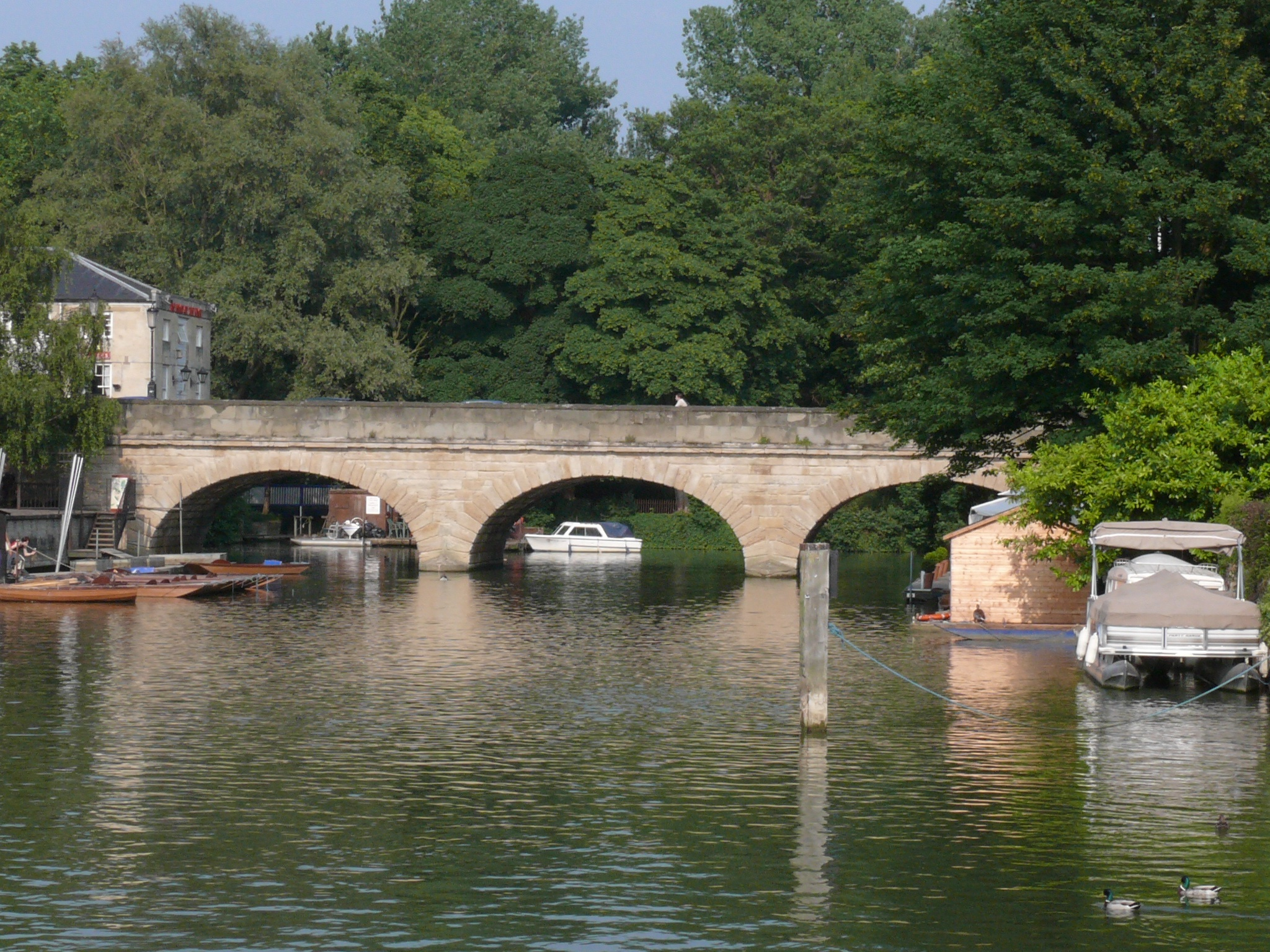
"Grand Pont" from upstream

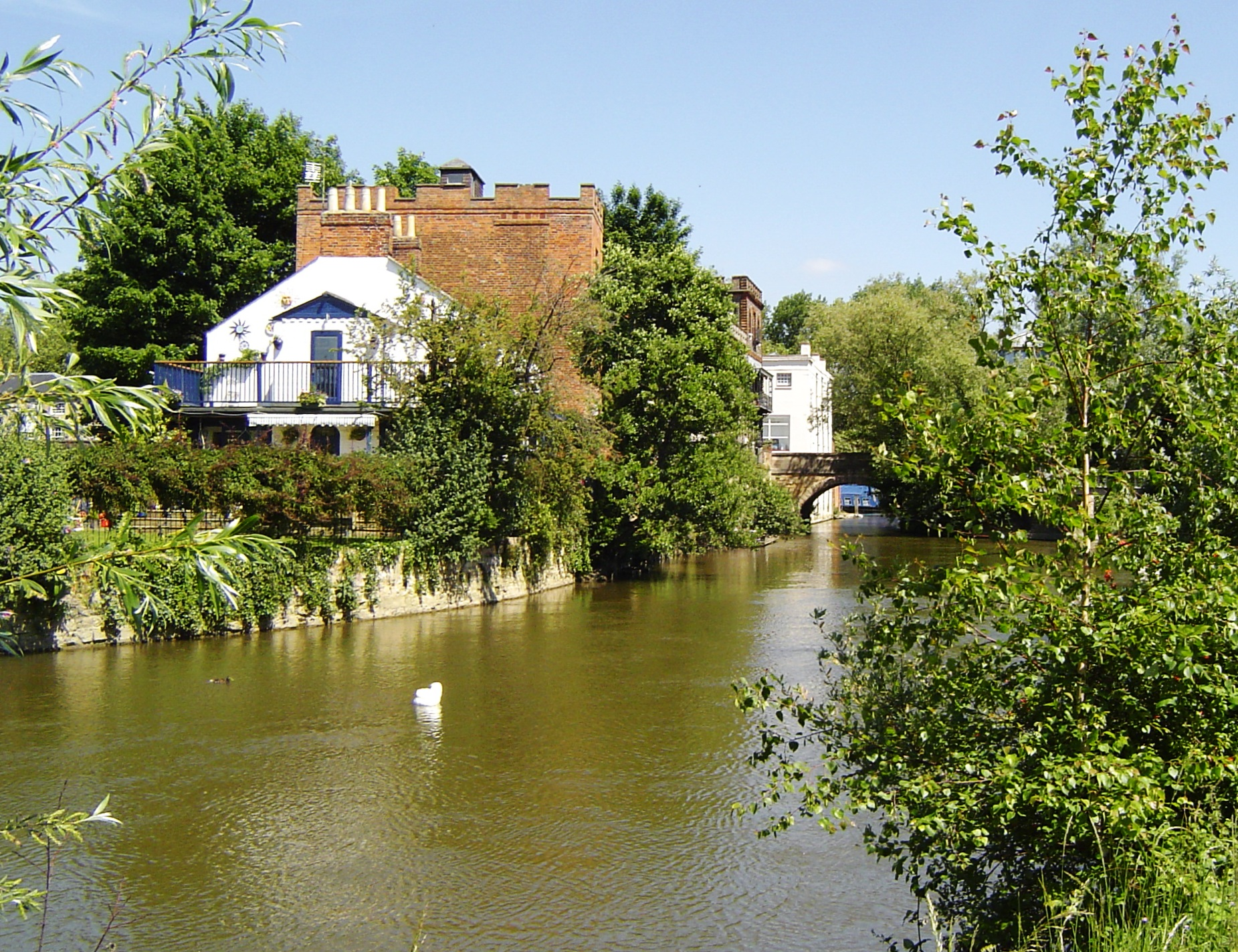
The island and "South Bridge" from upstream

The bridge apparently stands at the site of the ford over which oxen could be driven across the Isis, the ancient name of the Thames in the Oxford area. The first known stone bridge on the site was built by Robert d'Oilli around 1085, but it is believed there was a wooden bridge in the time of Ethelred of Wessex.

Until the late 17th century the bridge was known as South Bridge, and formed part of a long causeway known as Grandpont, which stretched along most of the line of Abingdon Road. In the 13th century, the alchemist Roger Bacon lived and worked at "Friar Bacon's Study" which stood across the north end of the bridge until 1779, when it was removed to widen the road. Samuel Pepys visited Bacon's study in 1669, noting: "So to Friar Bacon's study: I up and saw it, and gave the man 1s". In 1369, when there was a grant of pontage on "Grauntpount", the structure was said to be "so dangerous as to be well nigh impassable".

A toll-booth gateway tower used to straddle the approach to the bridge, which was on the Abingdon to Banbury turnpike. The former bridge and "Bacon's Tower" were drawn by many artists, including the twelve-year-old J. M. W. Turner.

There was also a weir underneath the bridge which had a flash lock and later a "pen" lock. At the beginning of the 19th century this and the poor state of the bridge itself constituted a problem for navigation. Surveys discovered that the foundations were in a very bad state, and Folly Bridge, Oxford, Rebuilding Act 1815 (55 Geo. 3. c. xciv) was obtained to rebuild the bridge and remove the "Tackle and Works" underneath. The new bridge works were begun in 1824 and completed in 1827. A pound lock was established nearby in about 1832, which was removed in 1884. The bridge is Grade I listed.

The toll house was rebuilt in 1844 and is now, along with the bridge, also Grade II listed; tolls on the bridge were abolished in 1850. A scheme for a public footbridge next to the bridge was designed by Nicholas Grimshaw & Partners but was not built.

== Environs ==
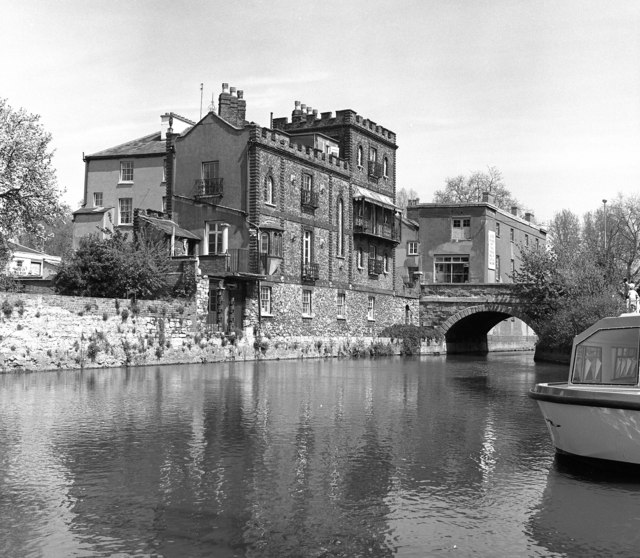
Castellated house at Folly Bridge (in 1979). The house was built in 1849 for the accountant and money-lender Joshua Cardwell.

Robert Gunther, the historian of science, bought 5 Folly Bridge, an unusual castellated house by the bridge, in 1911. The house is embellished with statues and cast iron balconies on the outside. It is located on a small island in the middle of the Thames.

Salters Steamers are located near the bridge. Punts are available close to the bridge and Christ Church Meadow is just downstream. The Head of the River public house is next to the bridge to the northeast, with views of the bridge and river.

== Literature ==
Alice's Adventures in Wonderland originated as a story told on a boating trip which began at Folly Bridge.

The novel Folly Bridge: A Romantic Tale was written by David Leslie Murray and published in 1945. The 1970 book Last Boat to Folly Bridge was written by the sailor Eric C. Hiscock.

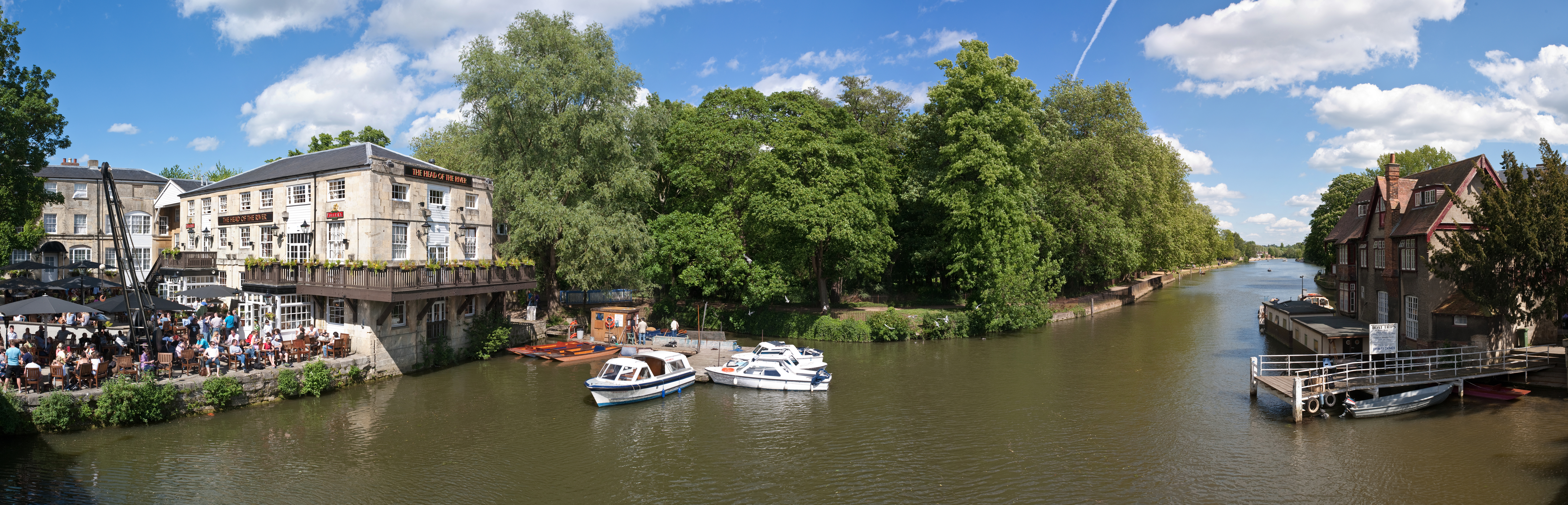
A panoramic view from Folly Bridge, looking downstream on the River Thames towards the Oxford University College boat houses.

== See also ==
- Crossings of the River Thames
- St Aldate's, to the north

Next crossing upstream	River Thames	Next crossing downstream
Grandpont Bridge	Folly Bridge; Grid reference SP5143805559	Donnington Bridge
