= William Elias Taunton =

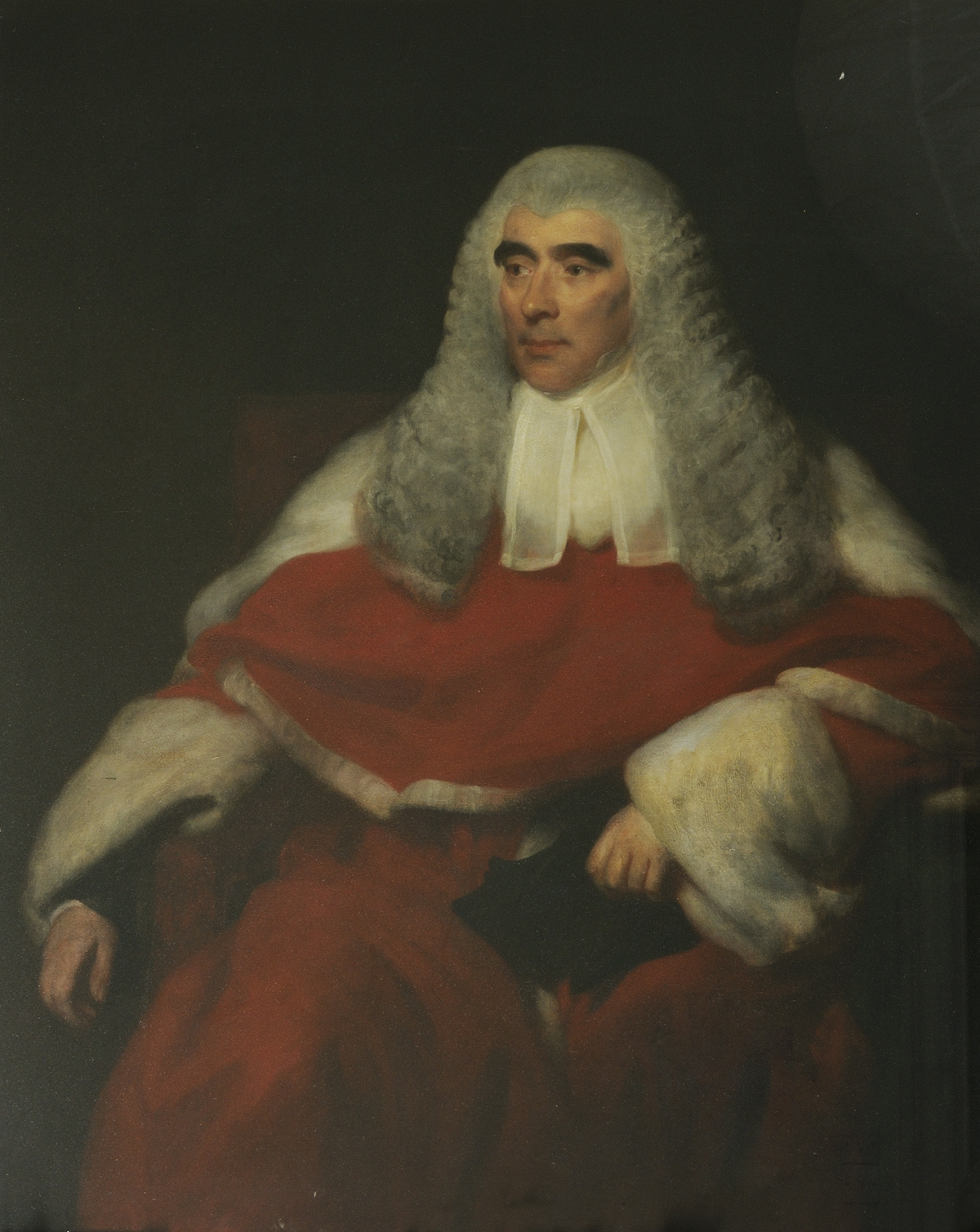

Sir William Elias Taunton (bapt. 28 September 1772 – 11 January 1835) was a British judge.

== Life ==
Taunton was born at Oxford in 1772, the eldest son of Sir William Elias Taunton, town clerk of Oxford and clerk of the peace for the county, by Frances, daughter of Stephen Grosvenor, sub-treasurer of Christ Church, Oxford. He was admitted king's scholar at Westminster School on 15 January 1785, and was elected to Christ Church, Oxford, where he matriculated 12 June 1789, graduating with a BA 1793, and MA 1796.

In 1793 he gained the chancellor's prize for the English essay, and in 1794 was admitted student of Lincoln's Inn. He was called to the bar in Easter term 1799 at Lincoln's Inn, and joined the Oxford circuit. In 1801 he became a commissioner of bankrupts, and in 1806 succeeded Charles Abbot (afterwards Lord Colchester) as Recorder of Oxford. He was created King's Counsel in 1821, and was elected a bencher of Lincoln's inn in 1822.

On 12 November 1830, he was appointed a justice of the King's Bench, and was knighted five days later. Taunton soon in his career acquired the reputation of a black-letter lawyer; as an advocate he was a somewhat dull and slow speaker who, however, "made the monotony of his voice impressive and used his sluggishness as a power"; as a judge he was appointed too late in life to leave much mark. He died somewhat suddenly in his house in Russell Square on 11 January 1835.

Taunton married, 10 October 1814, Maria, youngest daughter of Henry William Atkinson, provost of the Company of Moneyers, by whom he left two sons and four daughters.

He wrote Remarks upon the Conduct of the Respective Governments of France and Great Britain in the late Negotiation for Peace (1797), and assisted in preparing the edition of The Statutes of the Realm published by the Record Commission between 1810 and 1822.
