= Abingdon Road =

Road to the south of Oxford, England

Coordinates: 51.7385°N 1.2527°W

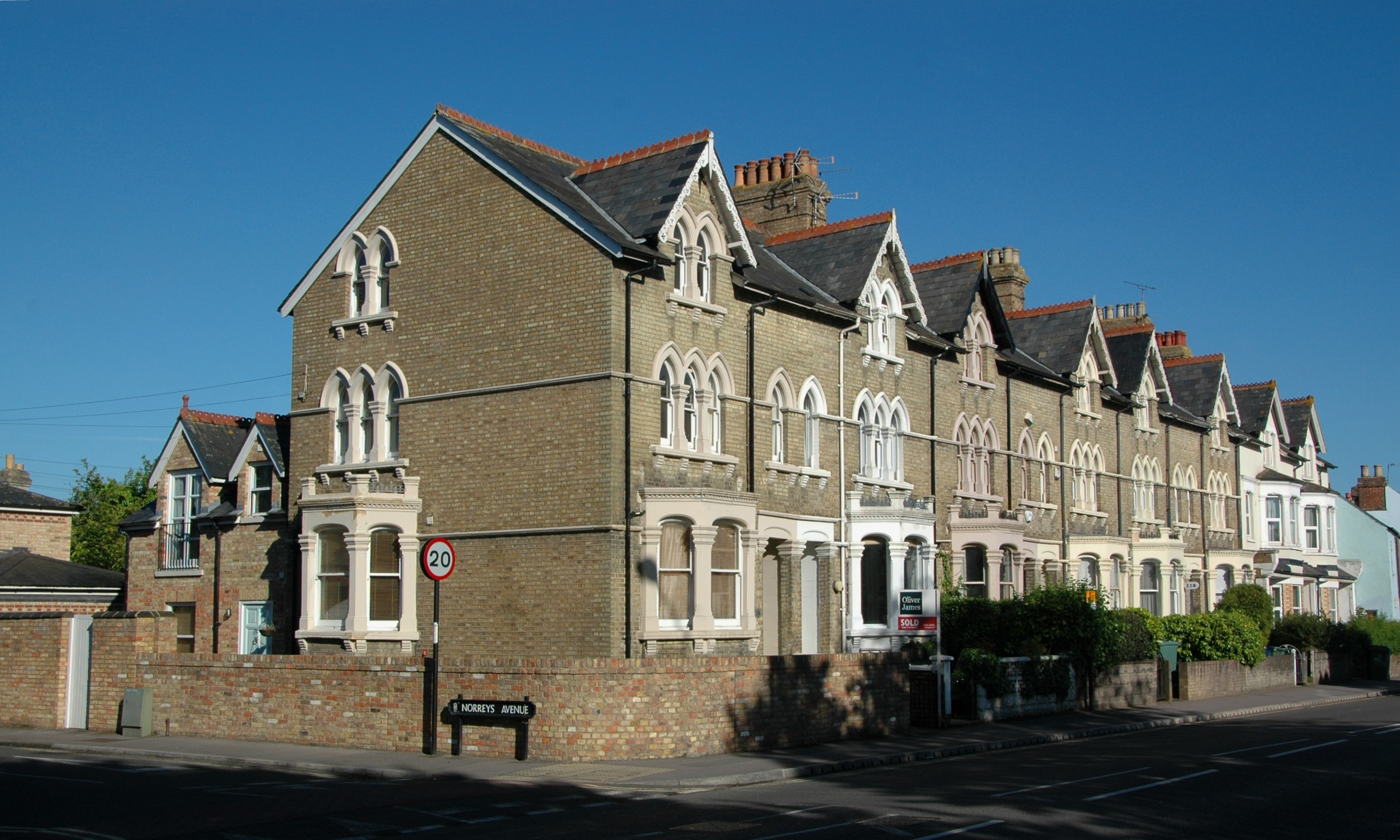
Terraced houses on Abingdon Road

Abingdon Road is the main arterial road to the south of the city of Oxford, England. The road passes through the suburbs of Grandpont and New Hinksey. It is named after the town of Abingdon to the south.

== History ==
Part of the road was known as the Causey or Causy until the 17th century, after the Grandpont causeway that ran from St Aldate's to Hinksey Hill.

== Location ==
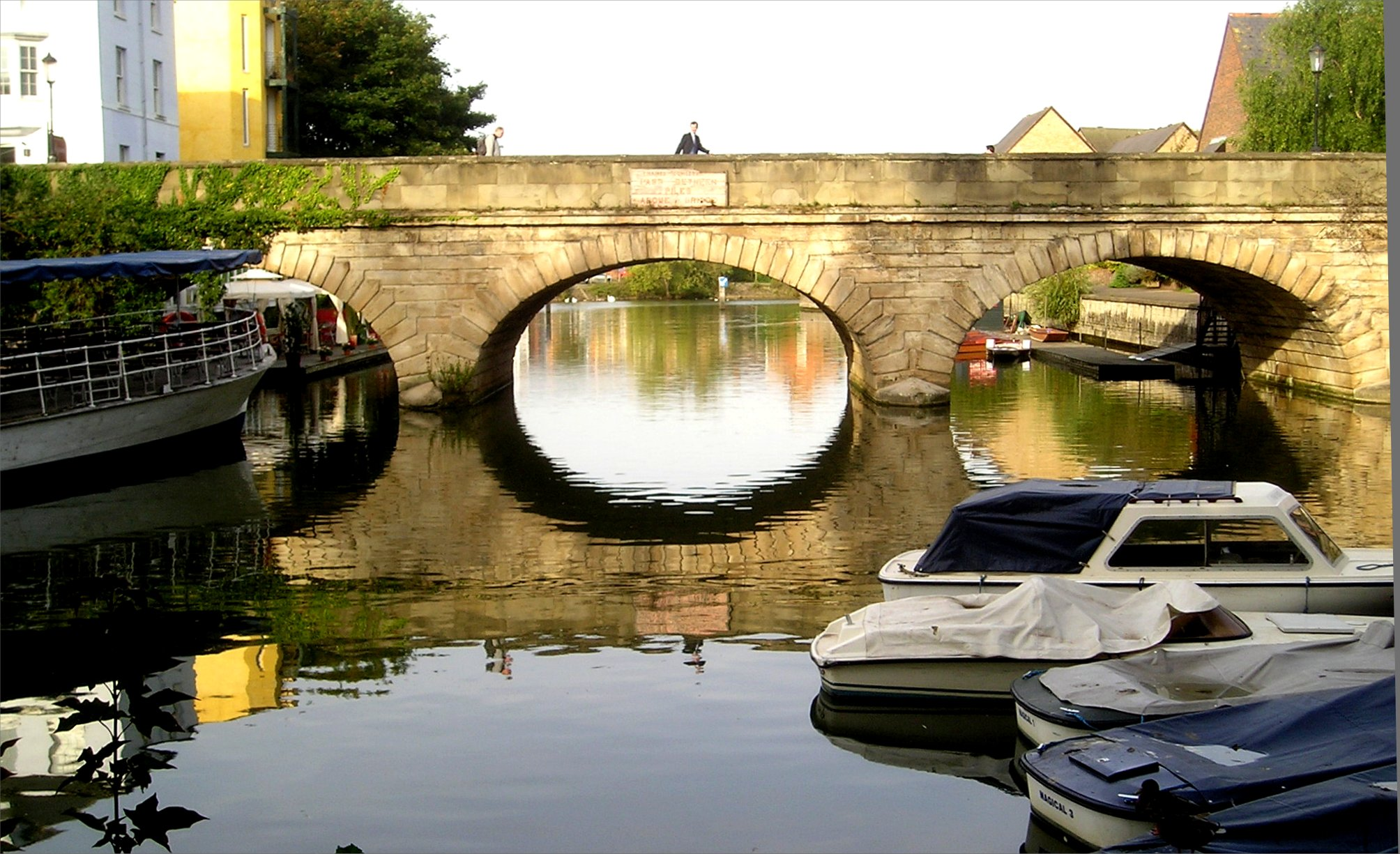
Folly Bridge at the north end of Abingdon Road

To the north, the road crosses the River Thames at Folly Bridge and becomes St Aldate's, which leads to the centre of Oxford at Carfax, although the one-way system now prevents traffic from taking a direct route. The road is designated the A4144 and joins with the A423 dual carriageway that forms part of the Oxford Ring Road to the south. It was previously part of the A34 before the Oxford Ring Road was built.

At its southern end, the road turns sharply to the west and is known as Old Abingdon Road, crossing the Cherwell Valley railway line over a brick bridge to the south of which is the site of the former Abingdon Road Halt railway station. The bridge is known locally as the Red Bridge, and it has given its name to the area, in particular to Redbridge Park and Ride, and Redbridge Waste Recycling Facility.

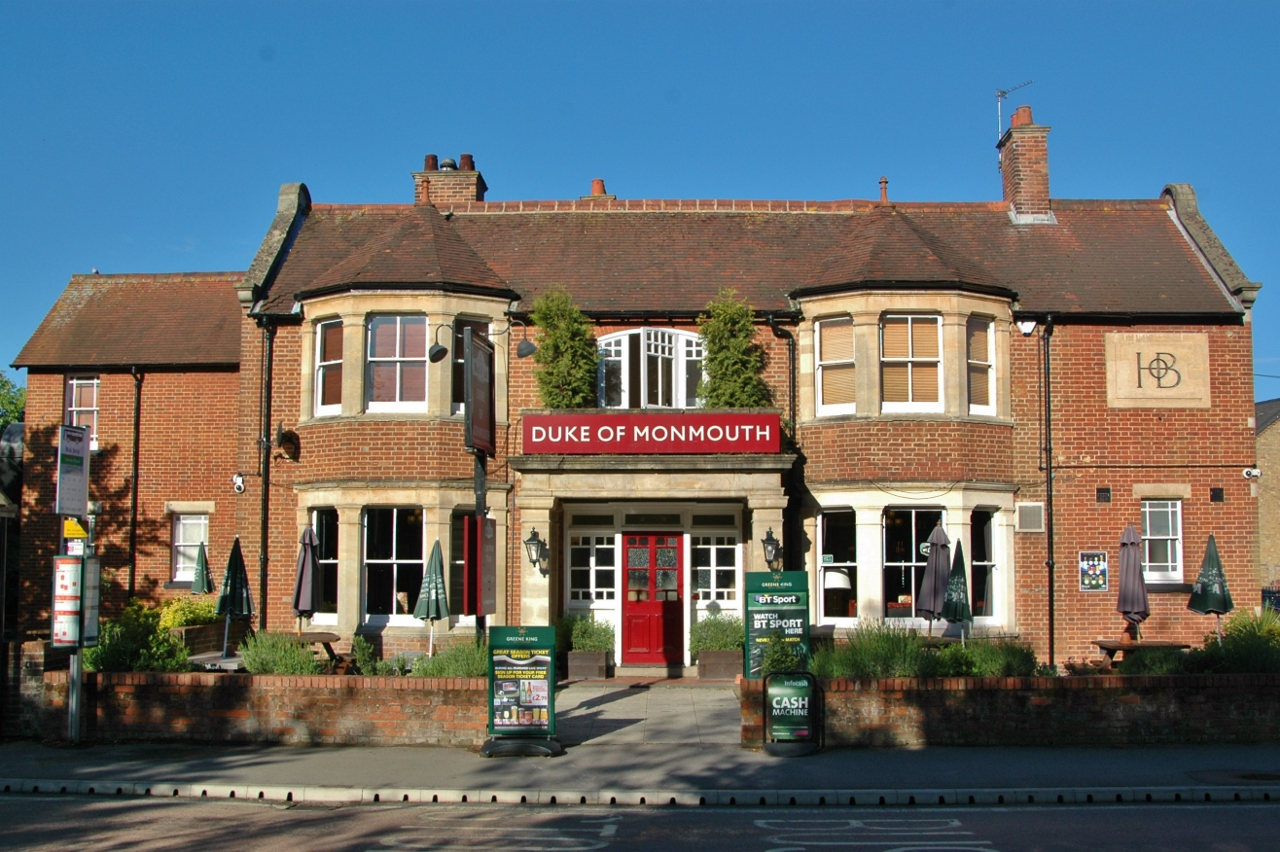
The Duke of Monmouth pub on Abingdon Road

The Duke of Monmouth public house is located on Abingdon Road.

== See also ==
- Abingdon Arms, a historic Oxford inn

== Gallery ==
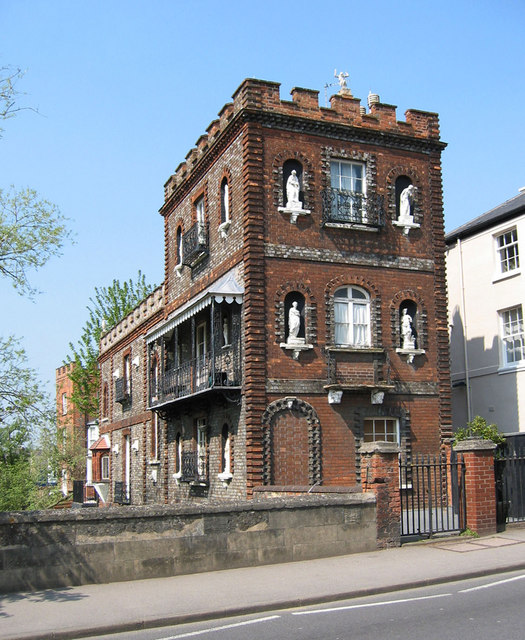
The castellated Isis House (1849) on Abingdon Road, just south of Folly Bridge

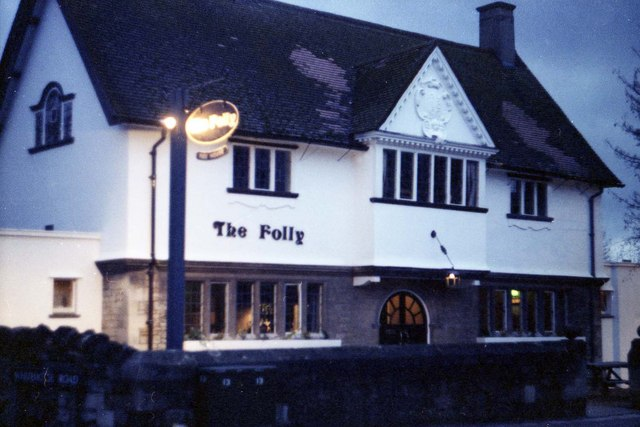
The Folly public house on Abingdon Road

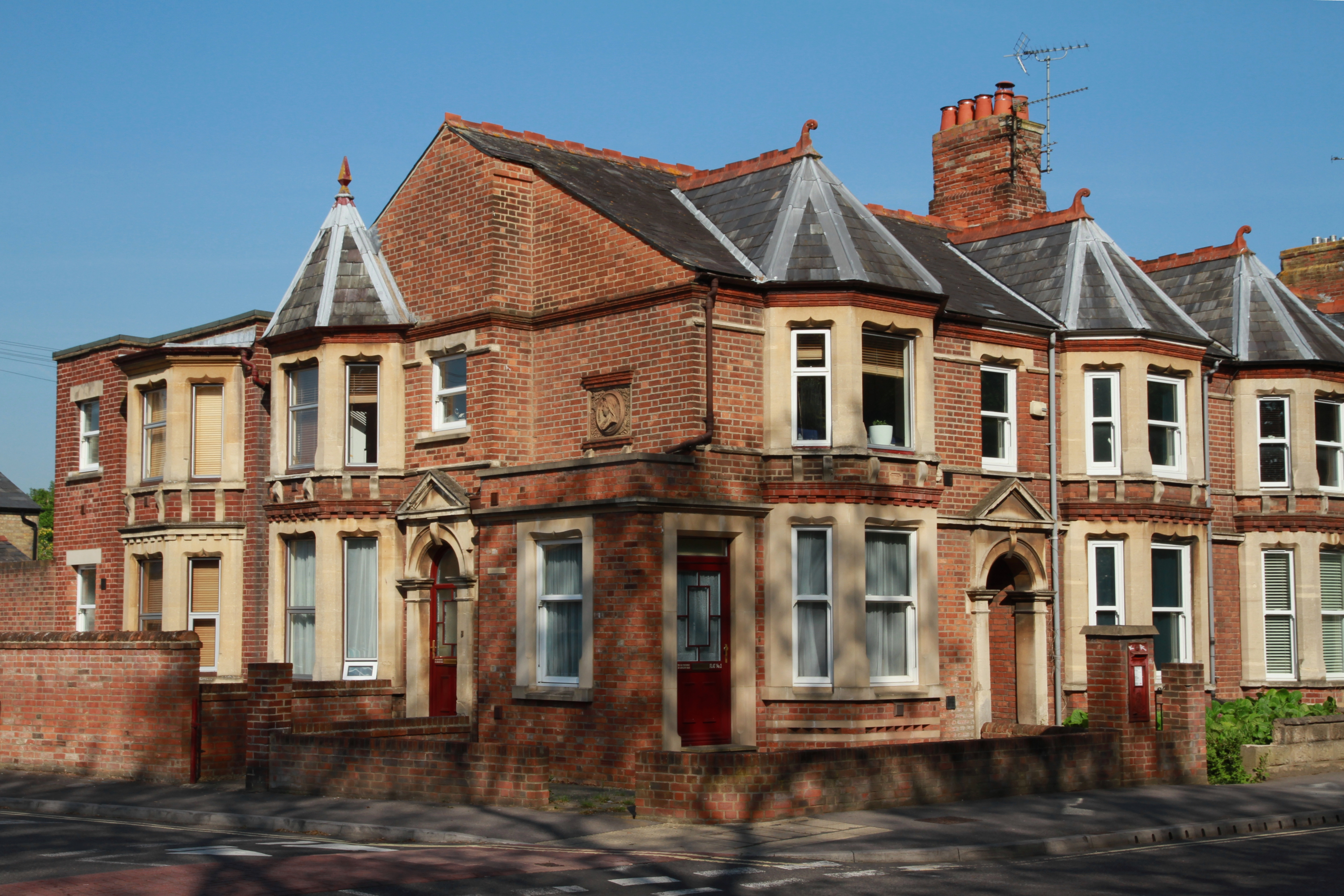
The former post office on Abingdon Road

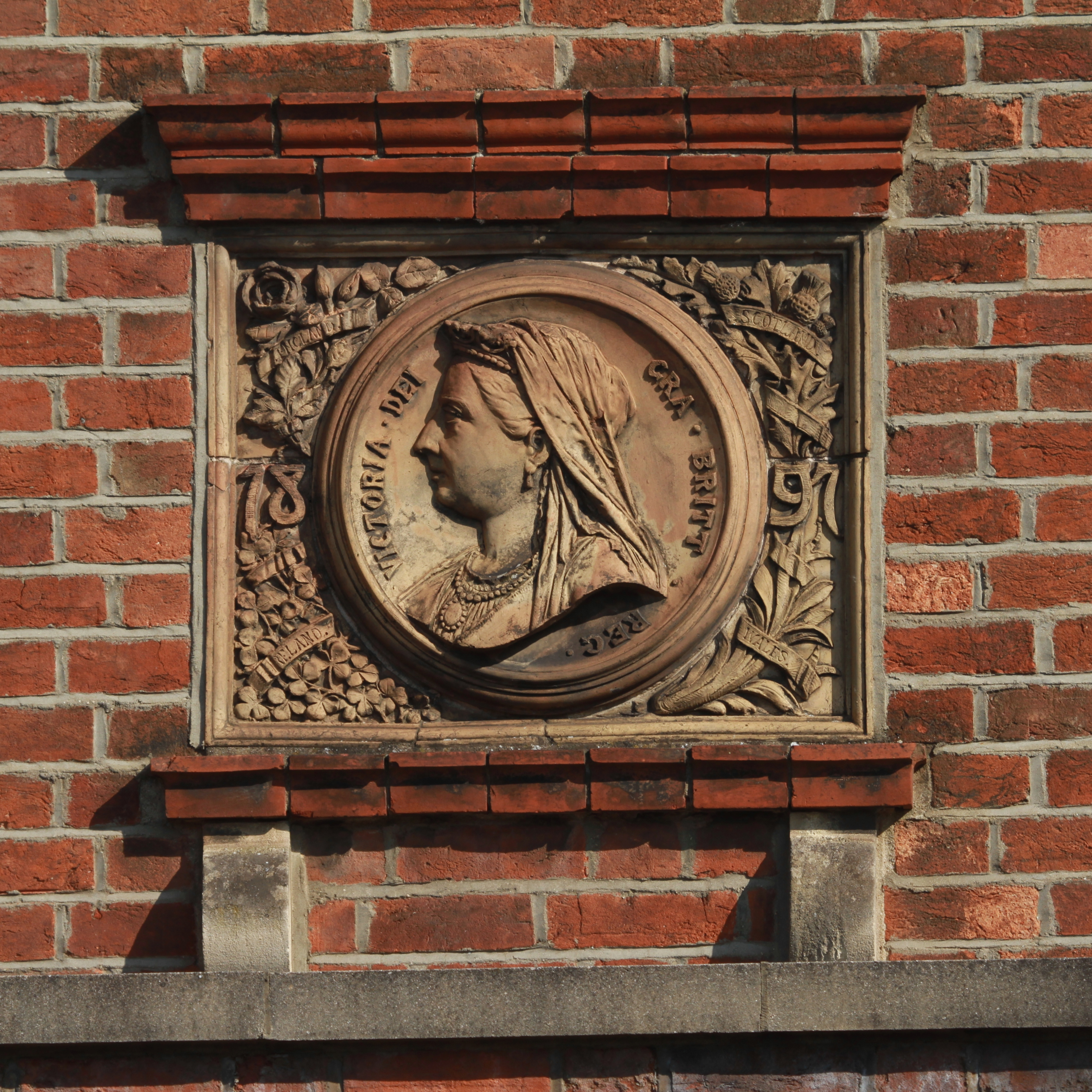
Terracotta relief of Queen Victoria at the former post office

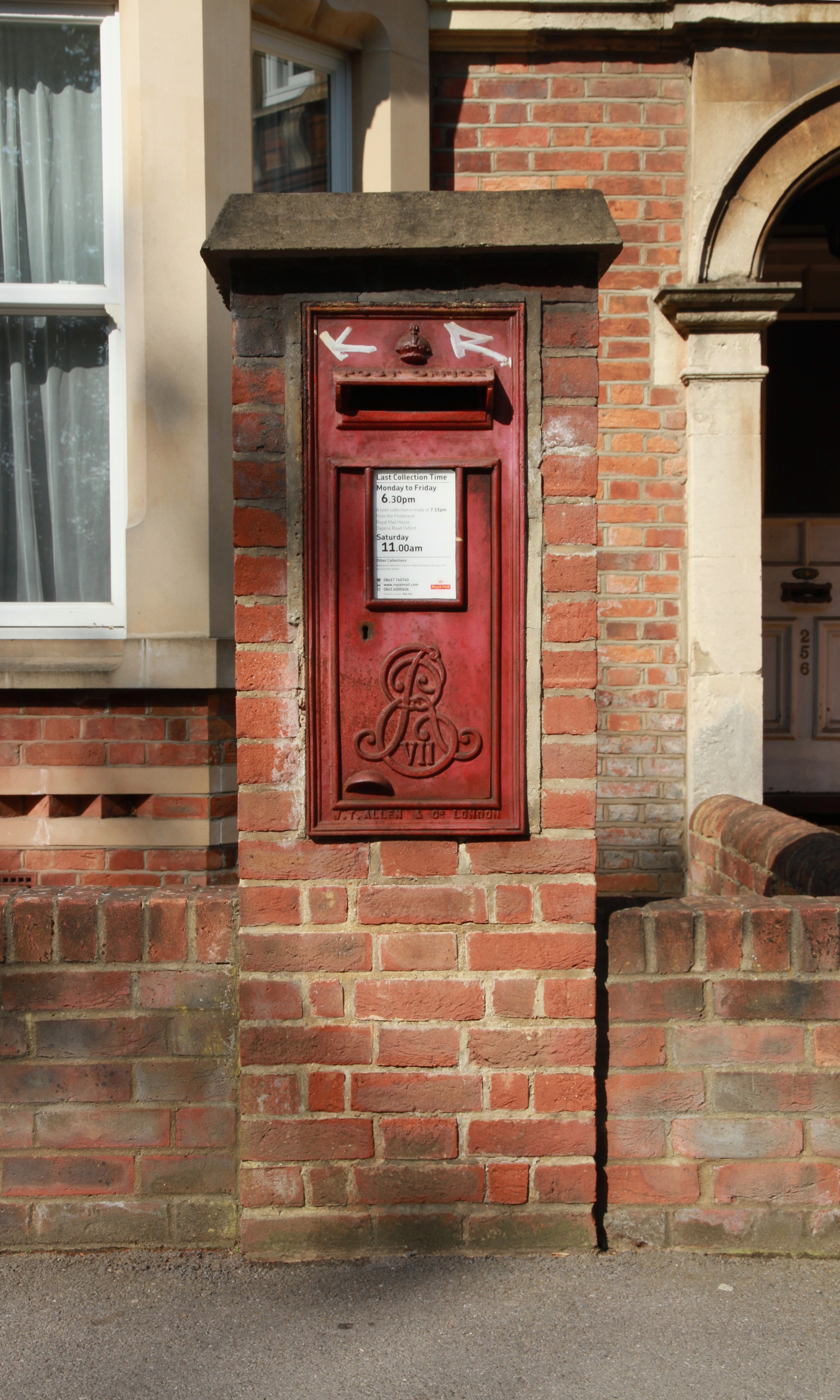
Edward VII wall-mounted postbox at the former post office

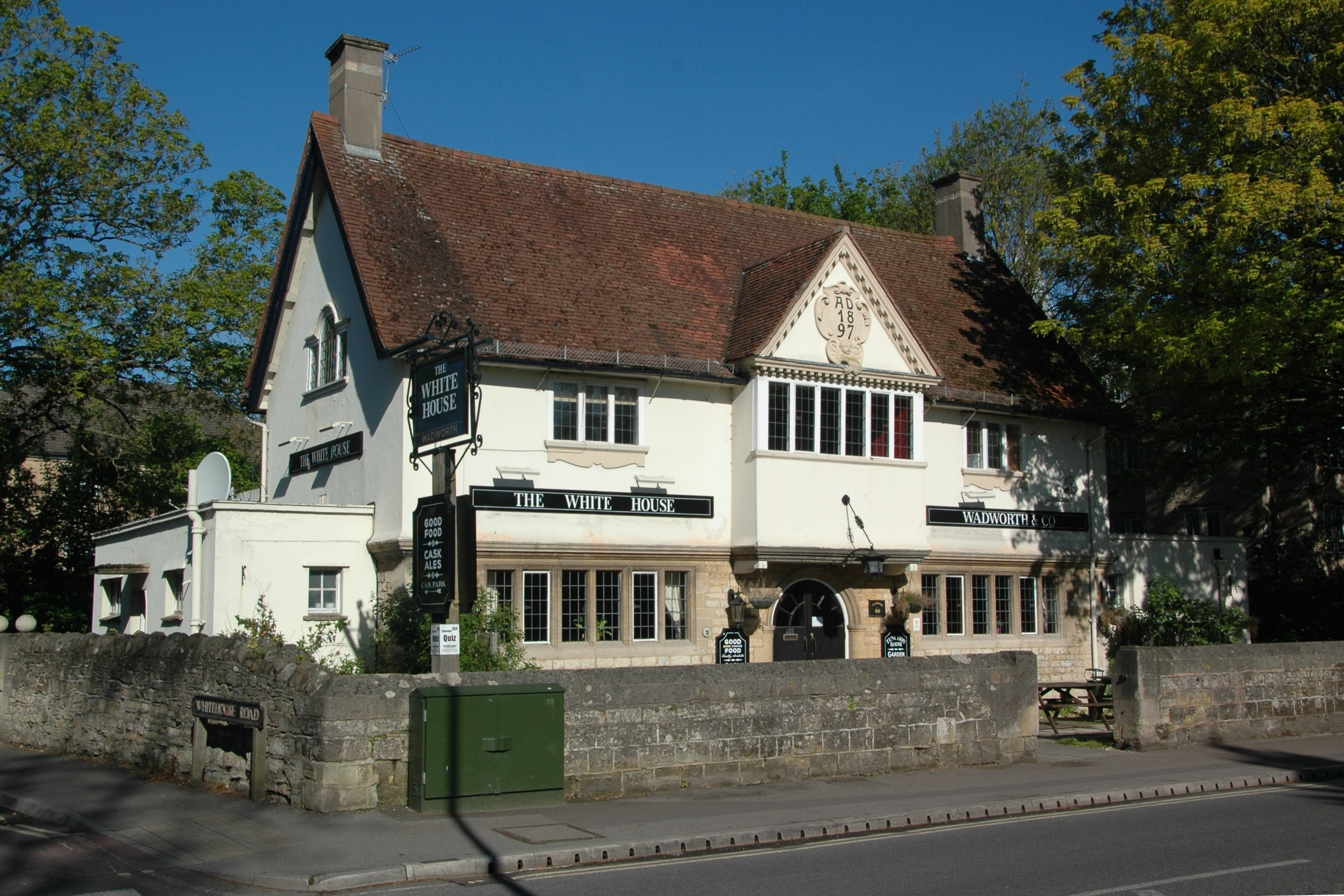
The White House pub on Abingdon Road

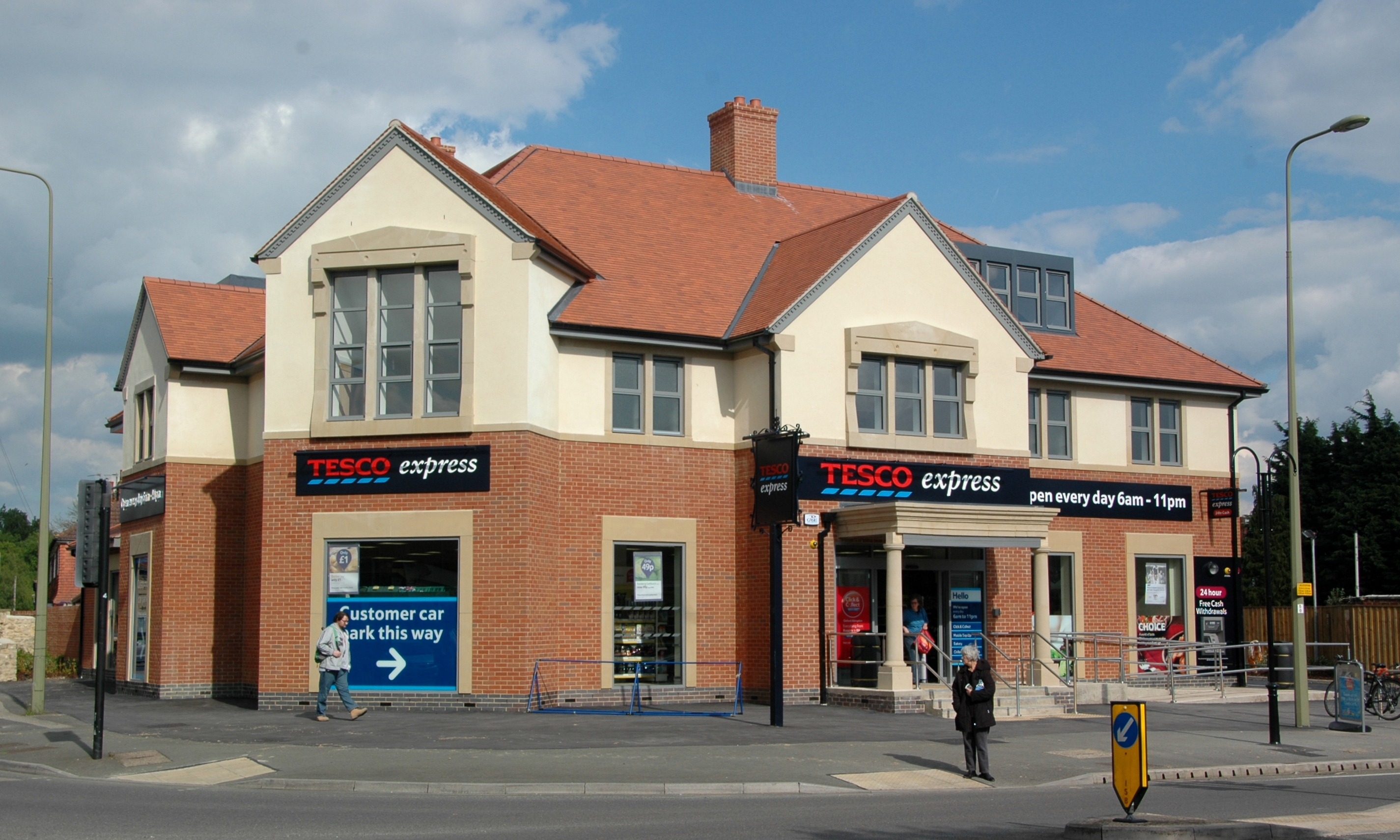
Tesco Express store on the site of the former Fox and Hounds pub on Abingdon Road
