= The Isis =

Name for the River Thames in Oxfordshire, England

Coordinates: 51.7429°N 1.2497°W

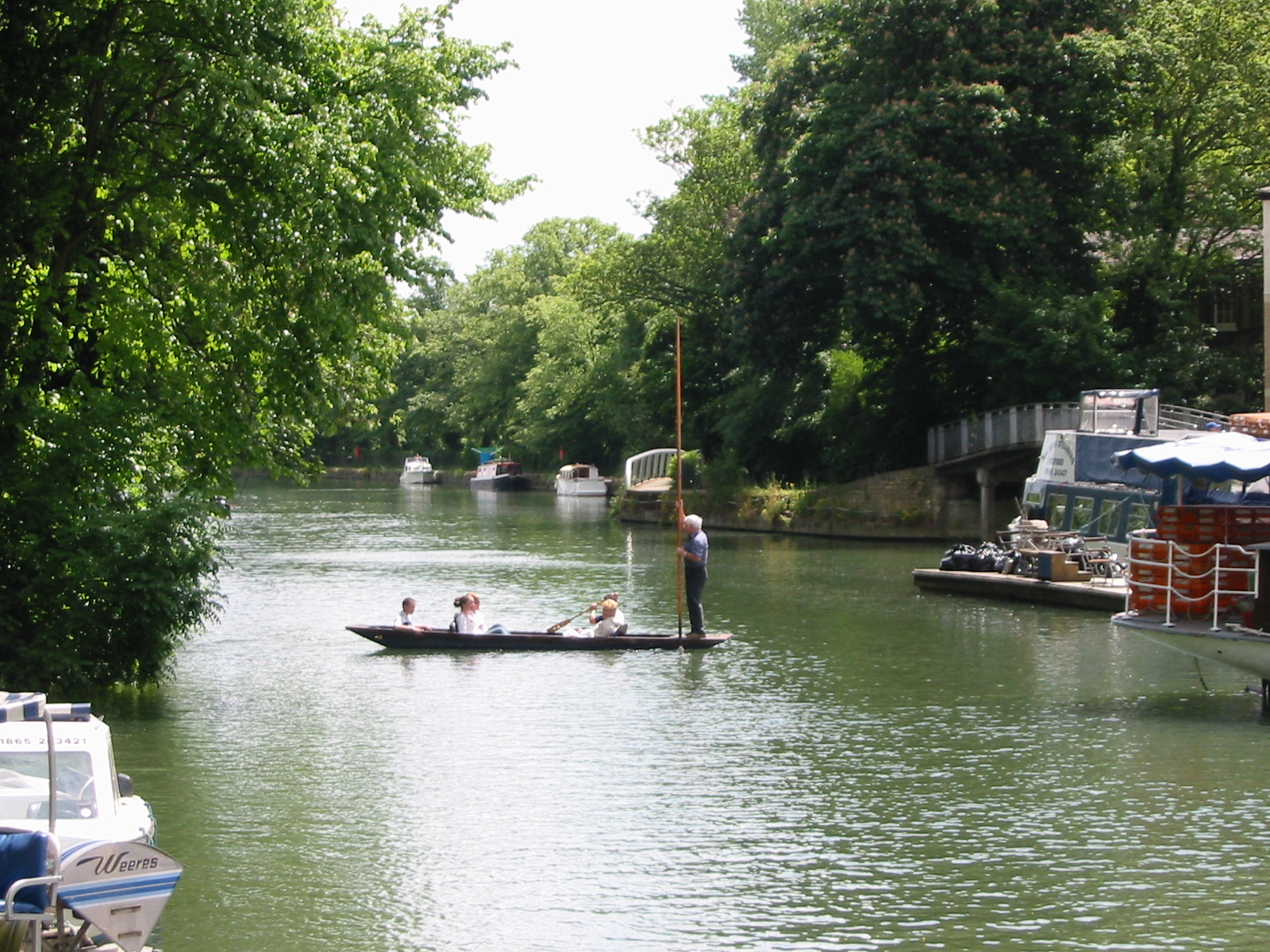
Punting on the Isis at Oxford.

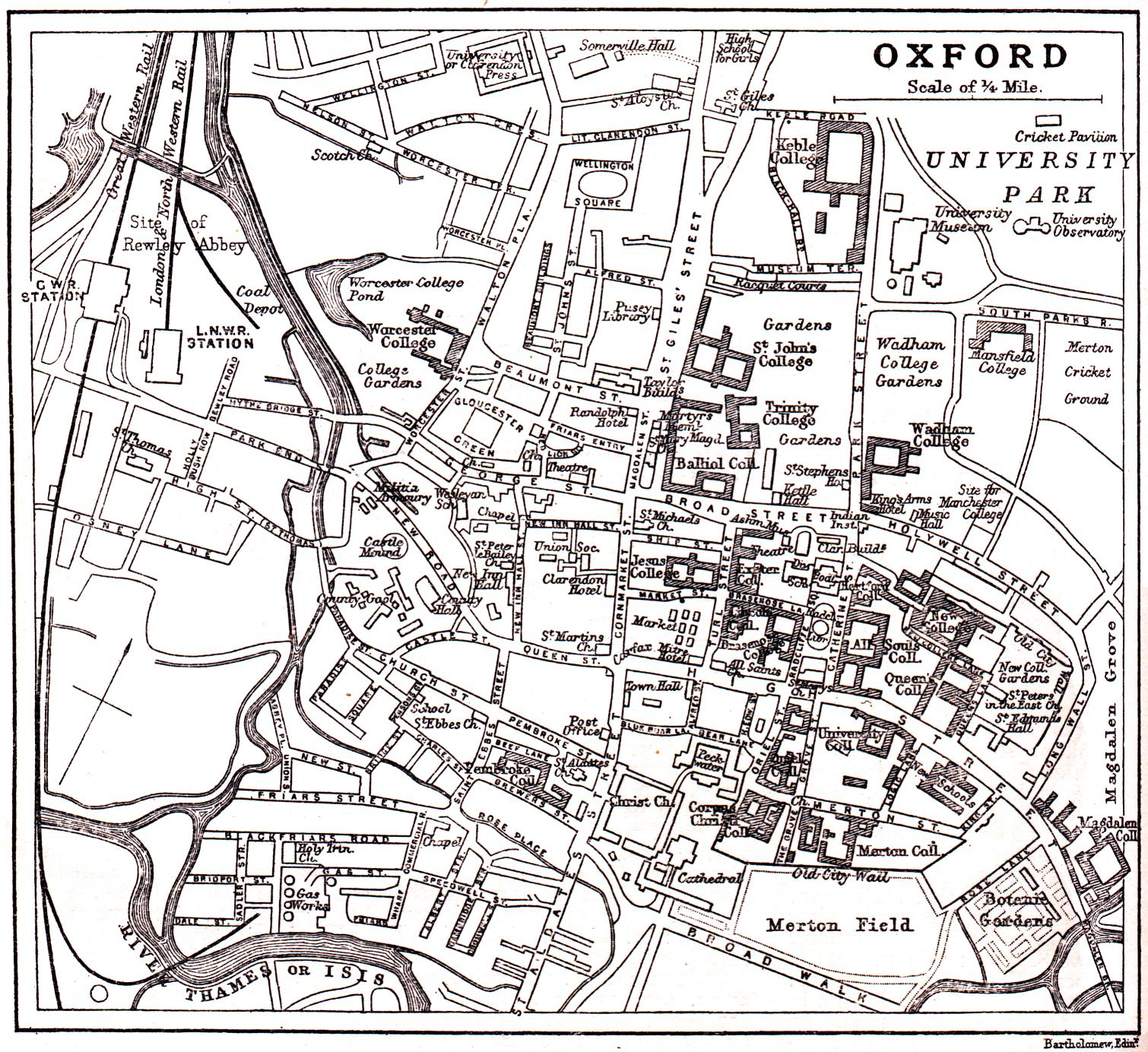
Map of Oxford c. 1900, with the river labelled as "River Thames or Isis".

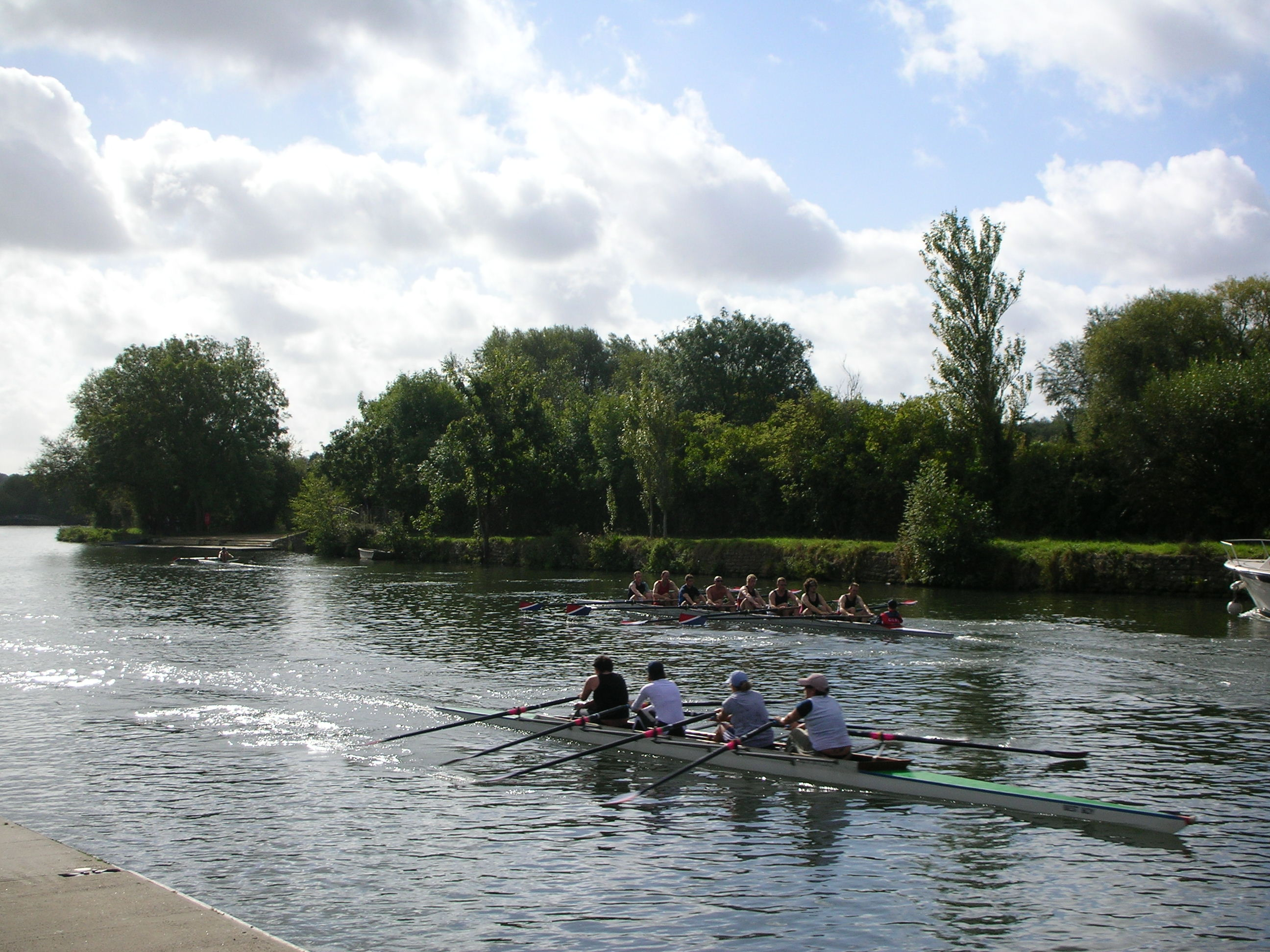
Rowing on the Isis opposite the Oxford college boathouses.

"The Isis" (/ˈaɪsɪs/ EYE-siss) is an alternative name for the River Thames, used from its source in the Cotswolds until it is joined by the River Thame at Dorchester-on-Thames in Oxfordshire. The Isis flows through Oxford and has given its name to several institutions and products of the city.

The modern form of the name, first recorded c. 1540, relates to the Egyptian goddess Isis. The deity was venerated throughout the Roman Empire, and was worshipped at the Temple of Isis near the Thames in Londinium during the Roman occupation.

== Rowing ==
The name "Isis" is especially used in the context of rowing at the University of Oxford. A number of rowing regattas are held on the Isis, including Eights Week, the most important Oxford University regatta, in the Trinity term (summer), Torpids in the Hilary term (early spring) and Tamesis Regatta for novices in the Michaelmas term (autumn). Because the width of the river is restricted at Oxford, rowing eights normally have a staggered start near Donnington Bridge and must then aim to "bump" the eight in front (i.e. catch up and touch or overlap with it sufficiently). The leading eight aims to "row over" (i.e. finish the race without being bumped).

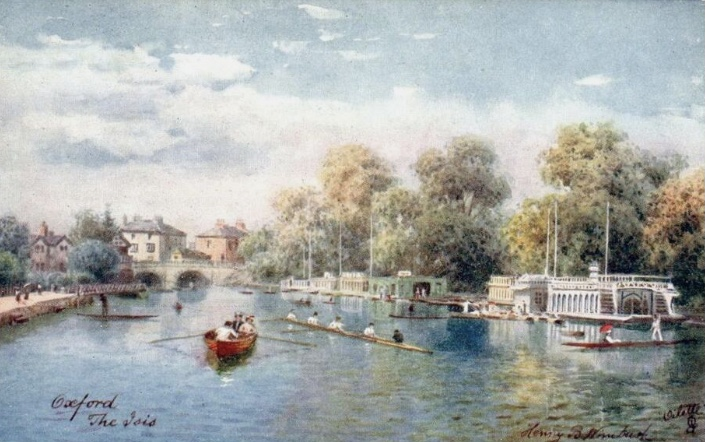
Henry B. Wimbush, "Oxford the Isis", c. 1910, showing college barges

There used to be ornate wooden barges on the river bank at the southern end of Christ Church Meadow to house rowing facilities and for viewing races. Now the barges are gone and there are boathouses instead a little further down the river near the confluence with the River Cherwell. Poplar Walk in Christ Church Meadow is used as a route to and from the boathouses.

The name "Isis" is also used for the men's second rowing eight of Oxford University Boat Club, who race against Goldie, the men's second crew of the Cambridge University Boat Club, before the annual Oxford vs. Cambridge Boat Race on the Thames in London.

== Angling ==
The Isis, like much of the Thames, has long been popular among anglers for its freshwater fish, including trout and crayfish. The Oxford region is home to several angling clubs. W. F. Wallett, a popular Victorian clown, shares in his memoirs his own anecdote about fishing in the Isis with the celebrated circus proprietor Pablo Fanque:

For a few days I amused myself with Pablo Fanque fishing in the Isis. Pablo was a very expert angler, and would usually catch as many fish as five or six of us within sight of him put together. This suggested a curious device. You must know that Pablo is a coloured man. One of the Oxonians, with more love for angling than skill, thought there must be something captivating in the complexion of Pablo. He resolved to try. One morning, going down to the river an hour or two earlier than usual, we were astonished to find the experimental philosophic angler with his face blacked after the most approved style of the Christy's Minstrels.

== Name ==
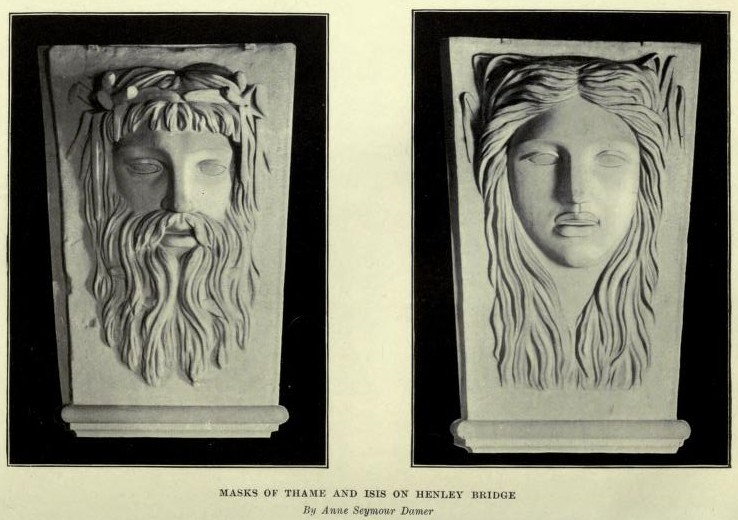
Thame and Isis, carved by Anne Seymour Damer.

The name of the river likely has Brittonic origins, influenced in its evolution by later interest in the Egyptian goddess Isis.

Known name variants for the upper Thames, recorded during the medieval period, include Ysa or Usa (14th century), Isa, Ise (14th century), and Isis or Ouse (16th century). The name variants Isa, Ise, suggest a Celtic origin and may derive from Brittonic is ('refresh') or isca ('water'). Many common river names have a similar origin, including the Axe, Esk, Exe and Usk, as well as the Celtic name for the Danube, Istros. It is possible that the earlier name Isa had a different meaning that was lost when replaced by a similar sounding name. It is unlikely that these early names were related to the Egyptian goddess.

The association between Oxford and the Egyptian goddess Isis might be explained by her role as Stella Maris – "Star of the Sea" and "divine protector of sailors and fishermen". The Latin Stella Maris relates to Mary, mother of Jesus, and the worship of Isis was associated with the transformation of Roman society away from paganism towards Christianity.

It had been conjectured that the Romano-British name for the Thames ("Tamesis") is a conflation (joining together) of its two main tributary names, the River Thame and the Isis. The conflation theory might explain why the Thames retained a trailing 's' – but the River Thame did not. The conflation theory was proposed and endorsed by antiquarians and scholars during the middle ages, including Ranulf Higden, John Leland, and William Camden (1551–1623). In the late 17th century, the Welsh scholar Edward Lhuyd – second Keeper of the Ashmolean Museum in Oxford – endorsed the conflation theory in Parochailia (1695).

Use of the modern form of the name Isis for the river was first recorded c.1540, and may have been influenced by the study of religion at the University of Oxford, the association of the Egyptian goddess with Christianity, and the association of the Thames with the Egyptian goddess. It may also have been influenced by the revival of interest in classical Roman antiquities during the Renaissance in the 16th century, and the conflation theory endorsed by the antiquarian John Leland.

== Name legacy ==
The Morris Isis name was first used by Morris Motors of Oxford on a six-cylinder car made from 1929 to 1931. It was resurrected on a six-cylinder car from the British Motor Corporation in the 1950s. The name died out in 1958.

HMP Isis is a Category C Young Offenders Institution in England operated by His Majesty's Prison Service, adjacent to HMP Belmarsh and HMP Thameside near the River Thames in the Woolwich area of South East London.

Each of the Formula Student cars manufactured by the Oxford Brookes University racing team used the name ISIS in the beginning of its chassis number. ISIS is then succeeded by the year number; for example, ISIS XII was the 2012 chassis, nicknamed "Miss Piggy". This continued until the 2016 season, when the naming convention changed to use an OBR prefix.

The ISIS neutron source is named after the river Isis.

== See also ==
- Port Meadow
- Folly Bridge
- River Cherwell
- Alice's Adventures in Wonderland
- Rowing on the River Thames
- Henley-on-Thames
- Tributaries of the River Thames
- List of rivers in England
