= Arden Mill =

Mill in Hawnby, Ryedale, England

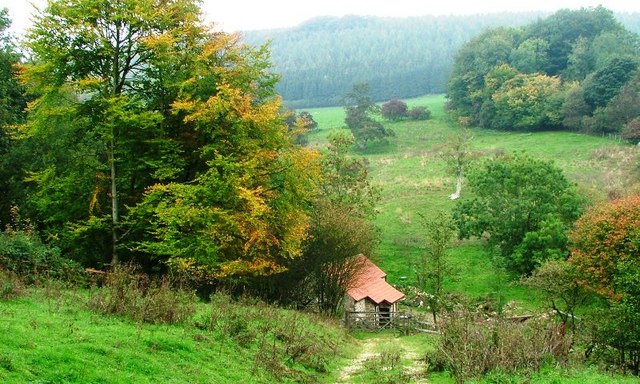
- The mill, in 2006
- Interactive map of the Arden Mill area

General information
- Architectural style: Vernacular industrial
- Location: Arden with Ardenside, near Hawnby, North Yorkshire, England
- Coordinates: 54.3031°N 1.2052°W

Technical details
- Material: Sandstone rubble with pantile roof

Designations

Listed Building – Grade II
- Designated: 27 October 2006
- Reference no.: 1391800

Arden Mill (also known as Arden Corn Mill) is an 18th-century former water-powered corn mill and mill house located in the parish of Arden with Ardenside, near Hawnby, North Yorkshire, England.

Situated on the banks of Arden Beck within the North York Moors National Park, the mill historically served the nearby Arden Hall estate and the surrounding agricultural communities of the Rye Valley. It was officially designated as a Grade II listed building on 27 October 2006.

== History ==
=== Monastic origins and estate history ===
A watermill has existed on or near the site since the medieval period, originally operated under the auspices of Arden Priory, a Benedictine nunnery founded around 1150 by Peter de Tusk (Peter de Ros). Following the Dissolution of the Monasteries in 1536, the priory lands and associated manorial rights—including the estate mill—were granted to Thomas Culpeper and subsequently passed to the Tancred family, who built Arden Hall nearby in the 17th century.

=== 18th and 19th-century operations ===
The present structure dates largely from the mid-to-late 18th century, representing a rebuilding of the earlier mill using local Ryedale sandstone. Driven by a mill race diverted from Arden Beck, the mill processed grain grown across the surrounding upland farmsteads.

Throughout the 19th century, the mill operated as a dual facility comprising the main grinding floor and attached living quarters for the resident miller.

=== Statutory protection and modern era ===
Commercial milling ceased at Arden Mill in the early 20th century as industrial roller mills in larger urban centres rendered small rural watermills uneconomic. On 27 October 2006, the complex was designated a Grade II listed building in recognition of its intact vernacular architecture, surviving mechanical context, and historical association with the Arden Hall estate landscape. The building has since been converted for private residential use while retaining its primary exterior form and watercourse alignment.

== Architecture ==
=== Structure and materials ===
Arden Mill and the attached Mill House are constructed as a continuous two-storey range built of local coursed sandstone rubble with dressed ashlar quoins under a traditional Yorkshire red pantile roof.

Key features include the Mill Building which is positioned at the lower end of the range, featuring a square-headed doorway, timber-framed casement windows, and a high-level loading hatch originally used for hoisting grain sacks. The Waterwheel Pit is situated on the gable end, where an overshot waterwheel was mounted to receive water fed by an overhead timber launder from the mill race. And the Mill House adjoining the mill section, featuring multi-pane casements, sandstone lintels, and stone chimney stacks.

== See also ==
- Grade II* listed buildings in North Yorkshire (district)
- Listed buildings in Hawnby
