= Listed buildings in Hawnby =

Hawnby is a civil parish in the county of North Yorkshire, England. It contains 33 listed buildings that are recorded in the National Heritage List for England. Of these, three are listed at Grade II*, the middle of the three grades, and the others are at Grade II, the lowest grade. The parish contains the village of Hawnby and the surrounding countryside and moorland. Most of the listed buildings are houses, cottages and associated structures, farmhouses and farm buildings. The others include a church and a chapel, a watermill, bridges, a former workshop, and a limekiln.

== Key ==
Grade	Criteria
II*	Particularly important buildings of more than special interest
II	Buildings of national importance and special interest

== Buildings ==
Name and location	Photograph	Date	Notes	Grade
All Saints' Church; 54.29993°N 1.17708°W		Early 12th century (probable)	The church has been altered through the centuries and was restored in 1874. It is built in sandstone and limestone, and has roofs of Welsh and Westmorland slate. The church consists of a three-bay nave with a south porch, and a two-bay chancel. On the west gable is a bellcote.	II*
Arden Hall; 54.30847°N 1.20283°W		17th century	The oldest part of the country house is the northwest wing, and additions were made through the centuries. It is in sandstone, with projecting quoins, floor bands, and roofs of stone slate, Welsh slate and Westmorland slate, with gable coping and shaped kneelers. There are three storeys, the top storey a later addition, a front range of seven bays, and rear cross-wings. The central doorway has a divided fanlight in a moulded architrave and a segmental pediment. The windows are sashes, those in the lower two floors with lintels and keystones.	II*
Barnclose House; 54.27686°N 1.13178°W		17th century or earlier	A farmhouse and flanking farm buildings in sandstone with a pantile roof. There are two storeys and five bays, the middle three bays forming the house, which contains a doorway and horizontally-sliding sash windows. The cart shed to the left contains an elliptical arch and a casement window, and in the barn to the right is a cruck truss.	II
Ewe Cote Farm Barn; 54.31894°N 1.13913°W	—	17th century ((probable)	The barn is in sandstone with a cruck frame, and a pantile roof with gable coping and square kneelers. There is a single storey and five bays. The barn contains stable doors and a fixed window, and inside are two cruck trusses.	II
Lockton House Farmhouse and byre 54.31878°N 1.13235°W	—	17th century	The house and byre are in sandstone with a vestigial cruck frame, and have a pantile roof with gable coping. The house has two storeys and three bays and a single-bay extension with the single-storey byre attached. In the house are two doorways, one casement window, and the other windows are horizontally-sliding sashes, the ground floor openings with massive lintels. The barn contains two doorways and casement windows.	II
Gate, Arden Hall; 54.30820°N 1.20294°W		Early 18th century	The gate and overthrow are in wrought iron. The overthrow is elaborate, with foliate and spiral designs around a central oval motif, and the gate has a simple fleur-de-lys design.	II
Gate piers, Arden Hall; 54.30823°N 1.20294°W	—	Early 18th century	The gate piers to the south of the house are in sandstone, about 1 metre (3 ft 3 in) square and 4 metres (13 ft) high. Each pier has a pulvinated frieze and a moulded cornice, and is surmounted by an owl.	II
Arden Mill; 54.30881°N 1.20032°W		Early 18th century	The water-powered cotton mill is in stone with a pantile roof. There is a single storey and three bays, and the smoke bay of the former miller's house to the north. The southern bay contains the waterwheel in a pit, with a culvert]ed tailrace to the east. In the roof are two cruck trusses, and the smoke bay contains an inglenook fireplace.	II*
Hawnby House; 54.30038°N 1.16866°W	—	1733	The house, at one time a rectory, in sandstone with a swept roof of pantile and Welsh slate, gable coping and shaped kneelers. There are two storeys, a main range of three bays, an extension to the right, and a parallel rear service wing. The doorway has a fanlight, it is flanked by canted bay windows, and the other windows are sashes.	II
Bumper Castle; 54.32418°N 1.15454°W		Mid 18th century	A house, now a ruin, in sandstone, with massive quoins, a stepped eaves course, and without a roof. There are two storeys and two bays. The central doorway is flanked by a sash window to the right and a horizontally-sliding sash to the left, and in the upper floor is a pitching window.	II
The Village Stores; 54.29733°N 1.16826°W		1762	A house and shop in sandstone, with a stepped eaves course, and a pantile roof with gable coping and shaped kneelers. There are two storeys and an attic, and three bays. The doorway is in the centre, and above it is an initialled datestone. The windows in the lower two floors are sashes, and in the attic is a small horizontally-sliding sash.	II
1 Front Street; 54.29734°N 1.16814°W		Late 18th century	The house is in limestone and has a Roman tile roof with gable coping and shaped kneelers. There are two storeys, one bay, and a rear extension. The windows are sashes.	II
Blow Gill Farmhouse; 54.33054°N 1.19036°W		Late 18th century	The house is in sandstone, and has a swept pantile roof with gable coping. There are two storeys, three bays, and a rear cross wing. On the front are two doorways and a fire window, and the other windows are horizontally-sliding sashes.	II
Church Bridge; 54.30209°N 1.17939°W		Late 18th century	The bridge carries a road over the River Rye. It is in sandstone, and consists of a single arch flanked by flat buttresses. The bridge has a band and a plain coped parapet.	II
Dale Town; 54.29008°N 1.17874°W	—	Late 18th century	The house is in sandstone, with quoins, and a pantile roof with gable coping and shaped kneelers. There are two storeys and three bays. On the front is a porch and a doorway with a fanlight. The windows are sashes with tripartite lintels and keystones.	II
Easterside Farmhouse; 54.29887°N 1.15229°W		Late 18th century	The house is in sandstone, with a stepped eaves course, and a swept pantile roof with gable coping and shaped kneelers. There are two storeys, three bays, and two rear cross wings. The doorway has a divided fanlight, and the windows are casements.	II
Harker Gates; 54.31547°N 1.19156°W		Late 18th century	The house is in limestone, with quoins, and a pantile roof with gable coping and shaped kneelers. There are two storeys and three bays. The doorway is in the centre, the windows are horizontally-sliding sashes, and all the openings have flat arches.	II
Head House; 54.36664°N 1.17876°W		Late 18th century	The house is in sandstone, and has a swept pantile roof with gable coping and square kneelers. There are two storeys, two bays and a single-storey outhouse on the left. It contains two doorways, and casement windows with chamfered sills and lintels.	II
Jack Row; 54.30129°N 1.16680°W	—	Late 18th century	A row of five cottages in sandstone, with a swept pantile roof and shaped kneelers. There are two storeys and five bays. On the front are five doorways, and the windows are fixed, or horizontally-sliding sashes.	II
Laskill Bridge; 54.30984°N 1.13664°W		Late 18th century	The bridge carries Knolls Lane over the River Seph. It is in sandstone, and consists of a single segmental arch flanked by buttresses. The bridge has a band and a parapet.	II
Laverock Hall South; 54.32789°N 1.12188°W	—	Late 18th century	The house is in sandstone, and has a swept pantile roof with gable coping and shaped kneelers. There are two storeys and four bays. On the front is a doorway, and the windows are horizontally-sliding sashes.	II
Plane Tree Hall Farmhouse; 54.34080°N 1.21038°W		Late 18th century	The farmhouse is in sandstone, and has a swept pantile roof with gable coping and shaped kneelers. There are two storeys and three bays, and a cross wing on the front left. Some windows have fixed lights, and others are casements, those in the upper floor with lintels and keystones.	II
Sportsman's Hall; 54.31963°N 1.16297°W		Late 18th century	The house is in limestone, rendered on the front, with massive quoins, and a Westmorland slate roof with gable coping and shaped kneelers. There are two storeys, three bays, and a ten-bay cross wing at the rear. All the windows are casements with keystones.	II
The Village Hall; 54.29707°N 1.16846°W	—	Late 18th century	A weaving workshop, later used as the village hall, it is in sandstone, with massive quoins, a concave cornice, and a pantile roof with gable coping and shaped kneelers. There are two storeys and four bays. On the front is a doorway with a chamfered lintel, and a stable door. There are fixed windows in the ground floor, and both floors contain horizontally-sliding sashes.	II
Mill House; 54.29722°N 1.16793°W	—	1781	The house is in sandstone, and has a swept pantile roof with gable coping and shaped kneelers. There are two storeys and three bays. The doorway has an inscribed datestone, and the windows are horizontally-sliding sashes.	II
Low Cote Farmhouse; 54.34617°N 1.21437°W		c. 1800	A house, stables and barn in sandstone, with a pantile roof and gable coping. There are two storeys, the house has four bays, the stable has three, there is a single-storey kitchen wing and a rear outshut. In the house are quoins, horizontally-sliding sash windows and a fire window, and the stable contains three stable doors.	II
Limekiln west of Plane Tree Hall Farm; 54.34076°N 1.20953°W		c. 1800	The limekiln is in sandstone and about 7 metres (23 ft) high. It is a circular structure with a tall arch and a flue to the rear.	II
Ristbrow Farmhouse; 54.29254°N 1.15752°W		Late 18th to early 19th century	The farmhouse is in sandstone and limestone, with quoins, and a pantile roof with gable coping and shaped kneelers. There are two storeys and four bays. The doorway has a fanlight, and the windows are sashes, some horizontally-sliding. On the right gable end is an external staircase.	II
Wesleyan Chapel; 54.29718°N 1.16845°W	—	c.1814	The chapel was rebuilt using materials from an older structure dated 1770. It is in sandstone, and has a pantile roof with gable coping and shaped kneelers. There are two storeys and two bays. Above the central doorway is a re-used datestone, and the windows are sashes.	II
6 Front Street; 54.29724°N 1.16859°W	—	Early 19th century	The house is in sandstone, with massive quoins, and a Roman tile roof with gable coping and shaped kneelers. There are two storeys and an attic, and one bay. On the front is a doorway, and a two-light horizontally-sliding sash window in each floor.	II
Wesley Cottage; 54.29727°N 1.16847°W	—	Early 19th century	The house is in sandstone with a Roman tile roof. There are two storeys, two bays, and a rear cross wing. The central doorway has a divided fanlight, and the windows are sashes with stone lintels.	II
Daleside Cottage; 54.29333°N 1.18116°W		c. 1830	The house is in whitewashed limestone on a plinth, with a hipped Welsh slate roof. There are two storeys and three bays. The central doorway has Tuscan columns, a radial fanlight and a dentilled open pediment, and the windows are sashes.	II
Farm buildings west of Lockton Farmhouse; 54.31878°N 1.13273°W		1849	The range of farm buildings is in sandstone, and has a pantile roof with gable coping and a shaped kneeler on the right. The buildings consist of a byre on the left, a stable in the centre, and a cart shed with a granary above on the right. There are two storeys and three bays. In the ground floor are three stable doors with massive lintels, one dated and initialled, and an elliptical arch in the cart shed. The upper floor contains two fixed windows and a pitching door.	II
