= Littlemore =

Civil parish in Oxfordshire, England

Coordinates: 51.720°N 1.227°W

- Saints Mary and Nicholas parish church

- Location within Oxfordshire
- Area: 1.88 km^{2} (0.73 sq mi)
- Population: 5,646 (2011 Census)
  - Density: 3,003/km^{2} (7,780/sq mi)
- OS grid reference: SP537028
- Civil parish: Littlemore
- District: Oxford
- Shire county: Oxfordshire
- Region: South East
- Country: England
- Sovereign state: United Kingdom
- Post town: Oxford
- Postcode district: OX4
- Dialling code: 01865
- Police: Thames Valley
- Fire: Oxfordshire
- Ambulance: South Central
- UK Parliament: Oxford East
- Website: Littlemore Parish Council Oxfordshire

Littlemore is a district and civil parish in Oxford, England. The civil parish includes part of Rose Hill. It is about 2 1/2 miles (4 km) southeast of the city centre of Oxford, between Rose Hill, Blackbird Leys, Cowley, and Sandford-on-Thames. The 2011 Census recorded the parish's population as 5,646, with the electoral ward (which also includes several streets in southern Cowley) having a total population of 6,441.

== History ==
In the Middle Ages, and perhaps earlier, most of Littlemore was a detached part of the parish of St Mary the Virgin in Oxford. Between 1517 and 1518 the local priory became subject to the Littlemore Priory scandals. The rest of the township was in the parish of Iffley. Littlemore was not made a separate ecclesiastical parish until 1847. It became a civil parish in 1866. Until the early 20th century Littlemore was rural. Extensive development started in the 1920s and continued in the 1950s.

== St Nicholas' Priory ==
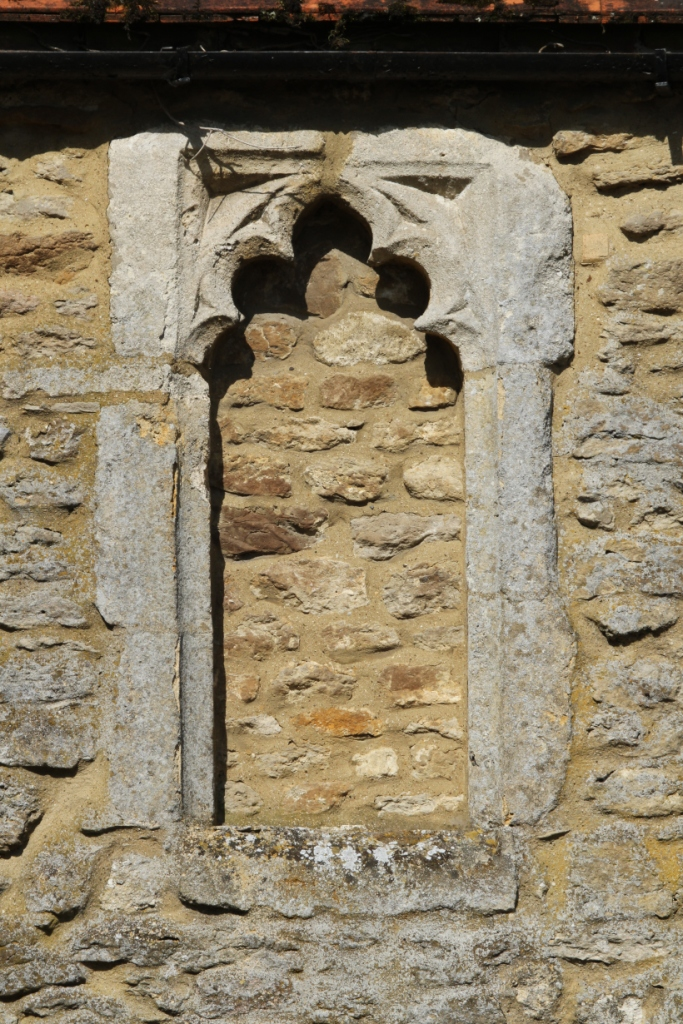
A blocked 15th-century window of the dormitory range of the former priory, now Minchery Farmhouse

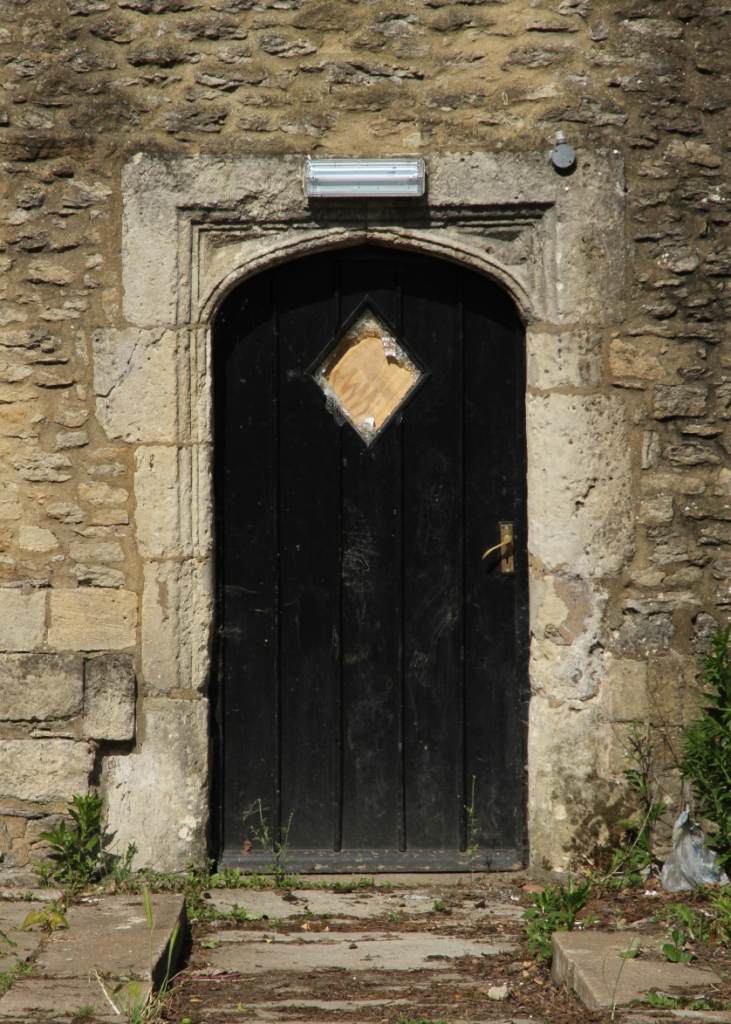
East door of the dormitory range of the former priory

Early in the 12th century Sir Robert de Sandford founded a priory of Benedictine nuns on a piece of land called Cherley. It was dedicated originally to Saints Mary, Nicholas and Edmund, but within a few years this was reduced to only St Nicholas. The location of Cherley was described variously as Sandford or Littlemore until the middle of the 13th century, after which it was referred to always as Littlemore. Sir Robert endowed the priory with six virgates of land in Sandford parish. Subsequent members of the de Sandford family made further endowments: another nine virgates of land in Sandford, 10 shillings a year from Wytham, tithes from Bayworth and Lambourn, and land at Garsington, Kennington, Sydenham, Oxfordshire and Liverton in the parish of Chilton. At one time the priory also claimed the advowson of St Mary's parish church at Puttenham, Hertfordshire and held land at Bureweya or Bergheia (Barway) in the parish of Soham in Cambridgeshire. King Henry III paid 40 shillings a year to maintain a prebendaria at the priory and in 1232 granted the priory one hide of land at Hendred.

In 1445 Dr John Derby visited the priory on behalf of William Alnwick, Bishop of Lincoln. Seven nuns were living there but their dormitory was in such disrepair that they did not sleep in it, for fear it would collapse. The nuns were breaking their Rule by eating meat every day, three lay women were boarding at the priory, and a Cistercian monk frequently visited and drank with the prioress. In 1517 Edmund Horde visited the priory on behalf of a subsequent Bishop of Lincoln, William Atwater. He found that the prioress, Katherine Wells, had an illegitimate daughter, the father was a priest who still visited her, and Wells had taken much of the priory's goods and pawned its valuables to provide the girl with a dowry.

There was no food, clothing or spending money for the nuns. Within the last year another of the nuns had had an illegitimate child whose father was a married man in Oxford. Some of the other nuns had rebuked Wells but she had responded by putting them in the stocks. There were five nuns, and Wells had ordered them all to tell Horde that all was well. Bishop William Atwater summoned and examined Wells, who admitted these irregularities had been going on for eight years. Atwater deposed her but allowed her to remain in post for the time being, provided she did nothing without Horde's approval. Nine months after Horde's report, Bishop Atwater visited the priory himself.

He found that Wells had taken revenge on those nuns who had told the truth, putting one in the stocks for a month and kicking and punching another nun in the head. Another nun continued to misbehave, romping (luctando) with boys in the cloister and refusing to stop. When she was put in the stocks as a punishment, three other nuns released her and burnt the stocks. When Wells tried to rebuke them, the four escaped from the priory via a window and went to stay with friends for two or three weeks. In 1524 Thomas Wolsey, the Lord Chancellor, recommended that the priory be dissolved. In February 1525 the priory was dissolved and the prioress was pensioned off.

=== Archaeology ===
In 1970 the historian William Pantin published a conjectural plan of the priory church, refectory and other buildings arranged around a cloister west of the surviving building. In 2012 The East Oxford Archaeology & History Project excavated part of Minchery Farm Paddock. It found walls of a well-built Medieval stone building at right-angles to the farmhouse. Finds of fine pottery, metalwork, decorated tiles and animal bones suggest it was a domestic building. The building is roughly where Pantin postulated that the refectory may have been. In 2014 John Moore Heritage Services found and excavated the site of the priory church. It was built in the 13th century, with a choir, central tower, nave, belfry and north transept.

A smaller mid-12th-century church may have been on the site before the 13th-century one was built, but the evidence for this was not conclusive. The dig revealed 92 human burials at the site. Most were inside the church: in the choir, north transept and nave. The remainder were outside just east of the choir. 35 of the burials were female and 28 were male. The sex of the remaining 29 was not determined. One burial was in a limestone cist, positioned under what would have been the centre of the tower, and contained the remains of a woman aged 45 or older. She is likely to have been a prioress. Another burial near the west end of the nave was a woman aged between 19 and 25, laid face down. Part of the grave had been disturbed, her legs were missing, and the body of an infant was buried where they had been.

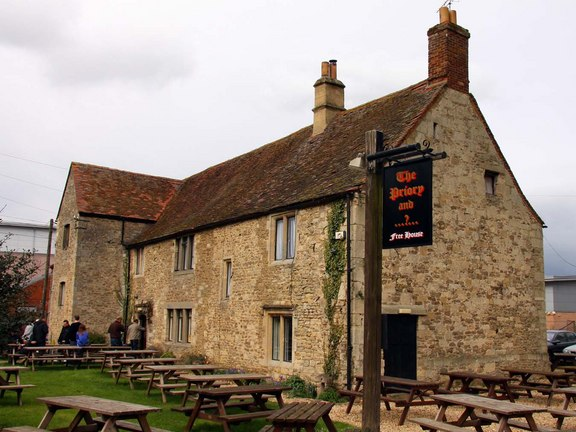
Minchery Farmhouse, a country club by 1963, seen in this 2009 image as the "Priory and ?" pub – which closed in 2013

=== Minchery Farmhouse ===
One building of the priory survives. It has been identified as the east range of the cloister garth, with the chapter house and other rooms on the ground floor and the nuns' dormitory on the first floor. In about 1600 it was remodelled as Minchery Farmhouse. Later it was extended, probably late in the 18th century. As Littlemore became more developed, the house was changed first into a country club and later into the "Priory" pub, which closed in 2013. The house became a Grade II* listed building in July 1963, when it was being used by the country club.

== Churches ==
=== Church of England ===
St Nicholas' priory had a priory church, but until the 19th century Littlemore had no parish church. In 1828 John Henry Newman was appointed vicar of St Mary's and he started agitating for a separate church at Littlemore. The new parish church of Saint Mary and Saint Nicholas was designed by the architect H. J. Underwood, built in 1835 and consecrated in 1836. The chancel and northeast tower were added in 1848, and the vestry in 1918. The church is in a Gothic Revival style and became a model for smaller churches of the time.

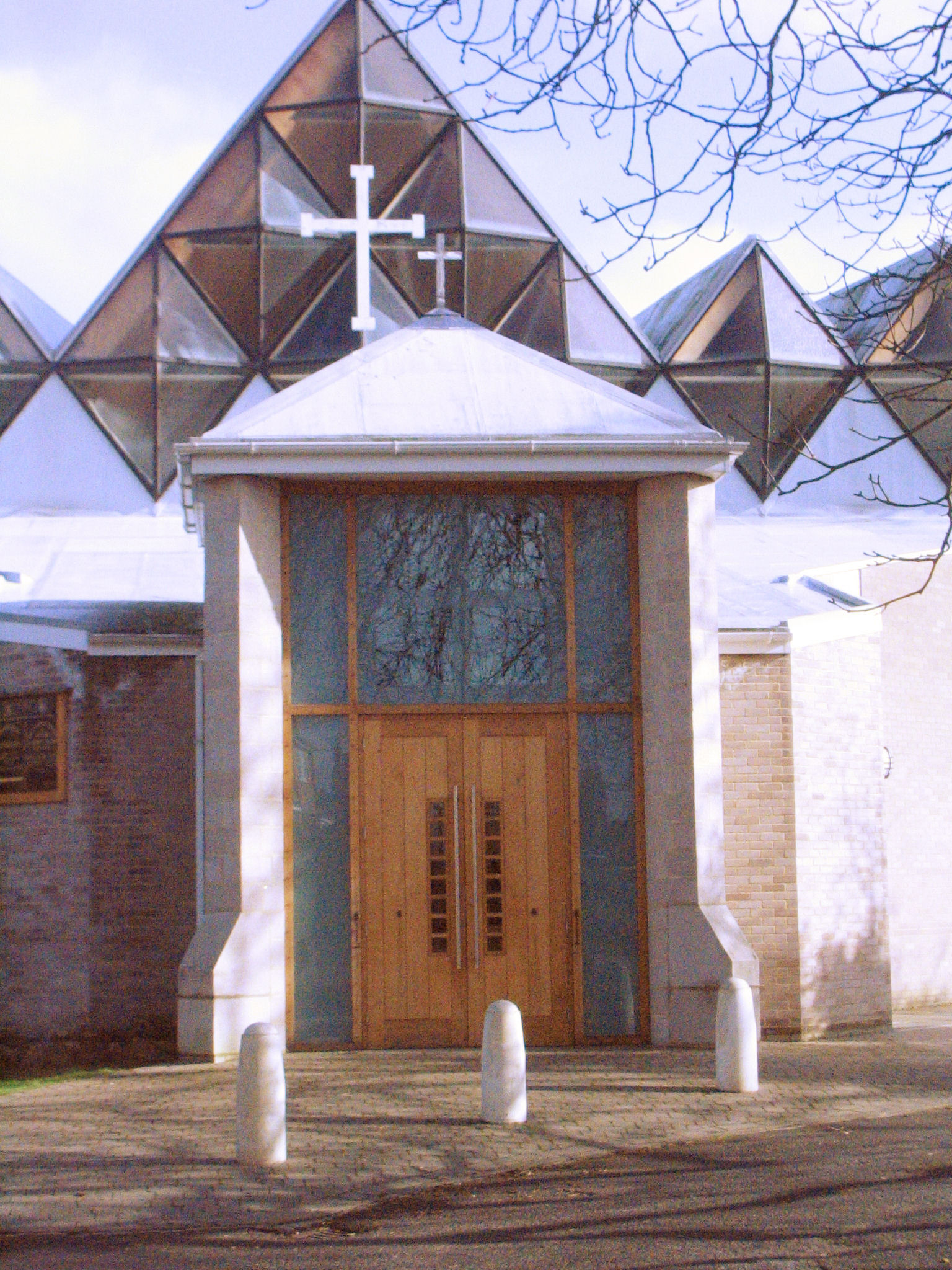
Roman Catholic church of Blessed Dominic Barberi

=== Roman Catholic ===
The Roman Catholic Church of Blessed Dominic Barberi was built in 1969.

== Littlemore Hospital ==
Littlemore Hospital was located on Sandford Road on the south west side of the village. After it closed, some of the rear blocks were acquired by Yamanouchi (now Astellas Pharma) for use as a research facility but then sold on, in 2008, to the SAE Institute for use as a training establishment. Meanwhile, the Littlemore Mental Health Centre, which includes the Ashurst Psychiatric Intensive Care Unit (PICU), has been established on the opposite side of the road.

== Railway ==
The Wycombe Railway opened Littlemore station in 1864 as part of its extension from Thame to Oxford. In 1963 British Railways withdrew passenger services between Princes Risborough and Oxford and closed all intermediate stations including Littlemore. The line through Littlemore remains open for freight traffic between the Didcot–Oxford main line at Kennington Junction and the BMW Mini factory at Cowley. A new passenger railway station has been proposed in the parish, which would serve Oxford Science Park.

== Notable residents ==
=== John Henry Newman ===
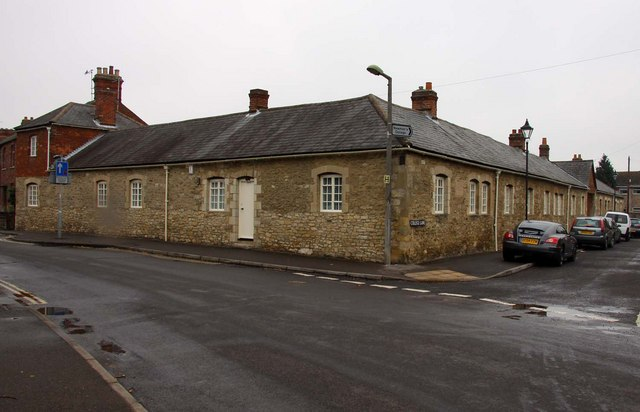
The college

Littlemore may be best known for the work of Cardinal Newman, whose connection with the village began in 1828, when he was appointed vicar of St Mary the Virgin and soon began holding classes for the residents of Littlemore. He organised a successful petition to have a new church built. From 1842 to 1846 Newman lived at Littlemore, in a house in College Lane, under quasi-monastic discipline. There, in 1845, he was received into the Roman Catholic Church (a sensation at the time) by Father Dominic Barberi, a prominent Passionist active in England at the time. The Birmingham Oratory bought the property in 1951, and members of an International Religious Order are residents and custodians of the college.

=== Other residents ===
The trade unionist Henry Broadhurst (1840–1911) was born in the village, the son of a local stonemason. The local historian Edmund Arnold Greening Lamborn lived at 34 Oxford Road, Littlemore from 1911 to 1950.

== See also ==
- Littlemore Brook

== Sources ==
- Lobel, Mary D, ed. (1957). "Littlemore". A History of the County of Oxford. Victoria County History. Vol. 5: Bullingdon Hundred. London: Oxford University Press for the Institute of Historical Research. pp. 206–214.
- Page, W.H., ed. (1907). "The priory of Littlemore". A History of the County of Oxford. Victoria County History. Vol. 2: Ecclesiastical History, etc. Westminster: Archibald Constable & Co. pp. 75–77.
- Pantin, W.A. (1970). "Minchery Farm". Oxoniensia. XXXV. Oxford: Oxford Architectural and Historical Society: 19–26. ISSN 0308-5562.
- Radford, David (2015). "Minchery Farm, Littlemore". Oxoniensia. LXXX. Oxford: Oxfordshire Architectural and Historical Society: 208. ISSN 0308-5562.
- Sherwood, Jennifer; Pevsner, Nikolaus (1974). Oxfordshire. The Buildings of England. Harmondsworth: Penguin Books. pp. 688–690. ISBN 0-14-071045-0.
