= Suppression of monasteries =

When monastic foundations were abolished

The suppression of monasteries refers to various events at different times and places in which monastic foundations were abolished and their possessions were appropriated by the state.

== Motivations ==
The monasteries, being landowners who never died and whose property was therefore never divided among inheritors (as happened to the land of neighboring secular land owners), tended to accumulate and keep considerable lands and properties, which aroused resentment and made them vulnerable to governments confiscating their properties at times of religious or political upheaval, whether to fund the state or to conduct land reform.

Monasteries are most likely to undergo such a fate when coming under a Protestant or secularist regime. However, Catholic monarchs and governments are also known to have taken such steps at some times and places. Similar confiscations also happened in Buddhist countries.

There are also known cases of specific monastic orders being suppressed by the Catholic Church itself, such as the suppression of the Jesuati by Pope Clement IX in 1668 or the (temporary) suppression of the Jesuits in 1759 (though the order was eventually restored, many of the properties confiscated from the Jesuits were not returned). Additionally, there were cases of specific monasteries at various times and places being disbanded as a result of power struggles within the Catholic Church. For example, the Cârța Monastery in Transylvania was disbanded in 1494 by the apostolic legate Ursus of Ursinis; the monastery at Igreja de São Cristóvão de Rio Mau in Portugal was dissolved in 1443 and its assets passed to the nearby Monastery of St. Simon of Junqueira.

It can be noted that the Dissolution of the Monasteries in England, a major act that marked King Henry VIII's break with the Catholic Church, had been preceded a few years by the smaller dissolution of some English monasteries and nunneries in the wake of the Littlemore Priory scandals, an earlier dissolution that had been carried on within the Catholic Church and specifically authorized by a papal bull.

== By place ==
=== America ===
==== California ====
After Mexico gained independence from Spain, in the 1830s there was a move to secularize the monastic Spanish missions in California, then part of Mexico. As with other such cases, the missions were considered to have gained too much land and power, and had been very dominant in the society of Spanish-ruled California.

==== Mexico ====
The Calles Law (Spanish: Ley Calles), or Law for Reforming the Penal Code was enacted in Mexico in 1926, under the presidency of Plutarco Elías Calles, with the proclaimed aim of enforcing the separation of church and state as set out in Article 130 of the Mexican Constitution of 1917. Among other acts against the Catholic Church, the Calles Law caused the outlawing of religious orders, depriving the Church of property rights and extensive closure of monasteries, convents, and religious schools.

=== Asia ===
==== China ====
In 845 the Chinese Emperor Wuzong of Tang suppressed thousands of Buddhist monasteries and confiscated their considerable properties. The Emperor's combined economic and religious motives for this act have many similarities to those of Western rulers taking a similar step towards Catholic or Orthodox Monasteries.

==== Mongolia ====
Like Buddhist and Christian monasteries elsewhere, the Mongolian monasteries have since the 16th century acquired riches and secular dependents, gradually increasing their wealth and power. By the beginning of the twentieth century, Outer Mongolia had 583 monasteries and temple complexes, which controlled an estimated 20 percent of the country's wealth. Following the Mongolian Revolution of 1921, authorities of the new Mongolian People's Republic entered into a prolonged struggle with the Buddhist faith in general and the monasteries in particular. In 1938 – amid accusations that the church and monasteries were trying to cooperate with the Japanese, who were promoting a pan-Mongol puppet state – this culminated with the remaining monasteries being dissolved, their property seized, and their monks secularized, interned or executed. Those monastic buildings that had not been destroyed were taken over to serve as local government offices or schools. Only the Gandan Monastery, with a community of 100 monks, was kept open in Ulaanbaatar as the country's sole monastery – more for international display than functionality. Following the Mongolian Revolution of 1990 some monasteries were re-opened.

=== Europe ===
==== Austria ====
The Edict on Idle Institutions was one of more than 10,000 ordinances issued by Joseph II, Holy Roman Emperor pertaining to religious issues. Promulgated in 1780, it outlawed contemplative monastic orders. The act permitted only monastic orders that dealt with teaching, nursing and other practical work within the Holy Roman Empire. The number of monks (whom the Emperor called "shaven-headed creatures whom the common people worship on bended knees") dropped from 65,000 to 27,000. The Holy Roman Empire also expropriated the monasteries and took their money to pay ordinary priests more. The edict fits in with Joseph's ecclesiastical reforms, in which he sought to control the church in Austria and the Empire and saw it as an arm of the state.

==== Belgium (Austrian Netherlands) ====
Emperor Joseph II's Edict on Idle Institutions was applied also in the Austrian Netherlands (present-day Belgium), reducing the number of monasteries there. A decade later, in the course of the French Revolution in 1794, French armies overran the same territory, and on October 1, 1795 it was annexed to the Republic (including territories that were never under Habsburg rule, like the Bishopric of Liège). The French Revolution's militant anticlerical policies, already implemented in France itself, were then applied to the new territory, which included the dissolution of convents and monasteries, the confiscation of ecclesiastical properties, and the separation of church and state.

==== Denmark ====
In Denmark in 1528, King Frederick I of Denmark confiscated 15 of the houses of the wealthiest monasteries and convents. Further laws under his successor over the course of the 1530s banned the friars and forced monks and nuns to transfer title to their houses to the Crown, which passed them out to supportive nobles, who soon acquired former monastic lands. Danish monastic life was to vanish in a way identical to that of Sweden.

However, most monks and nuns by far were allowed to stay in their monasteries and convents (except the Grey Friars). Only when the last monk or nun had died was the monastery added to the property of the Crown. Thus, except for fiercer procedures followed especially by bishop Peder Palladius on Zealand, the Reformation became a relatively bloodless affair in Denmark.

==== England, Ireland, and Wales ====
The Dissolution of the Monasteries was the administrative and legal process between 1536 and 1541 by which Henry VIII disbanded monasteries, priories, convents and friaries in England, Wales and Ireland; appropriated their income, disposed of their assets and provided for their former members. He was given the authority to do so in England and Wales by the Act of Supremacy, passed by Parliament in 1534, which made him Supreme Head of the Church in England, thus separating England from Papal authority, and by the Suppression of Religious Houses Act 1535 and the Second Suppression Act (1539).

Although some monastic foundations dated back to Anglo-Saxon England, the overwhelming majority of the 825 religious communities dissolved by Henry VIII owed their existence to the wave of monastic enthusiasm that had swept England and Wales in the 11th and 12th centuries. The 16th-century religious houses, therefore, controlled appointments to about a third of all parish benefices and disposed of about half of all ecclesiastical income. The dissolution remains the largest legally enforced transfer of property in English history since the Norman Conquest.

==== France ====
In an attempt to address the financial crisis, the Assembly declared, on 2 November 1789, that the property of the Church was "at the disposal of the nation." They used this property to back a new currency, the assignats. The nation had now thus also taken on the responsibility of the Church, which included paying the clergy, caring for the poor, the sick and the orphaned. In December, the Assembly began to sell the lands to the highest bidder to raise revenue, effectively decreasing the value of the assignats by 25 percent in two years. In autumn of 1789, legislation abolished monastic vows and on 13 February 1790 all religious orders were dissolved. Monks and nuns were encouraged to return to private life and a small percentage did eventually marry.

During the 19th century, some monasteries were reopened. For example, in the famous Grande Chartreuse, near Grenoble, the monks who were expelled in 1790 were allowed to return in 1838, after a long wait. However, following the establishment of the Association Law of 1901 and its interpretation that effectively banned religious associations en masse, many notable religious institutions across France, including Grand Chartreuse, were closed by the French government. According to the Catholic Encyclopedia, "the monastery, with a small portion of the surrounding pastures, was rented from the State until the last monks were expelled by two squadrons of dragoons on the 19th of April, 1903." While some monks found refuge in Italy until 1929, and "the monks of La Grand Chartreuse, driven into exile with the prior general, found refuge at Farneta, in Italy, until 1929, when Montrieux, the first of the French charterhouses to be restored, was reopened." others settled in the Tarragona region of Spain. In 1940, the Grande Chartreuse was reopened under Chief of State Philippe Pétain as a reward for the Holy See's endorsement of the Vichy regime. However, the monastery suffered from this association with the regime, which collaborated with Germany, and at the end of World War II, the Grand Chartreuse was used as a hospital by the Allies.

==== Italy ====
Bernardo Tanucci, who was the Prime Minister of the Kingdom of the Two Sicilies in the second half of the 18th century, was a most zealous regalist, seeking to establish the supremacy of a modernized State over the Catholic Church. Among other measures undertaken under the principles of enlightened absolutism, he closed convents and monasteries, distributing their lands among noble supporters of the Monarch, thus strengthening the royal presence in the Regno. Revenues of vacant bishoprics and abbeys went to the crown.

==== Germany and Austria ====
In 1521, Martin Luther published 'De votis monasticis' ('On the monastic vows'), a treatise which declared that the monastic life had no scriptural basis, was pointless and also actively immoral in that it was not compatible with the true spirit of Christianity. Luther also declared that monastic vows were meaningless and that no one should feel bound by them. Luther, a former Augustinian friar, found some comfort when these views had a dramatic effect: a special meeting of the German province of his order held the same year accepted them and voted that henceforth every member of the regular clergy should be free to renounce their vows, resign their offices and get married. At Luther's home monastery in Wittenberg all the friars, save one, did so.

After the Peace of Westphalia in 1648, the Protestant princes confiscated the estates of the monastic orders in their lands.

Under the influence of Josephinism the laicisation of several monastic foundations was undertaken in Catholic parts of Germany, Austria and Hungary.

The German mediatization, as the major territorial restructuring that took place between 1802 and 1814 in Germany and the surrounding region under the pressure of Napoleon Bonaparte's France, included a mass secularization of Catholic Church properties, prominently targeted monasteries as well as other Catholic Church properties. All of them had undergone secularization, "the transfer (of property) from ecclesiastical to civil possession or use." Altogether, hundreds of monasteries and other Catholic religious foundations were closed. It has been said that the Final Recess of 1803 did to German land ownership what the Revolution had done to France. Even where the monasteries and abbeys were not closed down altogether, their lands had been taken away and so they had lost their means of subsistence.

The page list of Christian monasteries in Germany enumerates the monasteries that have either survived or been dissolved.

==== Netherlands ====
After 1572, with the success of the Dutch Revolt and consolidation of the Dutch Republic, the Calvinist Church became the sole officially recognized church in its entire territory. All properties of the Catholic Church were confiscated and all monasteries dissolved with the sole exception of Maastricht and its immediate environs, where a special exception was made in 1632. The former monastic premises were put to a variety of public and private uses. For example, the Great Abbey of Middelburg became the meeting hall of the States of Zealand and the St Agnes Convent in Rotterdam became the Prinsenhof, headquarters of the Admiralty of Rotterdam. Elsewhere, former monasteries were often made available as housing and workshops to the numerous Protestant refugees (estimated at between 100,000 and 150,000) who escaped or were expelled from the South Netherlands, which were overrun by the Spanish army and where the Catholic Church was triumphant. In particular, former monasteries were used as workshops for Protestant weavers displaced from such towns as Bruges and Ghent who re-established themselves in various cities of the Dutch Republic.

==== Portugal ====
After the Portuguese Civil War, a 28 May 1834 decree from Joaquim António de Aguiar nationalised the land of over 500 monasteries.

==== Romania ====
The law on the secularization of monastery estates in Romania was proposed in December 1863 by Domnitor Alexandru Ioan Cuza and approved by the Parliament of Romania. By its terms, the Romanian state confiscated the large estates owned by the Eastern Orthodox Church in Romania.

==== Russia ====
In 1917 the Bolsheviks confiscated, without compensation, the estates of the churches and the monasteries.

==== Scotland ====
Henry VIII's Dissolution of the Monasteries did not affect Scotland, which was still a completely separate kingdom. In the Scottish Reformation of the 1560s, monasteries in Scotland were not dissolved but were allowed to die out with their monks. The Reformation's focus on the parish church as the centre of worship meant the abandonment of much of the complex religious provision of monasteries, as of chapelries and cathedrals, many of which were allowed to decay or, like the Cathedral at St. Andrews, were mined for dressed stone to be used in local houses. Dunfermline Abbey, one of the most well-known monasteries is Scotland, was sacked in March 1560 and largely ruined, but parts were later rebuilt, with its church made into a parish church.

The Cistercian Abbey of Dulce Cor, better known as Sweetheart Abbey, persisted longer than other Scottish monasteries. Starting in 1565, the Scottish crown placed the abbey under a series of commendatory abbots. The last Cistercian abbot was Gilbert Broun, S.O.Cist. (died 1612), who continued to uphold the Catholic faith long after the Reformation. He was charged several times with enticing to "papistrie" from 1578 to 1605 until he was finally arrested in 1605, in spite of the resistance of the whole countryside, and transported to Edinburgh, where he was tried and sentenced to exile. In 1624, the last of the monks died and the abbey buildings and land passed into the hands of Sir Robert Spottiswoode, son of the Archbishop of St Andrews, who assumed the title of Lord of New Abbey.

==== Spain ====
Between 1835 and 1837, a series of decrees from Juan Álvarez Mendizábal were published, which confiscated, without compensation, monastic land estates.

==== Sweden ====
In the Riksdag of Västerås in 1527, King Gustavus Vasa secured an edict of the Diet allowing him to confiscate any monastic lands he deemed necessary to increase royal revenues, and to allow the return of donated properties to the descendants of those who had donated them, should they wish to retract them. By the following Reduction of Gustav I of Sweden, Gustav gained large estates, as well as loyal supporters among the nobility who chose to use the permission to retract donations done by their families to the convents.

The Swedish monasteries and convents were simultaneously deprived of their livelihoods. They were banned from accepting new novices or preventing their existing members from leaving if they wished to do so. However, the former monks and nuns were allowed to reside in the convent buildings for life on state allowance, and many of them consequently survived the Reformation for decades. The last of them was Vreta Abbey, where the last nuns died in 1582, and Vadstena Abbey, from where the last nuns emigrated in 1605, about half a century after the introduction of the Reformation.

==== Switzerland ====
In Switzerland, too, monasteries came under threat. In 1523, the government of the city-state of Zurich pressured nuns to leave their monasteries and marry and followed the next year by dissolving all monasteries in its territory under the pretext of using their revenues to fund education and to help the poor. The city of Basel followed suit in 1529, and Geneva adopted the same policy in 1530. An attempt was also made in 1530 to dissolve the famous Abbey of St. Gall, which was a state of the Holy Roman Empire in its own right, but it failed, and St. Gall survived for another two-and-a-half centuries.

In 1798, under the impact of the French Revolution and German Mediatisation, St. Gall Abbey was finally secularized, the Prince-Abbot's secular power was suppressed, and the monks were driven out and moved into other abbeys. However, the Catholic Church managed to retain control of the abbey church and a portion of the monastic buildings, which eventually became a separate Episcopal see in 1846.

== Further suppressions ==
There were other suppressions in existing and formerly Catholic countries, including the following:

- The laicisation of church land by the French monarchy
- The confiscation of monastic property in Napoleonic and post-unification Italy
- The German Mediatisation in the Napoleonic period
