= Edmund Arnold Greening Lamborn =

Edmund Arnold Greening Lamborn (1877–1950) was a British educationalist and local historian of Oxfordshire.

== Early life and education ==
Edmund was born at 43 Cowley Road, Oxford on 19 November 1877 and baptised by Father Benson at St John's Church, Cowley, on 21 December that year. He was the son of Arnold Edwin Lamborn (a decorator's son who was born in St Pancras, London but was living at 43 Cowley Road at the time of his marriage) and his second wife Susannah Greening (born in Temple Cowley, Oxfordshire and the daughter of a farmer). His parents were married at St James's Church in Cowley village on 30 April 1872.

At the time of the 1881 census, when Edmund was three years old, he was living at 43 Cowley Road with his parents and his younger sister Elspeth. His father, who had described himself as an auctioneer at his wedding, now stated that he was a carrier's goods agent. The family was then moderately prosperous and had a 14-year-old general servant, but this changed after Edmund's father, Arnold Edwin Lamborn, died in Berkshire in 1888. In 1891 Edmund (13) was still at school and living at Radley Road, Abingdon (which was then in Berkshire) with his widowed mother and sister: his mother's occupation was given as “Letting Lodgings”, but there was only one elderly boarder on census night, and they no longer kept a servant. Edmund's formal education came to an end in 1892 when, at the age of 14, he started work as a pupil teacher. He continued to educate himself as well as his young pupils, stating in the book Who’s Who in Oxfordshire, published in 1936, that he was “educated by Books, Buildings and the Companionship of Wild Animals”.

== Career ==
In 1901 Edmund, now a 23-year-old assistant master at St Mary Magdalen Boys’ School at Gloucester Green, was boarding at a lodging house at 20 Gloucester Street, Oxford.

In 1909, he was appointed headmaster of East Oxford Boys’ School in Collins Street, Oxford, a post he held until 1944.

His mother had died back in 1904, and around the beginning of 1911 he and his sister Elspeth, who was a district nurse, moved to 34 Oxford Road, Littlemore, where they both remained for the rest of their respective lives. The house now has a blue plaque in his memory.

Greening Lamborn, as he was usually known, became an important local historian and a self-trained archaeologist, and in 1912 his book The Story of Architecture in Oxford Stone was published at the Clarendon Press.

In 1921 he was awarded an Honorary M.A. by the University of Oxford.

In 1929 he edited a book for schools entitled Present-Day Prose (Sidgwick & Jackson, 1929). He also wrote articles for various magazines for teachers on school walks, nature study, history, architecture, poetry, arithmetic, and drawing, and his book Expression in Speech and Writing, which was an account of experiments made at East Oxford School, was published in 1921 by Oxford University Press. He also served as a lecturer in English at the War Office Training School for Officers and as an Assistant Master of Method at the Oxford University Day Training College. He gave as one of his recreations “the Education of Education Officials”, and also served occasionally as a school inspector himself. From 1927 to 1935 he was an Examiner in English Poetics for the University of London Diploma (together with Professor Lascelles Abercrombie in 1928, Professor F. S. Boas in 1935, and Professor Oliver Elton in 1935).

== Death and legacy ==
Edmund Arnold Greening Lamborn died at 34 Oxford Road, Littlemore on 24 August 1950.

After his death his sister Elspeth Mary Lamborn (1836–1888) fulfilled his wish to set up the Greening Lamborn Trust, whose aim is “the promotion of the study of local history of Oxfordshire”.

== Publications ==
In 1936, Greening Lamborn chose the following from his many publications on education, architecture, and local history to appear in his entry for Who's Who in Oxfordshire:

- A History of Berkshire (1908)
- Stories from the History of Berkshire (1909)
- A Perspective of History (1910)
- Architecture in Oxford Stone (1912)
- The Rudiments of Criticism (1916)
- Selections from Longfellow (1917)
- The Teaching of Literature (in the Modern Teacher, 1920)
- Expression in Speech and Writing
- (with G. B. Harrison) Shakespeare, the Man and his Stage
- (with T. H. Hughes) Towns and Town Planning (1923)
- Articles on Ecclesiastical Architecture and Military Architecture in Barnard's Medieval England (1924)
- Poetic Values: A Guide to the Appreciation of the Golden Treasury
- Present Day Prose
- Oxford: A Short Historical Guide (1928)
- The English Parish Church, its Architecture and Antiquities (1929)
- Reason in Arithmetic (1930)
- Architecture, in Handbook to the University of Oxford (1932)
- History of Headington Quarry and Shotover (1933)
- Introduction to Wells's Charm of Oxford (1934)
- The Wells' Shrine of St. Edburg (1935)
- The Churches of Bix (1936)
