= Murton Grange =

Coordinates: 54.2847°N 1.1790°W

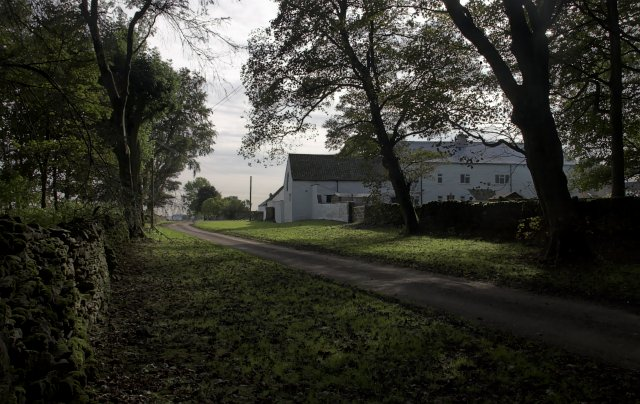

- Location within North Yorkshire
- Civil parish: Hawnby
- Unitary authority: North Yorkshire
- Ceremonial county: North Yorkshire
- Region: Yorkshire and the Humber
- Country: England
- Sovereign state: United Kingdom
- Police: North Yorkshire
- Fire: North Yorkshire
- Ambulance: Yorkshire

Murton Grange or Murton or Morton is a hamlet in the civil parish of Hawnby, in North Yorkshire, England. It is about 23 miles (37 km) miles from York.

== History ==
The name "Murton" means 'Moor farm/settlement', both parts are Old English. Murton was recorded in the Domesday Book as Mortun. The manor was granted to Byland in the 12th century, the majority of the original manor buildings are probably under the current farm house and barns. Morton was formerly an extra-parochial tract, in 1858 it became a civil parish. In 1894 Murton became part of the Helmsley Rural District of the North Riding of Yorkshire, on 1 April 1974 the parish was renamed from "Murton" to "Murton Grange" and became part of Ryedale non-metropolitan district in the non-metropolitan county of North Yorkshire, on 1 April 1986 the parish was abolished and merged with Hawnby. At the 1971 census (one of the last before the abolition of the parish), Murton had a population of 16. In 2023 it became part of North Yorkshire district.
