= Igreja de São Cristóvão de Rio Mau =

Coordinates: 41°23′59″N 8°40′46″W

Igreja de São Cristóvão de Rio Mau is a church in Vila do Conde, Portugal. It is classified as a National Monument.

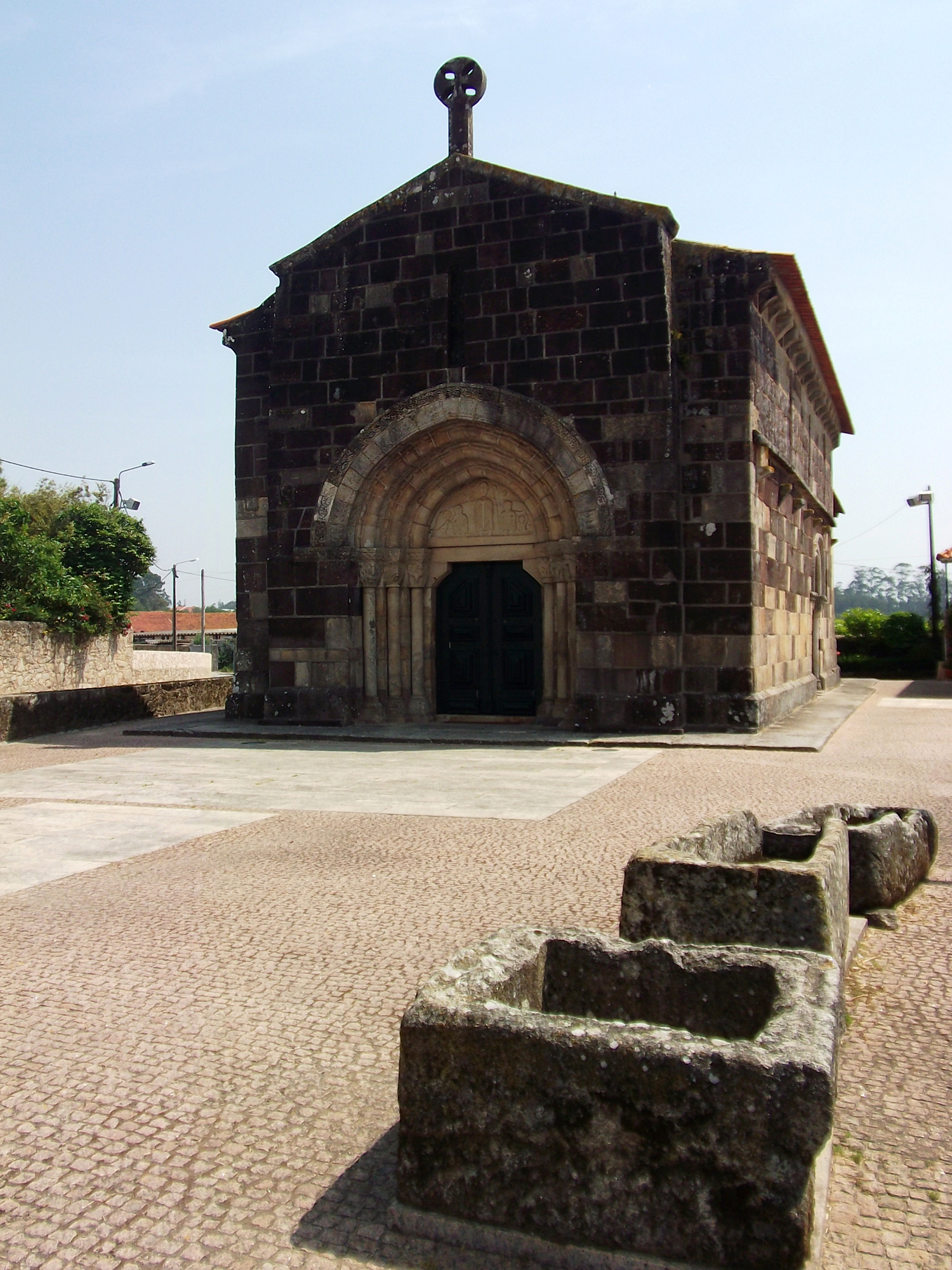
Rio Mau Romanesque Church

== History ==
This is a monastery church with a simple Romanesque construction, consisting of a nave with a timber roof and a rectangular apse. It is dedicated to St. Christopher. This small church is all that remains from an ancient monastery, founded in the 11th century, and belonging to the Canons Regular of St. Augustine. The earliest reference to this monastery dates from 1103.

The present church is the result of a rebuilding carried out from 1151, as indicated by an inscription on the apse. This reconstruction in Romanesque style, was performed in several stages under different artistic influences. The apse was built first and reveals the strong influence of contemporary Galician art. The capitals on the columns are performed masterfully, representing, among others, medieval poet-musicians playing instruments.

The current nave and the most western parts of the church were built during late twelfth century and early thirteenth century. The portals show the Romanesque influence of the Portuguese Benedictines, typical of Northern Portugal. The tympanum of the north portal shows a dragon and a griffin, a likely representation of the struggle between Jesus and the devil. The tympanum of the main portal is more elaborate. In the center stands a bishop in a blessing attitude (probably St. Augustine), flanked by two young deacons and two small figures, a bird with a sun and a mermaid holding a moon, symbols also associated with St. Augustine.

In 1443 the monastery was dissolved and its assets passed to the Monastery of St. Simon of Junqueira, located close-by. This possibly contributed to the survival of the Romanesque church although the convent buildings were demolished.

In the twentieth century the church underwent restorations and has become a National Monument since 1910.

== See also ==
- List of churches in Portugal
- National Monuments of Portugal
