= All Saints' Church, Hawnby =

Church in Hawnby, North Yorkshire, England

Coordinates: 54°18′00″N 1°10′37″W

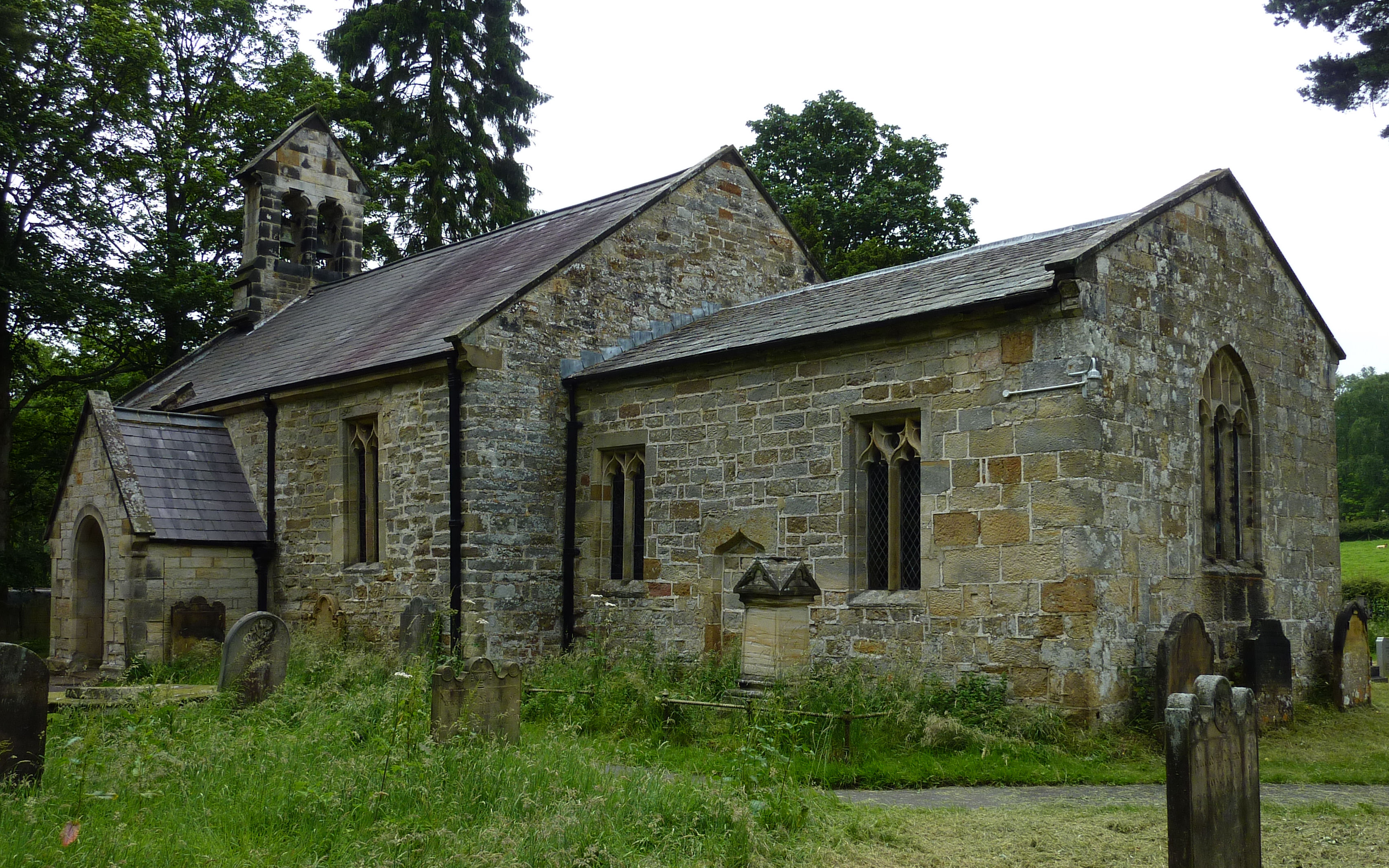
The church in 2012

All Saints' Church is the parish church of Hawnby, a village in North Yorkshire, in England.

The church was originally built in the 12th century, but was largely rebuilt in the early 15th century, only the tower and south wall of the nave being retained. In 1873, the church was restored by William Henry Crossland, his first known restoration. He also added a porch and replaced the south doorway. The church was Grade II* listed in 1955.

The church is built of sandstone and limestone, and has roofs of Welsh and Westmorland slate. It consists of a three-bay nave with a south porch, and a two-bay chancel. On the west gable is a bellcote. Most of the windows have two lights with trefoils above, while the east window has three lights and is Perpendicular Gothic in style. Inside, there is a small remnant of what may have been the Norman tower arch, including a capital with a carving of a human head. There is an octagonal font, which is old but has been recut, and several monuments from the 17th century on.

The church is part of the parish of Upper Ryedale. It maintains a particular interest in making poetry available to churchgoers and visitors.

== See also ==
- Grade II* listed churches in North Yorkshire (district)
- Listed buildings in Hawnby
