= Arden Priory =

Monastery in Hawnby, England (1150–1536)

Coordinates: 54°18′30″N 1°12′11″W

Arden Priory was a priory near to Hawnby in the former Ryedale district of North Yorkshire, England. A Benedictine nunnery has been recorded here since 1150. At the time of its dissolution in 1536, it had 6 nuns, one prioress, and an elderly sister, aided by sixteen servants.
