= Arden Hall =

House in Hawnby, North Yorkshire, England

Coordinates: 54°18′30.960″N 1°12′10.836″W

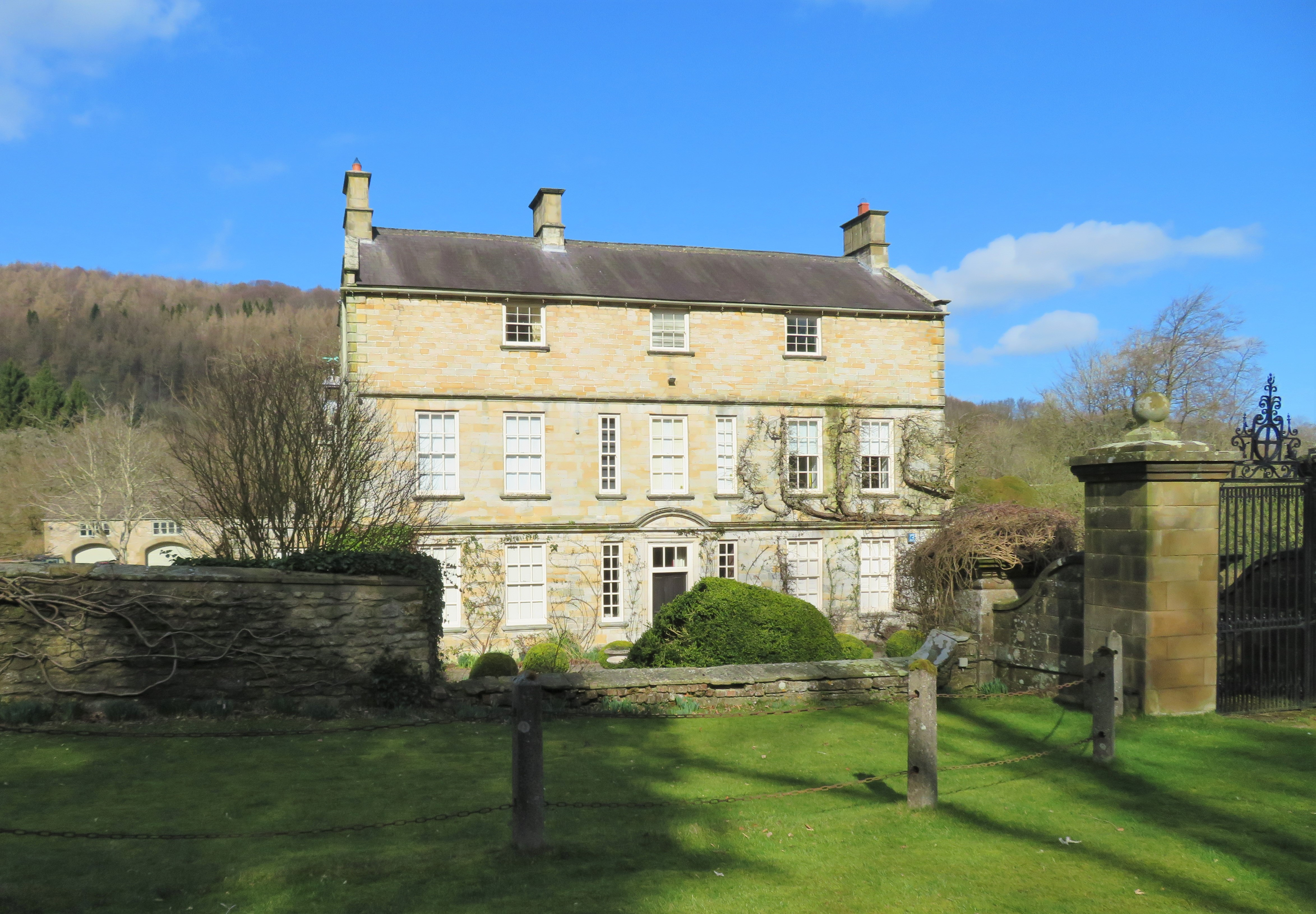
The building, in 2021

Arden Hall is a historic building near Hawnby, a village in North Yorkshire, in England.

The house was built in the 1680s on the site of St Andrew's Priory, although it may contain remnants of an earlier building. The south wing was added in the 1700s by the Tancred family, and the house was further extended in the 19th century. In the early 20th century, the northeast wing was added, and the original section was extended. Near the end of the 19th century, it was purchased by the Earl of Mexborough as a second home. In 1958, their main home, Methley Hall, was demolished, and some of its fixtures were moved to Arden Hall. The house was grade II* listed in 1955.

The house is built of sandstone, with projecting quoins, floor bands, and roofs of stone slate, Welsh slate and Westmorland slate, with gable coping and shaped kneelers. It has three storeys, the top storey a later addition, a front range of seven bays, and rear cross-wings. The central doorway has a divided fanlight in a moulded architrave and a segmental pediment. The windows are sashes, those in the lower two floors with lintels and keystones.

Inside, there is an entrance hall with a grand three-flight staircase. The southeast ground floor room has mid 18th-century panelling from Methley Hall, while the southwest room has reset 17th-century panelling including a frieze, and an early-18th century door. The office has a large 17th-century fireplace, while the dining room has a particularly impressive chimneypiece of about 1700, from Methley. The first floor landing has early 18th-century fittings and a cornice from late in the century. The central room has reset 17th-century panelling and an early 18th-century cornice. The southeast room has mid-18th century panelling and a marble chimneypiece from Methley, while the southwest room has reset early-17th century panelling.

== See also ==
- Grade II* listed buildings in North Yorkshire (district)
- Listed buildings in Hawnby
