= Hawnby =

Village and civil parish in North Yorkshire, England

Coordinates: 54°18′04″N 1°10′02″W

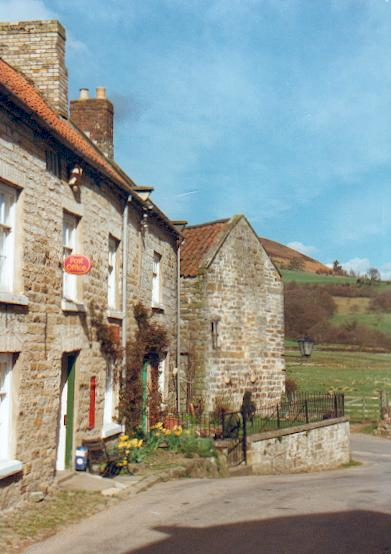
- Hawnby, Ryedale

- Location within North Yorkshire
- Population: 217 (2011)
- OS grid reference: SE543898
- Civil parish: Hawnby
- Unitary authority: North Yorkshire
- Ceremonial county: North Yorkshire
- Region: Yorkshire and the Humber
- Country: England
- Sovereign state: United Kingdom
- Post town: YORK
- Postcode district: YO62
- Police: North Yorkshire
- Fire: North Yorkshire
- Ambulance: Yorkshire
- UK Parliament: Thirsk and Malton

Hawnby is a crossroads village and civil parish in the North York Moors National Park, North Yorkshire, England. The village is about 7 miles (11 km) north-west of Helmsley. The parish includes the hamlet of Murton Grange.

== History ==
The name Hawnby probably derives from the Old Norse Halmibȳ meaning 'Halmi's village'. The first element could perhaps be derived from the Old English halm meaning 'straw'.

The village is mentioned twice in the Domesday Book as Halmebi in the Allerton hundred. It was part of the Thornton-le-Moor manor and records local landowners to be Fredegaest and Ulf. After the Norman invasion, the lands passed to the King and were granted to Robert Malet.

Hawnby became the first village in England to have all of the buildings switch from normal lights to dark-skies friendly lighting in an effort to cut light pollution. Both the North York Moors and Yorkshire Dales National Parks were awarded dark-sky status in 2020.

== Governance ==
The village is in the Thirsk and Malton UK Parliament constituency. It is in the Kirkbymoorside electoral division of North Yorkshire Council. From 1974 to 2023 it was part of the district of Ryedale.

== Geography ==
The village sits at the junction of several small roads at the head of two valleys, close to the B1257 road between Oswaldkirk and Stokesley. The nearest settlements are Boltby 3.7 miles (6 km) to the south-west; Old Byland 2.3 miles (3.7 km) to the south and Fangdale Beck 3.4 miles (5.5 km) to the north. It lies between Ladwith Beck and the River Rye at an elevation of around 500 feet (150 m) above sea level.

The 1851 UK Census recorded the population as 326, which had decreased to 231 at the time of the 1881 UK Census. The 2001 UK Census records the population as 223, of which all of the 127 aged over sixteen years were in employment. There were 94 dwellings, of which 65 were detached. The 2011 Census showed a reduced population of 217.

== Religion ==
All Saints' Church is an Anglican church, built in the 12th century and a Grade II* listed Building. It stands on the banks of the River Rye. There is also a Wesleyan Chapel, founded in 1770 following a visit from John Wesley, which was rebuilt in 1814. It is a Grade II Listed Building.

== Notable buildings ==
Arden Hall just to the west of the village is a Grade II Listed Building and is the seat of the Earls of Mexborough. Previously it had been the seat of the Tancred family for at least 300 years. Mary, Queen of Scots stayed here briefly en route to her execution.

In addition to Arden Hall and the two churches, there are 33 other Listed Buildings in and around the area, including Arden Mill, Church Bridge and Laskill Bridge.

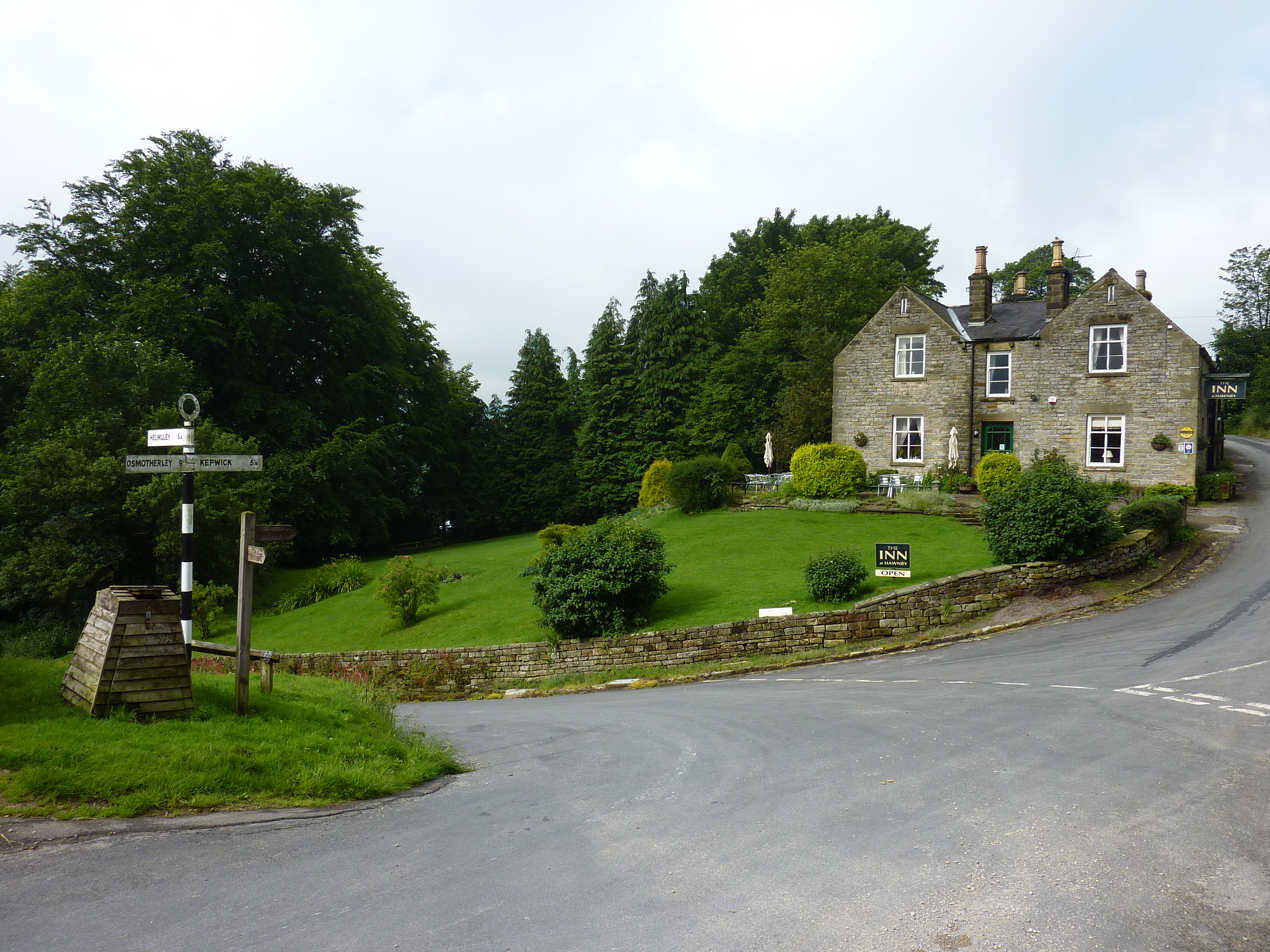
The Inn at Hawnby

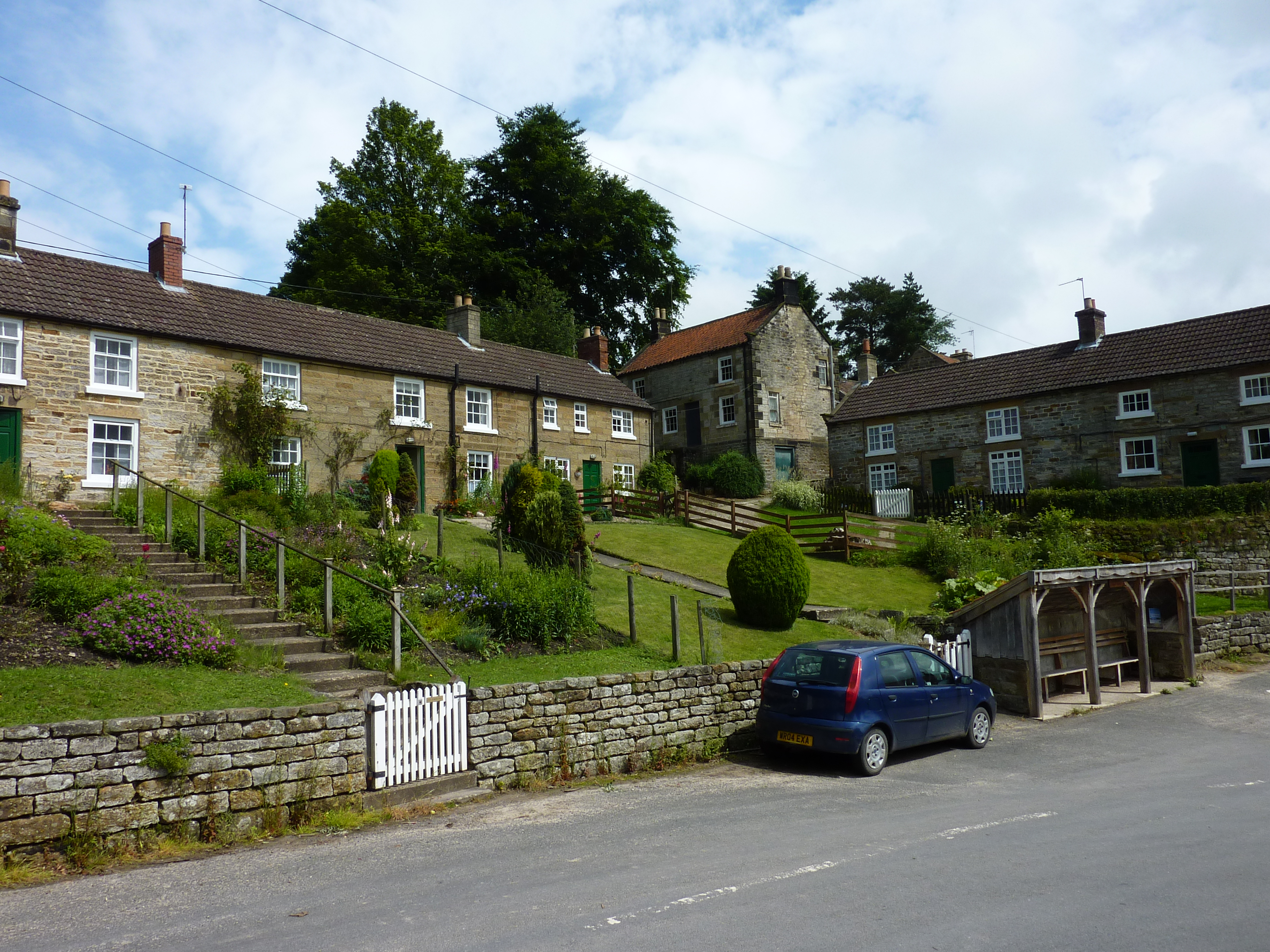
Cottages in the upper part of the village in Hawnby

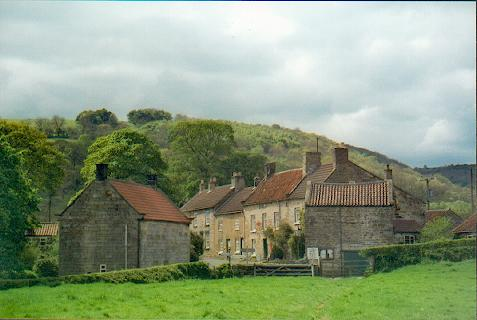
The lower part of Hawnby village in May 2003

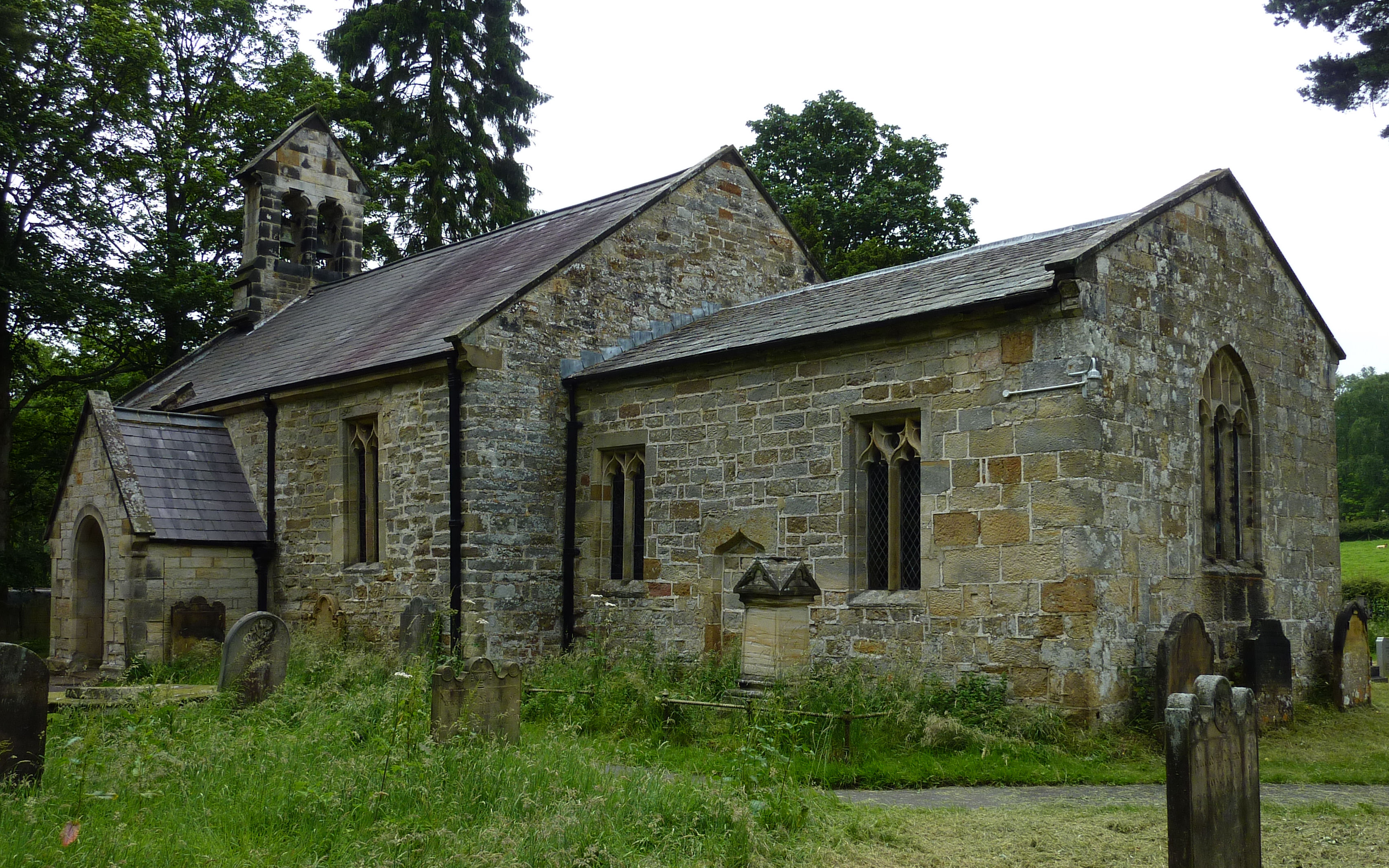
All Saints Church, Hawnby, Yorks.

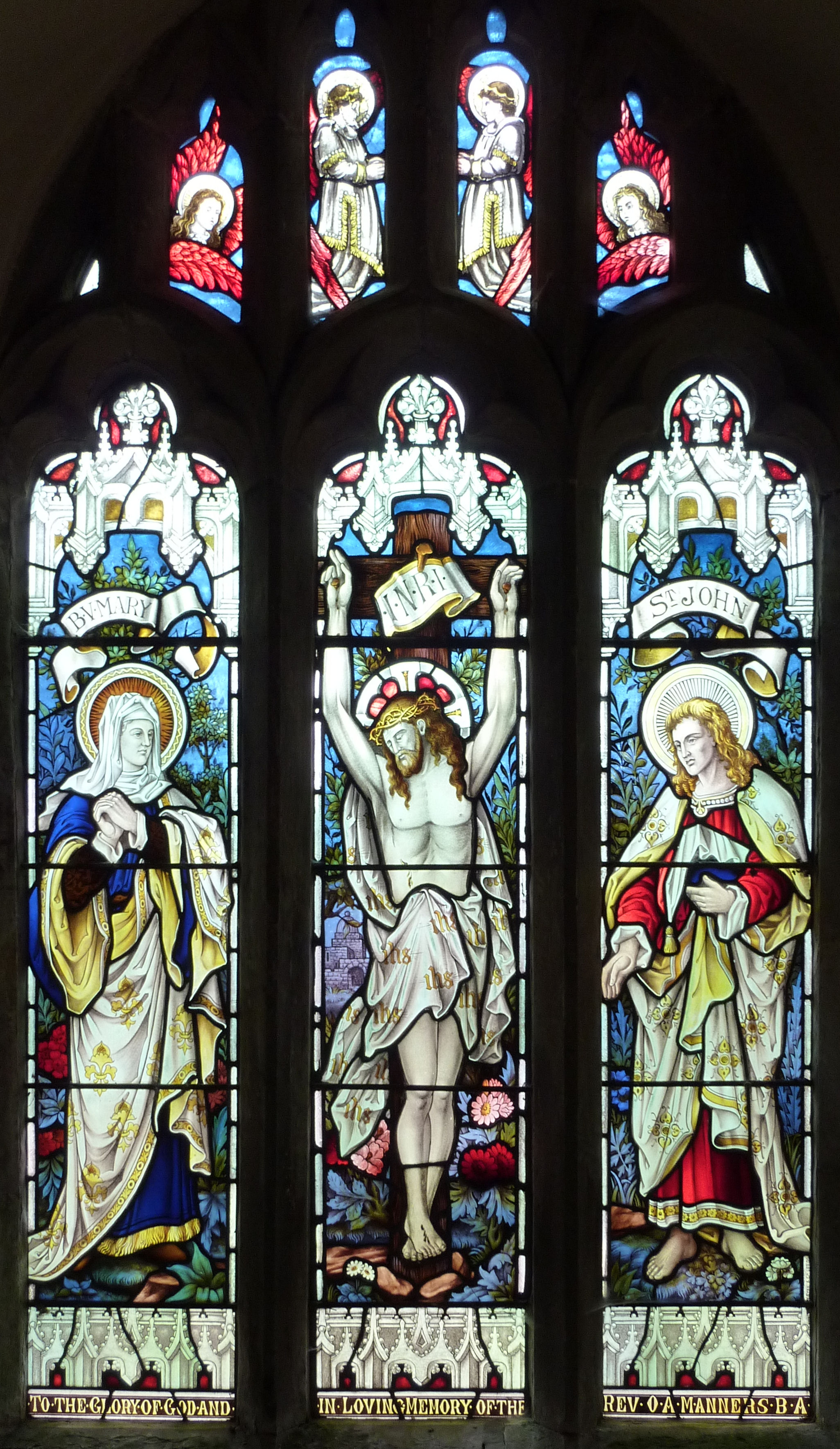
Stained Glass in All Saints Church, Hawnby

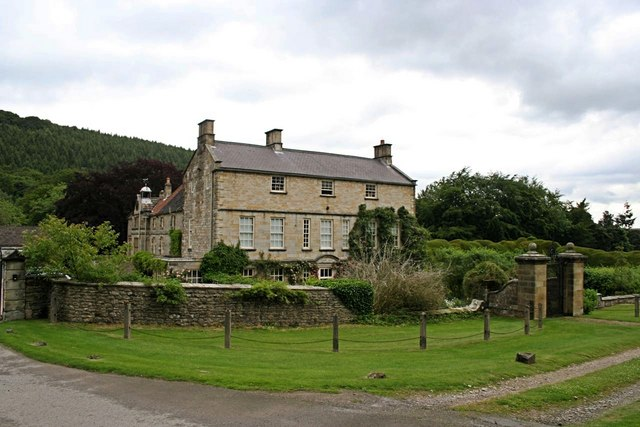
Arden Hall, Near Hawnby
